= Reichskommissariat Niederlande =

Territory of Nazi Germany from 1940 to 1945

Reich Commissariat for the Occupied Dutch Territories Reichskommissariat für die besetzten niederländischen Gebiete (German)
- 1940–1945
- Flag Emblem
- Anthem: Horst-Wessel-Lied ("The Horst Wessel Song")
- Reichskommissariat Niederlande in 1942
- Capital: Amsterdam^{a}
- Common languages: Dutch; German
- Government: Civil administration
- Reichskommissar
  - 1940–1945: Arthur Seyss-Inquart
- Leader of the Dutch People
  - 1942–1945: Anton Mussert
- Historical era: World War II
  - Seyss-Inquart appointed: 29 May 1940
  - German capitulation in Netherlands: 5 May 1945

Area
  - Total: 42,000 km^{2} (16,000 sq mi)

Population
  - 1940: 8,834,000
- Currency: Dutch guilder (NLG)
Preceded by	Succeeded by
Netherlands	Netherlands
- Today part of: Netherlands
- 1. As in pre-war and post-war Netherlands, The Hague was the actual seat of government.

The Reichskommissariat Niederlande, formally the Reich Commissariat for the Occupied Dutch Territories (German: Reichskommissariat für die besetzten niederländischen Gebiete), was the civilian occupation regime set up by Germany in the German-occupied Netherlands during World War II. The administration was headed by Arthur Seyss-Inquart, formerly the last chancellor of Austria before initiating its annexation by Germany.

== Introduction ==
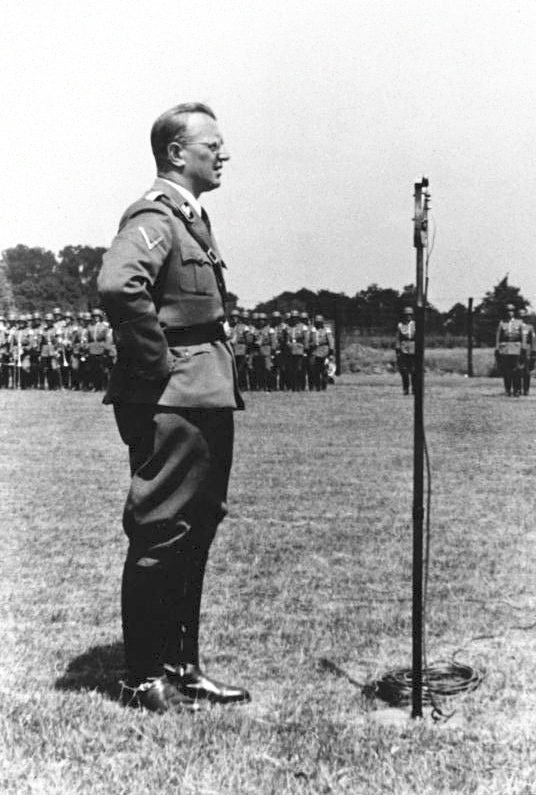
Arthur Seyss-Inquart in The Hague

The German domination of the Netherlands began with the German invasion. On the day of the capitulation (15 May 1940), the entire ministerial staff fled to London to form a Dutch government in exile. Queen Wilhelmina had already preceded them the previous day. This had de facto left government authority in the hands of general Henri Winkelman as the senior-most military commander in the Netherlands. On 20 May 1940 a military administration was initially implemented, led by Militärsbefehlshaber Alexander Freiherr von Falkenhausen. This was quickly disbanded however to be replaced by a civil administration under the authority of the newly appointed Arthur Seyss-Inquart, who was named Reichskommissar für die besetzten niederländischen Gebiete. The new form of government was therefore not a German military government (Militärverwaltung) but a civil government (Zivilverwaltung). Hitler chose this option on mainly ideological grounds: the Dutch were considered a "racially related kindred-people" and therefore had to be won over for National Socialism.

This move was technically justified on legal grounds according to the provisions of the Hague Conventions on the laws of war. The wholly unconstitutional evacuation of the monarch and her government before the advancing German forces meant that there was no longer any functioning civil authority left in the area. Article 43 of The Laws and Customs of War on Land stipulates that in this scenario, the occupying power is accorded responsibility for maintaining order in the territories that it has occupied in lieu of the native government exercising this authority.

On the longer term ("longer term" not being defined any further by the Germans other than "nach Kriegsende", meaning after the war's conclusion), the German authorities anticipated the direct integration of the Netherlands into the expanding Third Reich.

Since abdicating the Imperial throne in 1918, former German Kaiser Wilhelm II had been living in the Netherlands. Since the invasion, Wehrmacht soldiers guarded his house. Wilhelm hoped he could persuade Hitler or the Berlin government to restore the German monarchy. All requests were denied. Wilhelm died in the Netherlands on June 4, 1941. Despite Hitler's personal animosity toward Wilhelm, whom among many he blamed for Germany's defeat in World War I, he wanted to bring Wilhelm's body back to Berlin for a state funeral, as Wilhelm was a symbol of Germany and Germans during the previous World War. Hitler felt that such a funeral would demonstrate to the Germans the direct descent of the Third Reich from the old German Empire. However, Wilhelm's wishes never to return to Germany until the restoration of the monarchy were respected, and the German occupation authorities granted him a small military funeral, with a few hundred people present. The mourners included August von Mackensen, fully dressed in his old imperial Life Hussars uniform, Admiral Wilhelm Canaris, and Reichskommissar Arthur Seyss-Inquart, along with a few other military advisers. However, Wilhelm's request that the swastika and other Nazi regalia be not displayed at his funeral was ignored, and they are featured in the photographs of the event taken by a Dutch photographer.

Wilhelm was buried in a mausoleum in the grounds of Huis Doorn, which has since become a place of pilgrimage for German monarchists.

=== The National Socialist Movement in the Netherlands pre-occupation ===
The Nationaal Socialistische Beweging, or in English the National Socialist Movement (NSB), had existed for years before the Germans arrived in the Low Countries. Between World War I and World War II, Dutch society experienced a crisis in its sociopolitical system. The National Socialist movement offered a solution to Netherlands' instability and gained some influence without endangering the existing political order, a system that was already frail during the period of political democracy. However, this form of democracy was not completely in practice nor uncontested as a principle by the NSB.

Leading up to the German invasion, the National Socialist Movement spent much of the 1930s loudly denouncing the government's inability to protect the Dutch people from economic suffering, social chaos, and the expanding influence of Marxism-Bolshevism. The group separated itself as an internal force, gaining a small degree of importance during that mid-1930s, and eventually contributing to the German efforts to Nazify the occupied Netherlands. The NSB began to admire the "achievements" of the German Reich by 1936 and broadcast their own warnings that "International Jewry" had taken a hold of the Netherlands and would conquer Europe.

As the Germans gained power in the Netherlands, the NSB believed it could influence occupation policy and German behavior. The group anticipated Anton Mussert, a prominent and founding member of the Party, to be Hitler's appointee during the occupational regime.

If the German invasion had never occurred, it is undisputed that the NSB would never have managed to take over political power of the Netherlands. The Germans did not allow for an independent Dutch way to National Socialism and only wanted to incorporate Dutch Nazis into the political structure as supporters and executors of German policy, not leaders of the country in its entirety.

== Structure ==
The German government in the Netherlands was headed by Seyss-Inquart as Reichskommissar. Beneath him were four Generalkommissare. These were:

- Hans Fischböck, Generalkommissar für Finanz und Wirtschaft (finance and economics);
- Hanns Albin Rauter, Generalkommissar für das Sicherheitswesen (security) who also maintained the position of Higher SS and Police Leader;
- Fritz Schmidt, Generalkommissar zur Besonderen Verwendung ('special tasks'). Succeeded by Willi Ritterbusch after the former's suicide on 26 June 1943;
- Friedrich Wimmer, Generalkommissar für Verwaltung und Justiz (administration and justice).

The Wehrmacht troops stationed in the Netherlands were commanded by Wehrmachtbefehlshaber in den Niederlanden Friedrich Christiansen (28 May 1940 - 7 April 1945).

There was a constant conflict between Seyss-Inquart, Hitler's personally appointed Reich Commissioner who relied directly on Hitler's support, and Rauter, who was the Generalkommissar for security matters and nominally subordinate to Seyss-Inquart, but as Higher SS and Police Leader he took direct orders from Heinrich Himmler. In the period following the February Strike, Seyss-Inquart and Rauter engaged in a political struggle as each competed for control over Jewish affairs in the country. The control which Seyss-Inquart was supposed to have was almost non-existent in practice due to overlapping and contradictory competences and a series of unresolved conflicts between party and state organizations, as well as the individuals listed above.

Despite his nominal government subordination to Seyss-Inquart, Rauter as an SS officer was actually only responsible to Heinrich Himmler as Reichsführer-SS. His own deputies in turn were the Befehlshaber der Sicherheitspolizei und des SD (commander of the criminal police and the SD) Wilhelm Harster, the Aussenstelle (deputy) in Amsterdam (headed by Willy Lages), and the Zentralstelle für jüdische Auswanderung (Central Office for Jewish "Emigration") led by Ferdinand aus der Fünten.

No new ministers were appointed; the secretaries-general maintained control over their respective departments, but were now operating under the authority of Seyss-Inquart. The existing lower-level governments remained completely intact as well, although these were gradually being replaced by NSB members as the war progressed.

== Strategy and policy ==
Upon the German occupation of the Netherlands in 1940, Nazi Germany's attitude towards the Dutch people initially seemed favourable. Adolf Hitler, Heinrich Himmler, and other senior Nazis regarded the Dutch as part of the Aryan "Herrenvolk" (Master Race).

Seyss-Inquart's policy was to gradually prepare the state structure and Dutch population for National Socialist ideology, the notion of creating a "new Europe" (meaning one led by Germany), and ultimately assimilation into Greater Germany after its victory in the war. However, he was aware of the limited support that the Netherlands' future as a German province would necessarily receive, and adjusted his style of rule accordingly so as not to cause any unwanted unrest among the Dutch people. He was also aware that the local Fascist and Nazi movements in the Netherlands, particularly the Nationaal-Socialistische Beweging (NSB) led by Anton Mussert were nothing more than minority groups generally despised by the vast majority of the Dutch. Mussert was also an advocate of the creation of Dietsland, a kind of Greater Netherlands to be formed out of the Dutch-speaking Netherlands and Flanders, rather than a Greater Germanic one as desired by Adolf Hitler. For these reasons Seyss-Inquart allowed the NSB only limited authority, and was generally unwilling to appoint its members to strategically significant positions.

In the early stages of the German occupation, the Nazis planned to support the NSB's rival National Socialist Dutch Workers Party (NSNAP), which openly called for the annexation of the Netherlands into Nazi Germany. The party received extensive coverage in Nazi newspapers and the organization was expanded with the establishment of the Dutch Hitlerjugend. However, the NSNAP was a fringe party, having received less than 0.03% of the vote in the 1937 Dutch general election, compared to the NSB's more than 4%, and was ultimately deemed to be politically useless by the Germans.

Mussert tried to convince Hitler that he should be the leader of an independent Dutch state, a request which Hitler denied, leaving Reichskommissar Seyss-Inquart as the absolute ruler of the Netherlands. However, he was allowed to take on the title of "Leader of the Dutch People" and the NSB was permitted to continue its political activities. The NSB declared that the monarchy was abolished and that the Netherlands should support Germany in the war. 20,000 to 25,000 Dutchmen served in the German army and Waffen-SS.

All institutions and organizations deemed unacceptable by Nazi Germany were abolished. These measures were opposed especially by Dutch Roman Catholics and socialists.

Despite being considered Herrenvolk, Germany's requirements for war production resulted in the introduction of forced labour (Arbeitseinsatz) for Dutch men between the ages of 18 and 45, as well as the extraction of Dutch natural resources for the use in Germany's war machine.

=== Annexation plans ===
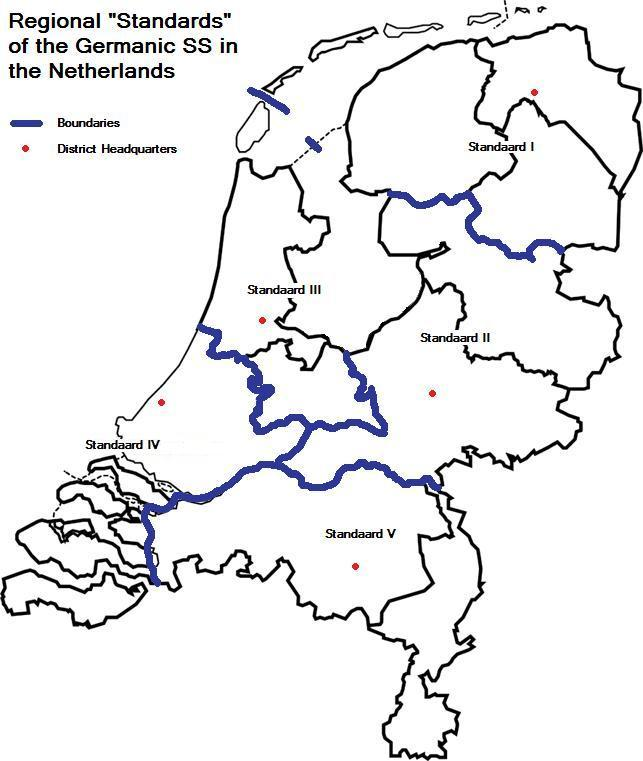
Regional Standards of the Dutch SS

After its invasion, the Netherlands was temporarily placed under the authority of a German civilian governor (a Reichskommissar) until a final decision would be made on the next form of government to "facilitate" the Dutch nation for its intended assimilation into Germany. However, on several occasions, the German regime seriously considered implementing a concrete plan to change the territorial composition of Reichskommissariat Niederlande. Its then-eleven provinces were to be replaced by five new gewesten (historical Dutch term for a sub-national state polity) and Reichskommissar Seyss-Inquart appointed as Reichsstatthalter und Gauleiter for the entire country as the first step in this process.

This proposal originated from a document created by Hanns Albin Rauter, the Higher SS and Police Leader in the Netherlands, who subsequently submitted it to Nazi Party Secretary Martin Bormann in November 1942. In it he put forward his suggestions on the future political organization of the Netherlands when it would be a component of the Third Reich. It called for its effective division into five new Reichsgaue, preferably to be led by Dutch Waffen-SS veterans from the eastern front. These Gaue were entirely coterminous with the five police and judicial districts that the Germans had established earlier, based on the regional "standards" of the Dutch SS. Fearing the resulting further Nazification of the Netherlands the key Dutch government officials strongly advised Seyss-Inquart not to carry out these steps on account of the administrative chaos that it would inevitably cause, causing them to be shelved for the time being. When Germany was subsequently forced on the defensive after 1942, they were abandoned indefinitely.

=== February strike ===
In February 1941, opposition to the anti-Semitic policies of the German occupiers and the collaborationists caused major strikes to break out across the Netherlands. This started after the NSB and its stormtroopers, the Weerbaarheidsafdeling (Defence Section) or WA began a series of provocations against Jewish neighbourhoods in Amsterdam. Fighting broke out in which members of the WA were injured, the collaborationists then called in the support of the German Army which assisted in turning the neighbourhood into a ghetto surrounded by barbed wire and armed positions, non-Jews were not allowed to enter the area. Days later German Ordnungspolizei entered the neighbourhood but a number of police were injured, the Germans then responded by raiding the neighbourhood and capturing 425 Jews who were then deported to concentration camps. On the 24th, the Communist Party of the Netherlands (made illegal by the Nazis) called for the people of Amsterdam to go on strike. Afterwards, tram drivers, schools, and some companies joined the strike. After three days, German police put down the strike.

== Collaboration in the administration ==
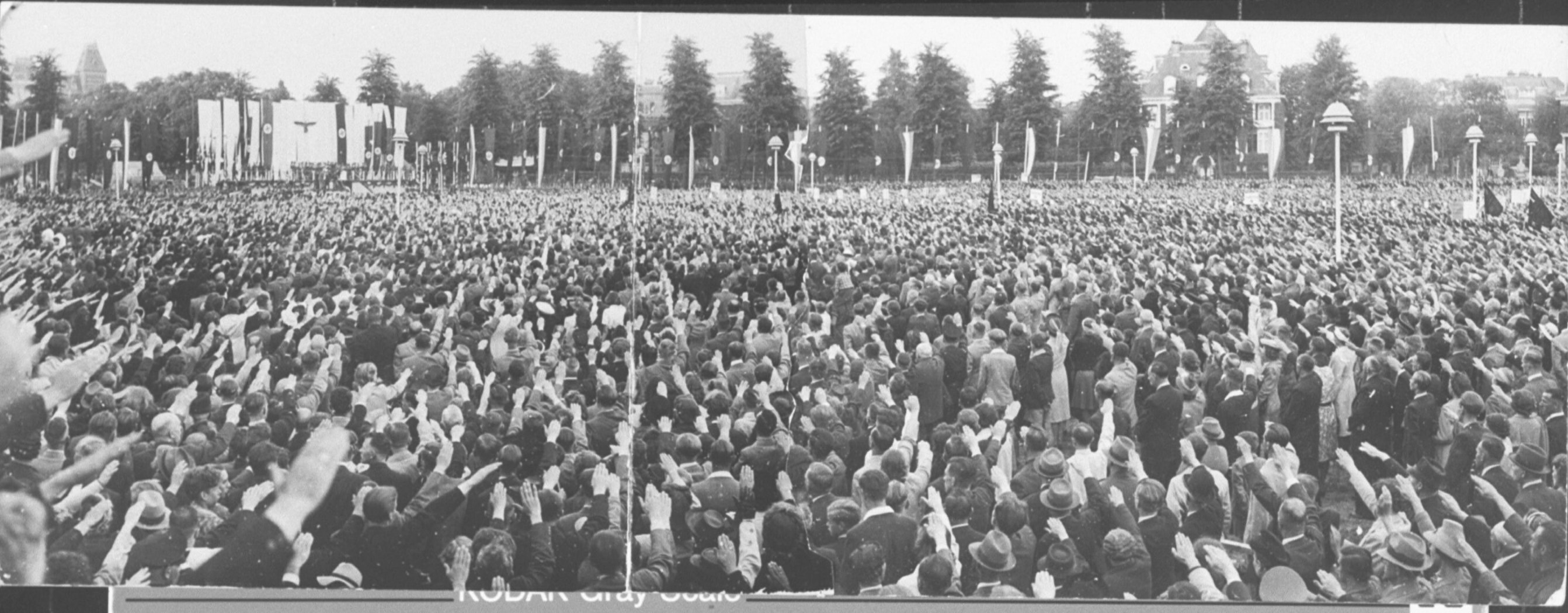
An NSB rally in Amsterdam, 27 June 1941

As German authorities took hold of the Netherlands, they hoped to find substantial groups among the Dutch who were prepared to accept National Socialism and collaboration. Accommodation was the first phase of the occupation and was characterized by a readiness by the majority of the Dutch population to accept political consequences of their defeat. Dutch elites indicated a willingness to reach some understanding with the Germans, either playing an active role in some way in the persecution and deportation of the Jews or failing to put up any kind of resistance at all, this is particularly true of the Dutch administrative assistants and the authorities as a whole. The Dutch civil service, also, in general, adopted an accommodating attitude to the Germans.

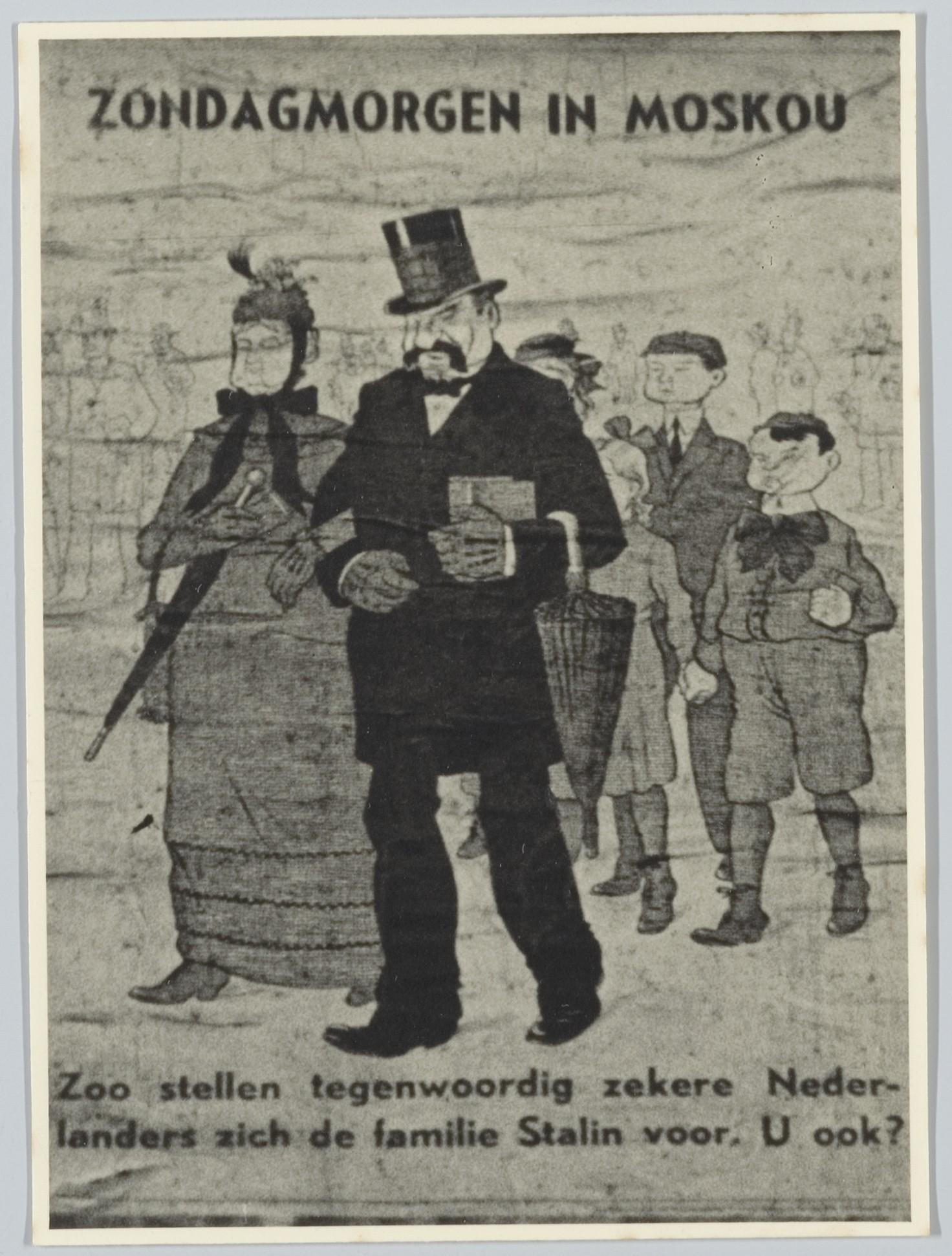
Collaborationist propaganda, 1944

In 1937, special Aanwijzingen (instructions) were formulated for the Dutch government employees and other public servants on cooperating with occupying forces. Public servants were to stay on the job and carry out their duties to the best of their ability, so those who remained at their post had to judge for themselves whether the contents of each order they were given were substantively and procedurally legitimate. Under these rules the traditional Dutch civil service were, therefore, expected to be loyal to the principles of administrative and public order above all other considerations.

Prime Minister Gerbrandy, exiled to London along with members of his cabinet and the royal family, announced in his speech, Commentaar op de Aanwijzingen (Comments on the Instructions), the guidelines of how public servants were expected to behave, stating that they were not to cooperate with the occupying force in any way, especially in the Nazi persecution of the Jews.

Although the Germans did appoint a number of NSB members and other Germanophiles to senior posts like secretaries-general and mayors, their numbers or ideological influence on the administration was not extensive. Dr. Friedrich Wimmer led the internal government and had the power to issue mandatory regulations to Dutch civil servants and under his rule local government was transformed into an instrument by which policy was used to Nazify the Netherlands. The civilian administration in the Netherlands enabled the Germans to exert much tighter control over Dutch citizens than military occupied countries like the French government in Vichy.

The nature of the civilian, rather than a military, administration was a major contributing factor to the ease that Nazi-sponsored policies against the Jews were carried out. A general absence of any Wehrmacht control over the running of the country allowed civilians and the agencies operated by Himmler's SS more freedom. In January 1941, civil servants, administrators, and elected representatives were ordered by the Germans to register the whole Dutch population by name and address, Jews were to be registered separately. These extensive and detailed population registers made it easy for the Germans to target Jews, eventually allowing for the process of registration to be replaced by segregation, spoliation, and eventually deportation.

However, the bureaucracy in the Netherlands was not a model of efficiency, the SS/SD personnel were no more ruthless or efficient than elsewhere in Europe, but there were a greater number of German police, around 5,000, compared to that of France where it never went above 3,000. The dominance of the SS in the Netherlands has been cited as one of the fundamental differences between the Netherlands and other Western European occupied by the Germans.

== Liberation ==
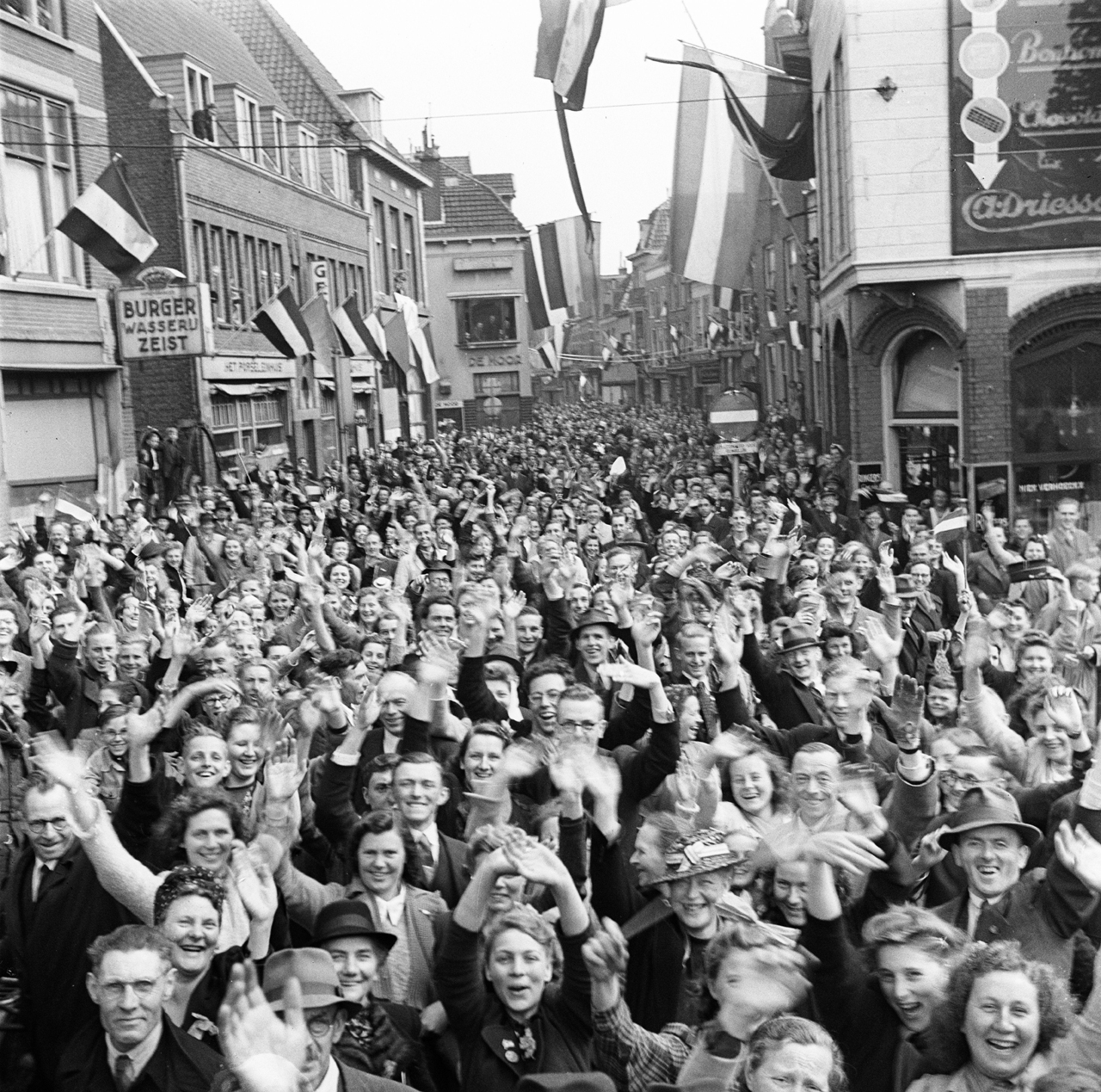
People celebrating the liberation of Amersfoort on 7 May 1945

From 1944 to 1945, the Reichskommissariat came under attack from Allied forces. The first attempt to liberate the Netherlands by the Allies was during Operation Market Garden in 1944, involving the use of paratrooper divisions to take over key bridges in the Netherlands to allow Allied tanks positioned in Belgium to quickly go through the Netherlands and reach Arnhem, which held a bridge over the river Rhine. This would put the Allies in a strategic advantage to invade Germany and quickly end the war. Eindhoven and Nijmegen were liberated. However Allied intelligence failures and poor organization resulted in an Allied failure to cross the Rhine at Arnhem.

After Market Garden, the Canadian Army was given the initiative to liberate the Netherlands, the Canadian armed forces managed to push the German forces to the upper part of the Netherlands by 1945 in which Germany surrendered, abdicating its claim to the Netherlands and all other occupied territories.

== See also ==
- History of the Netherlands (1939–1945)
- National Socialist Movement in the Netherlands
- Nederlandsche SS

== Sources ==
- Gerhard Hirschfeld. Nazi Rule and Dutch Collaboration. The Netherlands under German Occupation, 1940-1945. Berg Publishers, London 1988.
- (in Dutch) L. de Jong (1969–1991). Het Koninkrijk der Nederlanden in de Tweede Wereldoorlog. Staatsuitgeverij, The Hague.
