= Johanna Wanka =

German politician

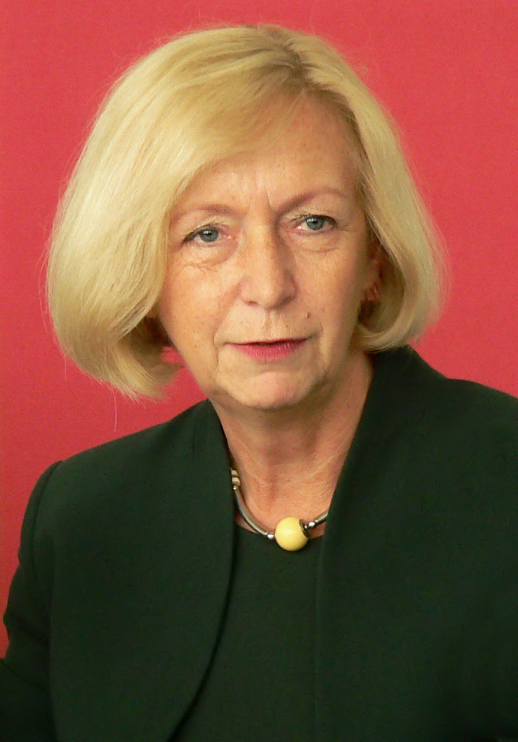

Federal Minister of Education and Research
- In office 14 February 2013 – 14 March 2018
- Chancellor: Angela Merkel
- Preceded by: Annette Schavan
- Succeeded by: Anja Karliczek

Minister of Science and Culture of Lower Saxony
- In office 27 April 2010 – 13 February 2013
- Prime Minister: David McAllister
- Preceded by: Lutz Stratmann
- Succeeded by: Gabriele Heinen-Kljajić

Leader of the Christian Democratic Union in Brandenburg
- In office 29 October 2008 – 27 April 2010
- Preceded by: Ulrich Junghanns
- Succeeded by: Saskia Ludwig

Deputy Minister President of Brandenburg
- In office 4 November 2008 – 4 November 2009
- Prime Minister: Matthias Platzeck
- Preceded by: Ulrich Junghanns
- Succeeded by: Helmuth Markov

Minister of Science, Research and Culture of Brandenburg
- In office 17 October 2000 – 4 November 2009
- Prime Minister: Matthias Platzeck
- Preceded by: Wolfgang Hackel
- Succeeded by: Sabine Kunst

Member of the Landtag of Brandenburg
- In office 19 September 2004 – 27 April 2010

Personal details
- Born: 1 April 1951 (age 75) Rosenfeld, East Germany
- Party: Christian Democratic Union
- Spouse: Gert Wanka
- Children: 2
- Education: Leipzig University

Johanna Wanka (née Müller; born 1 April 1951) is a German politician of the Christian Democratic Union (CDU) who served as federal minister for education and research in the government of Chancellor Angela Merkel from 2013 until 2018. From 2000 to 2009, she served as minister for science, research and culture of the state of Brandenburg, then from 2010 to 2013 she served as minister of science and culture of the state of Lower Saxony, in the Cabinet McAllister.

== Early life and education ==
Wanka was born on 1 April 1951. She attended the Polytechnic Secondary School in Großtreben and the advanced school in Torgau before studying mathematics at Leipzig University in the GDR. From 1974 on, she was a research assistant at Merseburg University of Applied Sciences, where she received her doctorate in 1980. In 1993 she became professor of engineering mathematics at Merseburg University of Applied Sciences. In March 1994, she was elected rector of that university, a position she retained until taking office as minister in October 2000.

== Political career ==
Wanka joined the East German citizens' movement in early 1989. She was a founding member of the Neues Forum in Merseburg and was a member of the Kreistag Merseburg from 1990 until 1994.

Wanka joined the CDU in 2001, the CDU executive in Brandenburg in May 2003, and became chair of the Dahme-Spreewald district in December 2003. She was appointed deputy national chair of the CDU Brandenburg in January 2007, acting national chair in October 2008, and national chair by January 2009.

From 2000 to 2009 Wanka was the state minister for science, research and cultural affairs of Brandenburg, first in the government of Minister-President Manfred Stolpe (2000–2002) and later under his successor Matthias Platzeck (2002–2009). As such she was president of the Kultusministerkonferenz, an association of all state ministers for this area, in 2005.

From 2010 to 2013 Wanka served as state minister of science and culture of the state of Lower Saxony, in the Cabinet McAllister; she became the first East German to become a minister in a state government in the former West Germany. She was also a CDU delegate to the Federal Convention for the purpose of electing the president of Germany in 2010.

In February 2013, Wanka succeeded Annette Schavan as federal minister of education and research in the government of Chancellor Angela Merkel. During the negotiations to form a coalition government following the 2013 federal elections, she led the CDU/CSU delegation in the working group on education and research; her co-chair from the SPD was Doris Ahnen.

== Other activities ==
- Einstein Foundation Berlin, Member of the Advisory Board (since 2020)
- Berlin-Brandenburg Institute for Franco-German Cooperation in Europe, member of the board of trustees
- Braunschweigische Stiftung, member of the advisory board
- Deutsche Telekom Foundation, member of the board of trustees
- Deutscher Zukunftspreis, ex officio member of the board of trustees (2013–2018)
- German Forum for Crime Prevention (DFK), ex officio member of the board of trustees
- Ernst Reuter Foundation for Advanced Study, vice-chair of the board of trustees
- Helmholtz Association of German Research Centres, ex officio member of the senate (2013–2018)
- Konrad Adenauer Foundation, member
- Max Planck Institute for Mathematics in the Sciences, member of the board of trustees
- Total E-Quality initiative, member of the board of trustees
- Volkswagen Foundation, member of the board of trustees (2012–2016)

== Political positions ==
During Wanka's term as president of the Kultusministerkonferenz, the controversial German orthography reform was put into place. After continued discussion in July 2005 about the reform which was to be put into force by August 2005, Wanka pushed the state ministers to go ahead without delays. However, few months after her term as president had ended, she was quoted by the influential German journal Der Spiegel as follows: "The ministers of Culture have long known that the spelling reform was wrong. For reasons of state, it has not been withdrawn."

== Selected publications ==
- Lösung von Kontakt- und Steuerproblemen mit potentialtheoretischen Mitteln (Solution of contact and steering problems with potential-theoretical methods). Dissertation A (first dissertation) submitted to the Faculty of Technical Science and Mathematics at the Technische Hochschule Leuna, Merseburg, 1980.
- Johanna Wanka (Ed.): Meeting of young scientists at the Fachhochschule Merseburg. Applied Science Conference. Aachen: Shaker, 2001, 216 S., ISBN 3-8265-8356-6.
- Foreword by Johanna Wanka in – Elke Schieber (eds): The archive of the director Frank Beyer. Filmmuseum Potsdam. Potsdam, Berlin: Filmmuseum Potsdam and Cultural Foundation of the Länder, 2004, p. 88.

== Personal life ==
Wanka is married to mathematics professor Gert Wanka with whom she has two children.

Political offices
Preceded by Annette Schavan	Minister of Education and Research; 2013–2018	Succeeded by Anja Karliczek
