= Hans Heinrich Schaeder =

German Iranologist

- Born: 31 January 1896; Göttingen, German Empire
- Died: 13 March 1957 (aged 61); Göttingen, West Germany

Academic background
- Education: University of Kiel
- Academic advisors: Werner Jaeger; Fritz Kern; Carl Heinrich Becker; Josef Markwart

Academic work
- Discipline: Classical philology; Iranian studies; Oriental studies
- Institutions: University of Breslau; University of Königsberg; Humboldt University of Berlin; University of Leipzig; University of Göttingen
- Notable students: Annemarie Schimmel; Carsten Colpe
- Main interests: Manichaeism

Heinz Heinrich Schaeder (31 January 1896 – 13 March 1957) was a German Orientalist and Iranologist.

== Life ==
Heinz Heinrich Schaeder was born in Göttingen, Germany on 31 January 1896. He was the son of theologist Erich Schaeder, brother of historian Hildegard Schaeder and cousin of theologian Günter Lüling. Raised in a strict fashion by his father, Schaeder studied classical philology at the University of Kiel since 1914. During World War I, he served in the German Army. He continued his studies in classical philology at Kiel under Werner Jaeger. Under the influence of historian Fritz Kern, Lommel developed an interest in the Middle East. Completing "all his academic degrees in an incredibly short time", Schaeder gained his Ph.D. at Kiel in 1919 with a thesis on the Islamic theologian Hasan al-Basri. He completed his habilitation in 1922 with a thesis on the Persian poet Hafez.

In the 1920s, German Iranian studies was dominated by Friedrich Carl Andreas and Christian Bartholomae, but Schaeder belonged to neither of those schools. Instead, he gained his introduction to the subject through Carl Heinrich Becker and Josef Markwart. From 1922 to 1926, Schaeder was a professor at the University of Breslau. Schaeder considered these years the most productive of his career. He "acquired an amazing knowledge" of Semitic, Iranian and Turkic languages, and of philosophy, religious science and general linguistics. Several works of importance were written at this time.

From 1926 to 1931, Schaeder was a professor at the University of Königsberg. He was also briefly a professor at the University of Leipzig during this time. Upon the death of Markwart in 1930, Schaeder was appointed Chair of Iranian and Armenian Philology at the University of Berlin. He occupied this position from 1931 to 1944. Schaeder sympathized with Nazism, but was always respectful towards his Jewish colleagues.[?]

Since 1944, Schaeder served as Chair of Oriental Philology and Religious History at the University of Göttingen. Throughout his career, Schaeder published more than 260 scholarly books and articles. His most important contributions were to the study of Manichaeism. As a professor he was known for his powerful oratory and high demands on his students. Annemarie Schimmel and Carsten Colpe were among his students. Schaeder died in Göttingen on 13 March 1957.

== Selected works ==
- “Hasan von Basra Ein Beitrag zur Geschichte des frühen Islam,” Ph.D. diss., Universität Breslau, 1919.
- “Hafizstudien,” Habilitation for Oriental Philology, Universität Breslau, 1922.
- “Die islamische Lehre vom Vollkommenen Menschen, ihre Herkunft und ihre dichterische Gestaltung,” ZDMG 79, 1925, pp. 192–268.
- “Iranische Lehren,” in R. Reitzenstein, H. H. Schaeder, eds., Studien zum antiken Synkretismus aus Iran und Griechenland, II, Leipzig and Berlin, 1926, pp. 199–305.
- “Urform und Fortbildungen des mannichäischen Systems,” in F. Saxl, ed., Vorträge der Bibliothek Warburg 1924–1925, Leipzig and Berlin, 1927, pp. 65–157; repr. in Colpe, 1968, pp. 15–107.
- Esra der Schreiber, Tübingen, 1930.
- “Zandik – Zindiq,” Iranische Beitrtäge I, Schriften der Königsberger Gelehrten Gesellschaft 6.5, Halle, 1930, pp. 274–91.
- “Über die Inschrift des Ariaramnes,” SPAW, Phil.-hist. Kl., XXIII, Berlin, 1931, pp. 635–45 .
- Review of H. Lommel, Die Religion Zarathustras nach dem Awesta dargestellt, Deutsche Literaturzeitung 3/45, 1932, coll. 2121-37 .
- “Bardesanes von Edessa in der griechischen und der syrischen Kirche,” Zeitschrift für Kirchengeschichte 3, Folge II, 51, 1932a, pp. 1–74; repr . in Colpe 1968, pp. 109–16.
- “Gott und Mensch in der Verkündigung Zarathustras,” Corolla, Ludwig Curtius zum 60. Geburtstag dargebracht, Stuttgart, 1934, pp. 187–200.
- “Über einige altpersische Inschriften,” SPAW, Phil.-hist. Kl. XIX, Berlin, 1935, pp. 489–506.
- “Ein parthischer Titel im Sogdischen,” BSOS 8, 1935a, pp. 737–49.
- “Manichäismus und spätantike Religion,” Zeitschrift für Missionskunde und Religionswissenschaft 50/3, 1935b, pp. 65–85.
- “Der Manichäismus nach neuen Funden und Forschungen,” in F. G. Taeschner, ed., Orientalische Stimmen zum Erlösungsgedanken, Series Morgenland 28, Leipzig, 1936, pp. 80–109.
- “Beiträge zur iranischen Sprachgeschichte,” Ungarische Jahrbücher 15, 1935 [1936], 1936a, pp. 560–88.
- “Lebensansicht und lyrische Form bei Hafis,” in Goethes Erlebnis des Ostens, Leipzig, 1938, pp. 105–22.
- “Zarathustras Botschaft von der Rechten Ordnung,” Corona 9, 1940, pp. 575–602; repr. in B. Schlerath, ed., Zarathustra, Darmstadt, 1970, pp. 97–117.
- “Der iranische Zeitgott und sein Mythos,” ZDMG 95, NF 20, 1941, pp. 268–99.
- “Läßt sich die ‘seelische Entwicklung des Dichters Hafis’ ermitteln?,” Orientalische Literaturzeitung, 1942, coll. 201-10.
- “Des eigenen Todes sterben,” Nachrichten der Akademie der Wissenschaften in Göttingen, Phil.-hist. Kl. 1946/47, pp. 24–36.
- “Der Manichäismus und sein Weg nach Osten,” Glaube und Geschichte Festschrift für Friedrich Gogarten, 1948, pp. 236–54.
- Goethe als Mitmensch, Göttingen, 1949.

== See also ==
- Stig Wikander

== Sources ==
- Sundermann, Werner [in German] (22 December 2017). "SCHAEDER, HANS HEINRICH". Encyclopædia Iranica.
- "HANS HEINRICH SCHAEDER". University of Göttingen.
