= Wilhelm Ritterbusch =

Nazi administrator

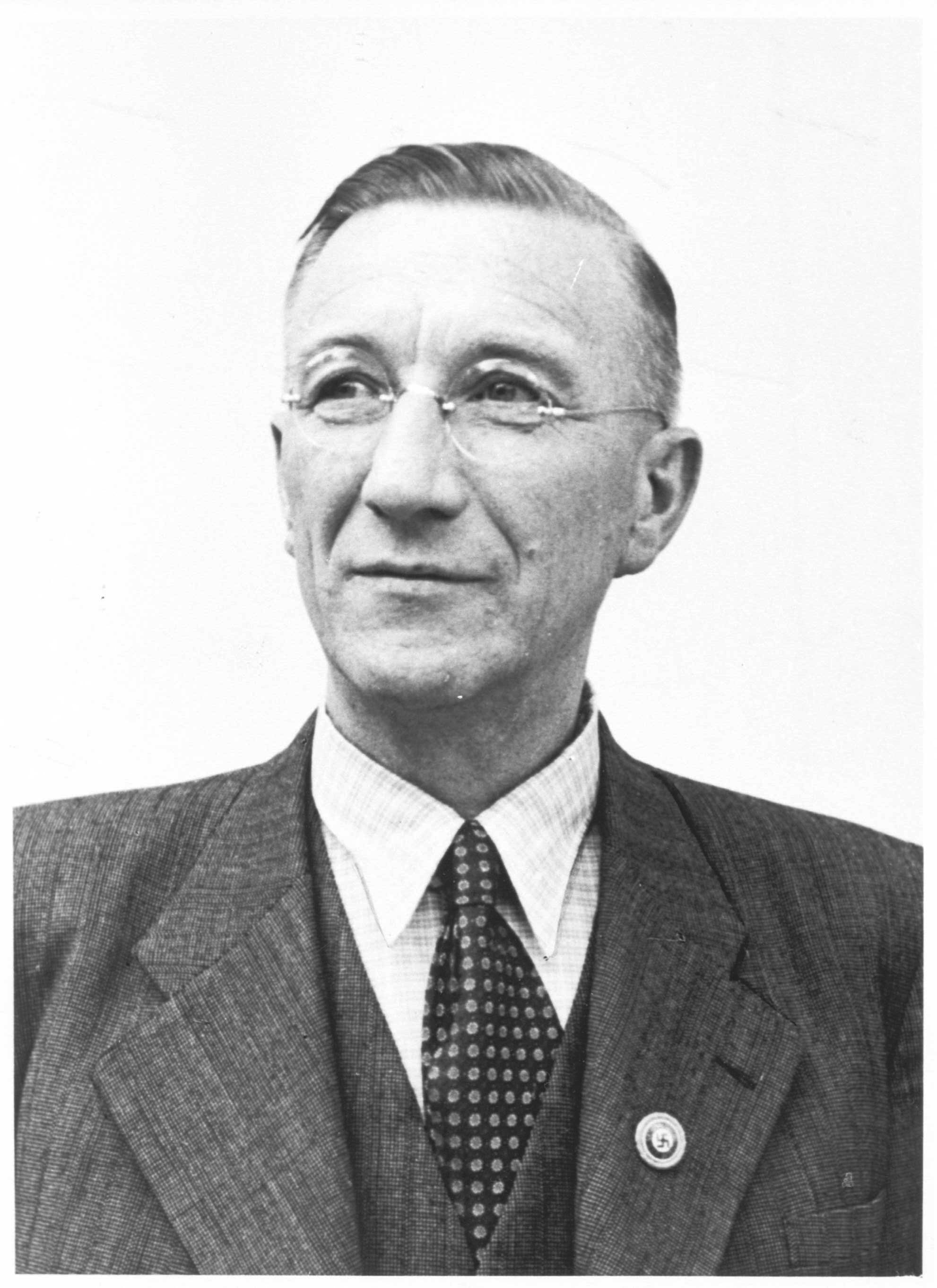
- Ritterbusch in 1943
- Born: Wilhelm (Willi) Friedrich Adolf Ritterbusch; 3 July 1892; Werdau, German Empire
- Died: 1981 (aged 88); Skelund, Denmark
- Military career
- Allegiance: German Empire; Nazi Germany
- Branch: Imperial German Army; German Army
- Service years: 1914–1918; 1939–1945
- Rank: Company commander
- Conflicts: World War I World War II

Wilhelm (Willi) Friedrich Adolf Ritterbusch (3 July 1892, in Werdau, Germany – 10 April 1981, in Skelund, Denmark), was a Nazi Party political functionary. Among other positions, he was the German Generalkommissar zur Besonderen Verwendung ("Commissioner-General for Special Duties"), directing the political affairs and propaganda in the occupied Netherlands from the middle of July 1943 until 7 May 1945, the end of World War II.

== Family ==
Wilhelm Ritterbusch was a son of Hermann Ritterbusch a bricklayer from Zschakau (now Beilrode) a municipality in the district of Nordsachsen, in Saxony, Germany. His brother, Paul Ritterbusch was one of the most prominent NS science functionaries. Another brother, Fritz Ritterbusch, was a Hauptsturmführer of the Waffen-SS and Allgemeine-SS, a member of the guard staff of several Nazi concentration camps, and the commander of the Trautenau-Parschnitz camp.

== Life and work ==
Ritterbusch participated as a company commander in World War I. In 1923, he joined the NSDAP (Member No. 6,316). During the Kampfzeit ("the time of struggle") before 1933, he allegedly worked as a Gauleiter ("Party Leader") for a while. In 1937, he became the Kreisleiter ("County Leader") of the NSDAP in Torgau, Gau Halle-Merseburg.

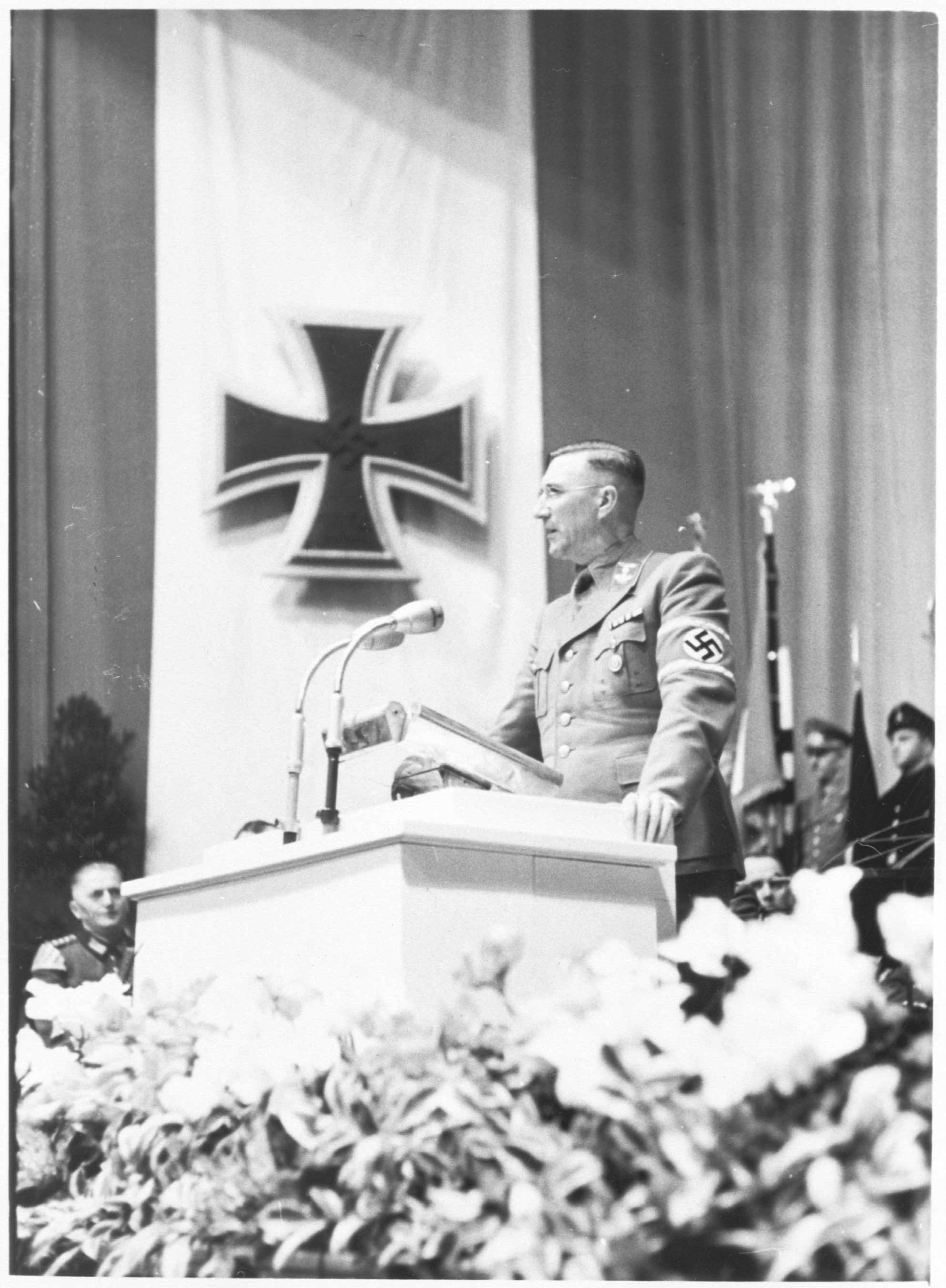
Ritterbusch giving a speech

In the fall of 1939, Ritterbusch was considered by the staff of the Parteikanzlei ("Deputy Führer") for the position of Stellvertreter-Gauleiter ("Deputy Gau Leader"). In September 1939, Helmuth Friedrichs, a department head on the staff of Deputy Führer Rudolf Hess, classified him "to be used on all duties".

After the German occupation of the Netherlands in May 1940, Ritterbusch was assigned to its administration in June. There he was subordinated as Reichskommissar Arthur Seyss-Inquart's Commissioner for the occupied Netherlands' province of North Brabant, to Commissioner-General for Special Duties, Fritz Schmidt. In a report Schmidt judged him to be "the best commissioner of the Reichskommissar in Holland".

From October 1941, Ritterbusch was head of Department II B in the Parteikanzlei ("Party Chancellery") of the NSDAP. Department II B was responsible for the reporting system, propaganda and "celebration organization", as well as training issues within the NSDAP.

Following Schmidt's death under uncertain circumstances in June 1943, Heinrich Himmler and Martin Bormann agreed to appoint Ritterbusch as his successor as Commissioner-General for Special Duties for the Netherlands. Accordingly, Adolf Hitler appointed Ritterbusch to the position and also as Head of the Netherlands Division of the NSDAP. Ritterbusch was thus directly subordinated to Reichskommissar Arthur Seyss-Inquart as one of his four assistants. After Seyss-Inquart and SS representative Hanns Rauter, Ritterbusch was the third most important NS functionary in the occupation administration of the Netherlands. During his time in office, Ritterbusch's highest rank in the hierarchy of the NSDAP was Hauptdienstleiter (Head Service Leader).

In 1943, Dutch resistance fighters launched several deadly attacks against leading Dutch National Socialists. On 5 September 1943, Ritterbusch decided secretly, with the Commissioner-Generals Hanns Rauter and Friedrich Wimmer, to introduce assassinations in reprisal for the resistance attacks. Death squads of the Dutch Waffen-SS were formed. These groups led to the formation of Operation Silbertanne ("silver fir") under Henk Feldmeijer.

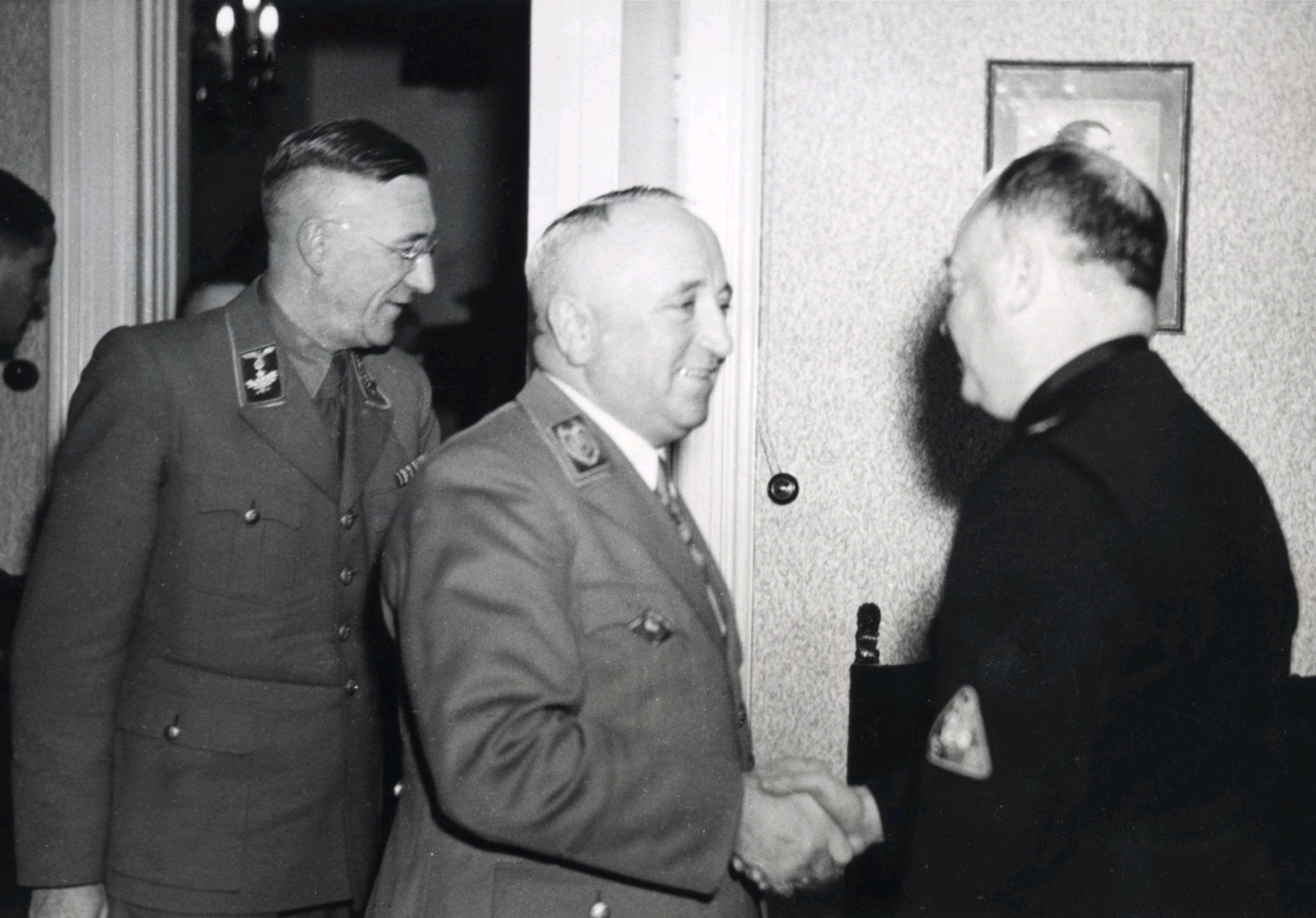
Ritterbusch (left) with Reichsleiter Robert Ley (middle) and Anton Mussert (right), February 1944

During Ritterbusch's time in office as Commissioner-General, the influence of the NSDAP party apparatus in the Netherlands was strongly repressed in favour of an expansion of the SS power base in the occupied country. This was precisely what Himmler had set as his goal before Schmidt's appointment. Schmidt had put many obstacles in the way of the SS. Accordingly, Himmler demanded that Schmidt's successor must be a "strict representative of the Greater Germanic line". Bormann who, since 1942, had pursued a policy of submissive cooperation between the party and the SS, had bowed to this claim with the appointment of Ritterbusch. At a meeting held in The Hague on 30 July 1943, shortly after Ritterbusch's appointment, he was informed by Seyss-Inquart that unconditional loyalty to the SS leadership was a requirement of his future work. The SS representative, Hanns Albin Rauter, judged Ritterbusch as a "quiet, very orderly man of a pastoral character" because of his obedient administration. According to the SS, he refrained from interfering in their "political shaping" and was an exponent of the party who favored the politics of the SS. He was viewed as weak and did not cause the SS any difficulties. Bormann also conceded in a later report that Ritterbusch was not very energetic. However, he rejected the idea of Ritterbusch being appointed head of the NSDAP's main archive as proposed by his co-worker Walkenhorst, who characterized him as a "kind of party philosopher". In history books, Ritterbusch has also mostly been described as a "colourless party functionary".

== Bibliography ==
- Peter Longerich: Hitlers Stellvertreter: Führung der Partei und Kontrolle des Staatsapparates durch den Stab Hess und die Partei-Kanzlei Bormann, Munich 1992, pp. 104 and 180.
