= Großtreben-Zwethau =

- Municipality
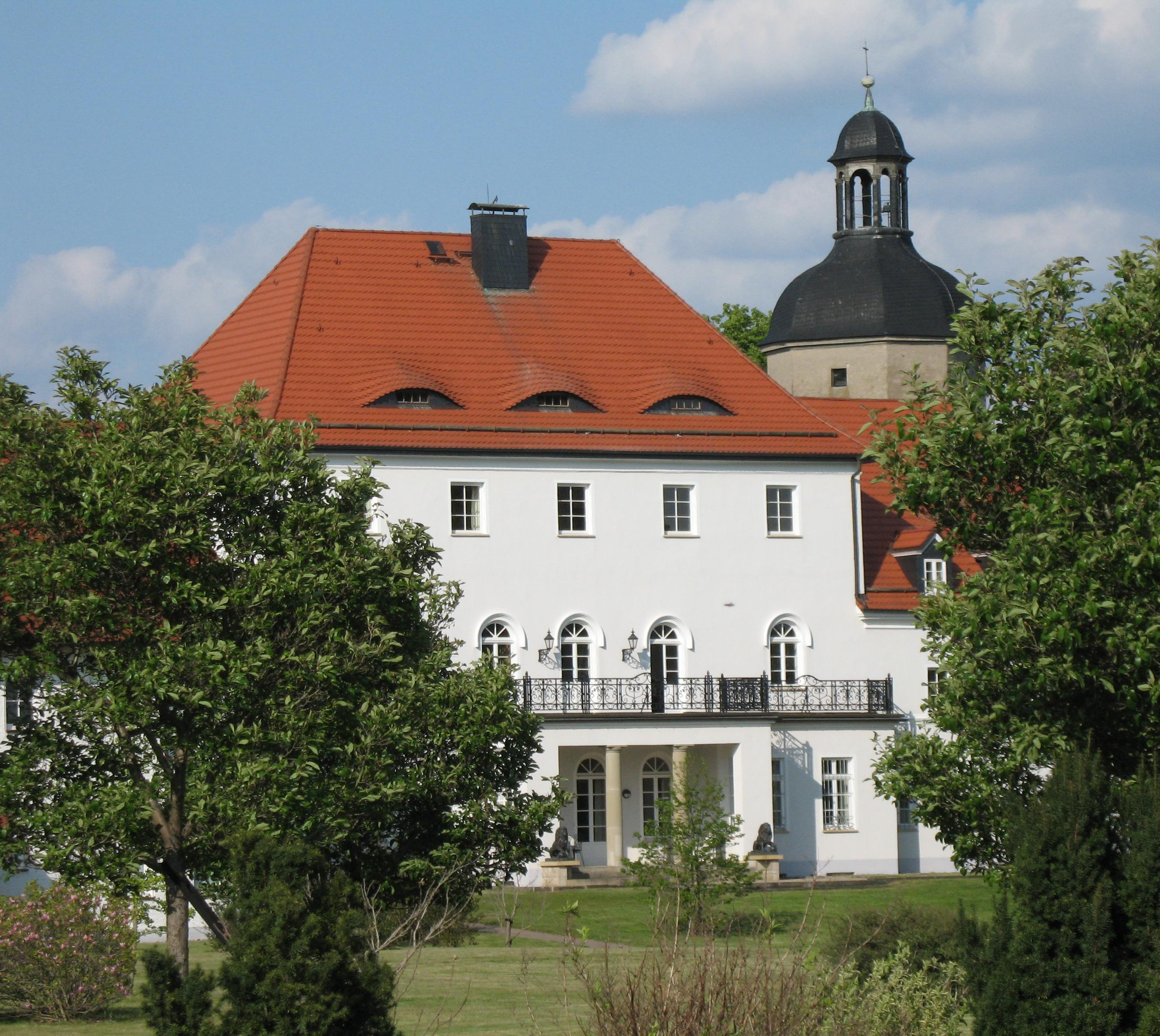
- Manor in Großtreben
- Interactive map of Großtreben-Zwethau
- Location within Germany Location within Saxony
- Coordinates: 51°36′40″N 13°1′30″E
- Country: Germany
- State: Saxony
- District: Nordsachsen
- Disbanded: 1 January 2011

Area
  - Total: 56.49 km^{2} (21.81 sq mi)
- Elevation: 78 m (256 ft)

Population (2009-12-31)
  - Total: 1,998
  - Density: 35.37/km^{2} (91.61/sq mi)
- Time zone: UTC+01:00 (CET)
  - Summer (DST): UTC+02:00 (CEST)
- Postal codes: 04886
- Dialling codes: 03421
- Vehicle registration: TDO

Großtreben-Zwethau is a former municipality in the district Nordsachsen, in Saxony, Germany. It was established in 1994 by the merger of the former municipalities Großtreben and Zwethau. On 1 January 2011, it was absorbed into the municipality Beilrode.

== People ==
- Johanna Wanka (born 1951), politician (CDU)
