= Helmuth Markov =

German politician (born 1952)

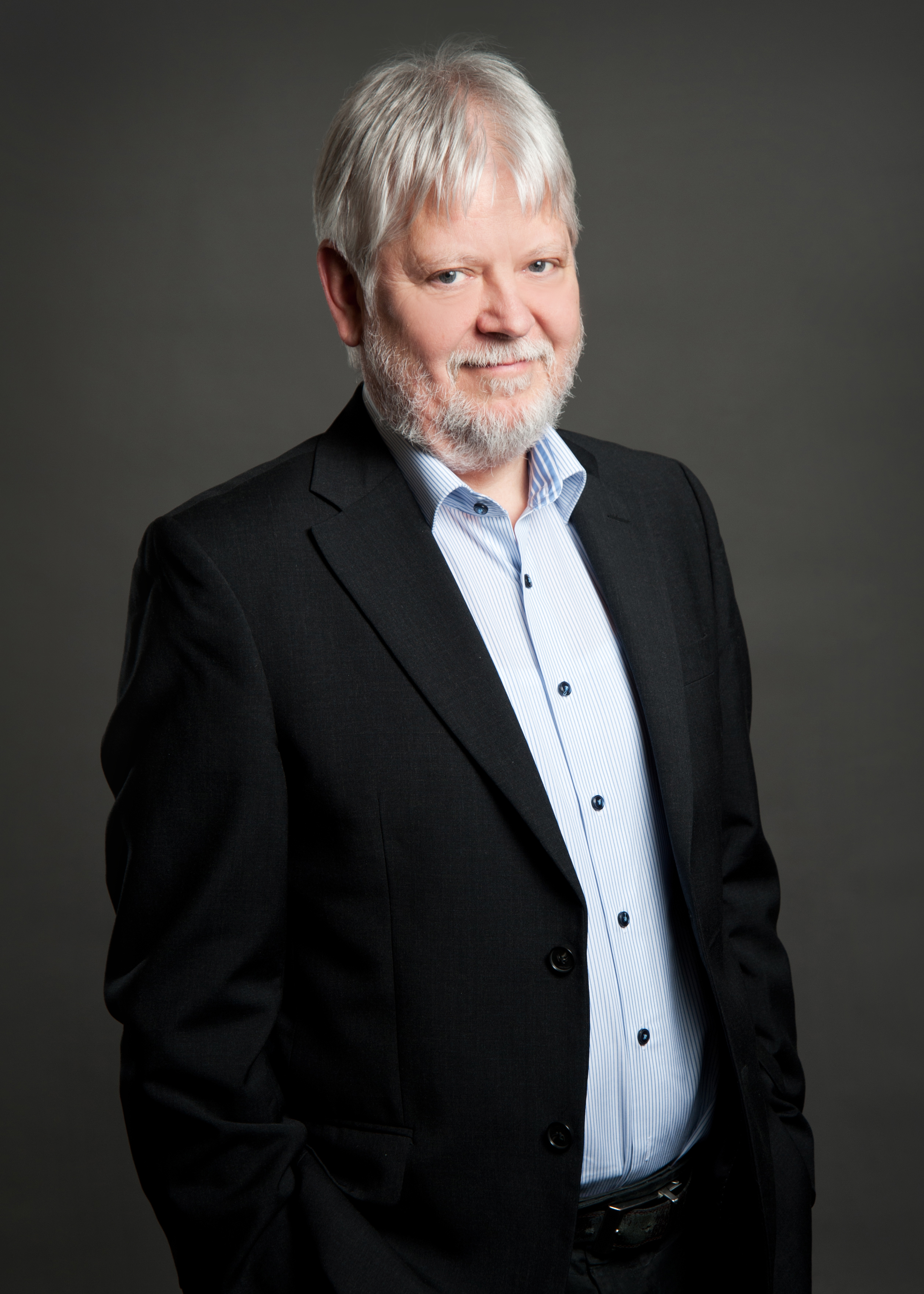
- Helmuth Markov

Minister of Justice of Brandenburg
- In office 2014–2016
- Preceded by: Volkmar Schöneburg
- Succeeded by: Stefan Ludwig

Minister of Finance of Brandenburg
- In office 2009–2014
- Preceded by: Rainer Speer
- Succeeded by: Christian Görke

Member of the European Parliament
- In office 1999–2009

Member of the Landtag of Brandenburg
- In office 1990–1999

Personal details
- Born: June 5, 1952 (age 74) Leipzig, German Democratic Republic
- Party: The Left (2007–); Party of Democratic Socialism (1989–2007); Socialist Unity Party of Germany (1973–1989)
- Parent: Walter Markov
- Education: Kiev Polytechnic Institute

Helmuth Markov (born 5 June 1952) is a German politician.

== Life and education ==
Born in Leipzig, Markov is the son of the German Marxist historian Walter Markov. From 1970 to 1976, he studied engineering at the Kiev Polytechnic Institute, where he got his degree in engineering in 1976. In 1984, he became Doctor of Engineering. Since 25 March 2011, he has been one of four representatives from the state of Brandenburg on the supervisory board of Flughafen Berlin Brandenburg GmbH.

He is married and has three children.

== Politics ==
In 1973, Markov became a member of the SED and was from 1993 to 1995 Regional Chairman of the PDS in Brandenburg.

From 1990 until 1999, he was a Member of Brandenburg's Regional Assembly.

After the European elections in 1999, he became a Member of the European Parliament with the Party of Democratic Socialism (PDS). He was treasurer of the European United Left - Nordic Green Left and sat on the European Parliament's Committee on International Trade. He was a substitute for the Committee on Transport and Tourism and a member of the Delegation to the EU-Ukraine Parliamentary Cooperation Committee.

From 2009 till 5 November 2014, Markov was the Minister of Finance and Deputy Prime Minister of Brandenburg, he was also the Minister of Justice, Consumer Protection and European Affairs of Brandenburg from 21 January 2014 till 22 April 2016.
