= Hildegard Schaeder =

German writer (1902–1984)

- Born: 13 April 1902; Kiel, German Empire
- Died: 11 April 1984 (aged 81); Freiburg im Breisgau, West Germany
- Education: University of Breslau; University of Hamburg
- Occupations: Theologian; Church historian
- Organizations: Prussian Privy State Archives; Confessing Church; University of Göttingen; Protestant church in Germany (EKD); Johann Wolfgang Goethe-Universität
- Awards: Order of Merit of the Federal Republic of Germany; Righteous Among the Nations

Hildegard Schaeder (13 April 1902 – 11 April 1984) was a German theologian and church historian. In her research, she focused on the history and theology of Eastern orthodox churches, with studies not only in Breslau and Hamburg but also in Prague and the Soviet Union where she lived when the Nazis came to power.

In 1934, she returned to Germany, where she worked for the Prussian Privy State Archives, became a member of the Confessing Church and worked in Martin Niemöller parish in Dahlem, caring for persecuted Jews. She was imprisoned from 1943. After the liberation of Ravensbrück concentration camp, she moved to Göttingen, working at the university, and then to Frankfurt where she worked for the Protestant church in Germany (EKD) responsible for Eastern churches, and taught at the university from 1962 to 1978. In 2000, she was posthumously honoured as Righteous Among the Nations.

== Life ==
Born in Kiel, Schaeder was the fourth child of the professor of systematic theology Erich Schaeder and his wife Anna née Sellschopp (1867–1948). She had three brothers; Hans Heinrich Schaeder became an orientalist, Reinhard Schaeder an economist, and Johann Albrecht Schaeder a physicist and brain researcher. She attended a private school first in Kiel and later, after her father had accepted a call from the Silesian Friedrich Wilhelm University, in Breslau, where she achieved the Abitur as an external student in 1920. She studied classical and slavic philology, Eastern European history, Byzantine studies and philosophy at the University of Breslau and the University of Hamburg. At the University of Hamburg, she received her doctorate in 1927 supervised by Richard Salomon with the dissertation "Moskau, das dritte Rom – Studien zur Geschichte der politischen Theorien in der slavischen Welt". After further studies in Prague and the Soviet Union, she returned to Germany in 1934. She began working as a research assistant in the Publikationsstelle Berlin-Dahlem of the Prussian Privy State Archives in Berlin in 1935.

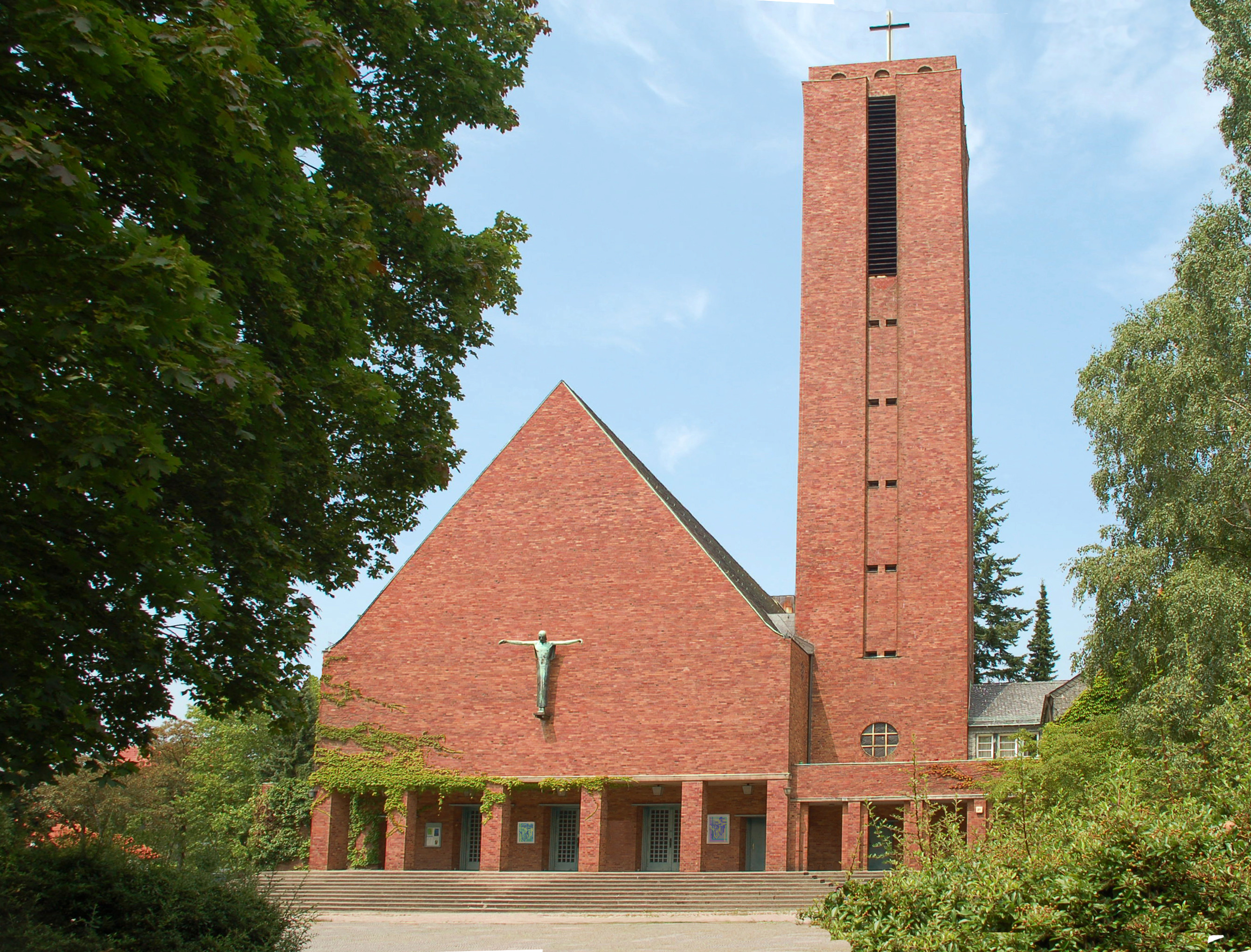
Jesus-Christus-Kirche in Berlin-Dahlem

Schaeder became a member of the Confessing Church in 1934, and from 1935 also worked actively in the Jesus-Christus-Kirche Dahlem, which was ministered by Martin Niemöller. She studied at the Kirchliche Hochschule für reformatorische Theologie which Niemöller had initiated in 1935, and which was run illegally after being banned immediately. A focus of her parish work was the care of Jews who had been deported to the Lublin Ghetto. She also explored hiding places for persecuted Jews in Berlin and supplied food and clothes to those in hiding. After a denunciation, Schaeder was taken into protective custody (Schutzhaft) on 14 September 1943 for "favouring fugitive Jews". She was imprisoned at the Polizeipräsidium Alexanderplatz, and from 1944 as a political prisoner at the Ravensbrück concentration camp, where she was liberated in 1945.

She then worked in a parish in Mecklenburg, but moved to Göttingen, where her mother and siblings already lived after World War II. She was head of the group for Eastern Orthodox Churches at the University of Göttingen. From 1948 to 1970, she worked for the Protestant church in Germany (EKD) based in Frankfurt, as an Oberkirchenrätin responsible for Eastern churches. She also taught at the Johann Wolfgang Goethe-Universität in Frankfurt from 1962, as an honorary professor for the history of the Eastern Churches from 1965 to 1978.

Schaeder died in Freiburg im Breisgau at the age of 81. She was buried at the Waldfriedhof Oberrad in Frankfurt.

== Honours ==
- In 1978 she was awarded the Order of Merit of the Federal Republic of Germany
- Schaeder was awarded – posthumously – as "Righteous Among the Nations" in April 2000
- A street in the Oberrad district of Frankfurt is named after Schaeder

== Publications ==
- Moskau, das dritte Rom – Studien zur Geschichte der politischen Theorien in der slavischen Welt; Hamburg; 1929
- Die dritte Koalition und die Heilige Allianz – Nach neuen Quellen; Königsberg, Berlin; 1934
- Ostern im KZ; Berlin; 1947
- Russische Kirche und östl. Christentum. Edited by Ernst Benz. With contributions from Hildegard Schaeder, Ludolf Müller, Robert Schneider. Tübingen 1949
- Autokratie und Heilige Allianz; Darmstadt, 1963
- Impulse für die evangelisch-orthodoxe Begegnung. Ausgewählte Schriften von 1949 bis 1972, edited by Karl Pinggéra, Jennifer Wasmuth and Christian Weise. Mit einer biographischen Hinführung von Gisa Bauer; Münster 2016 (Forum Orthodoxe Theologie; 17)
