= Jennifer Wasmuth =

Director of the Institute for Ecumenical Research

Jennifer Wasmuth (born 24 February 1969 in Osnabrück) is a German Lutheran theologian and Director of the Institute for Ecumenical Research in Strasbourg, France.

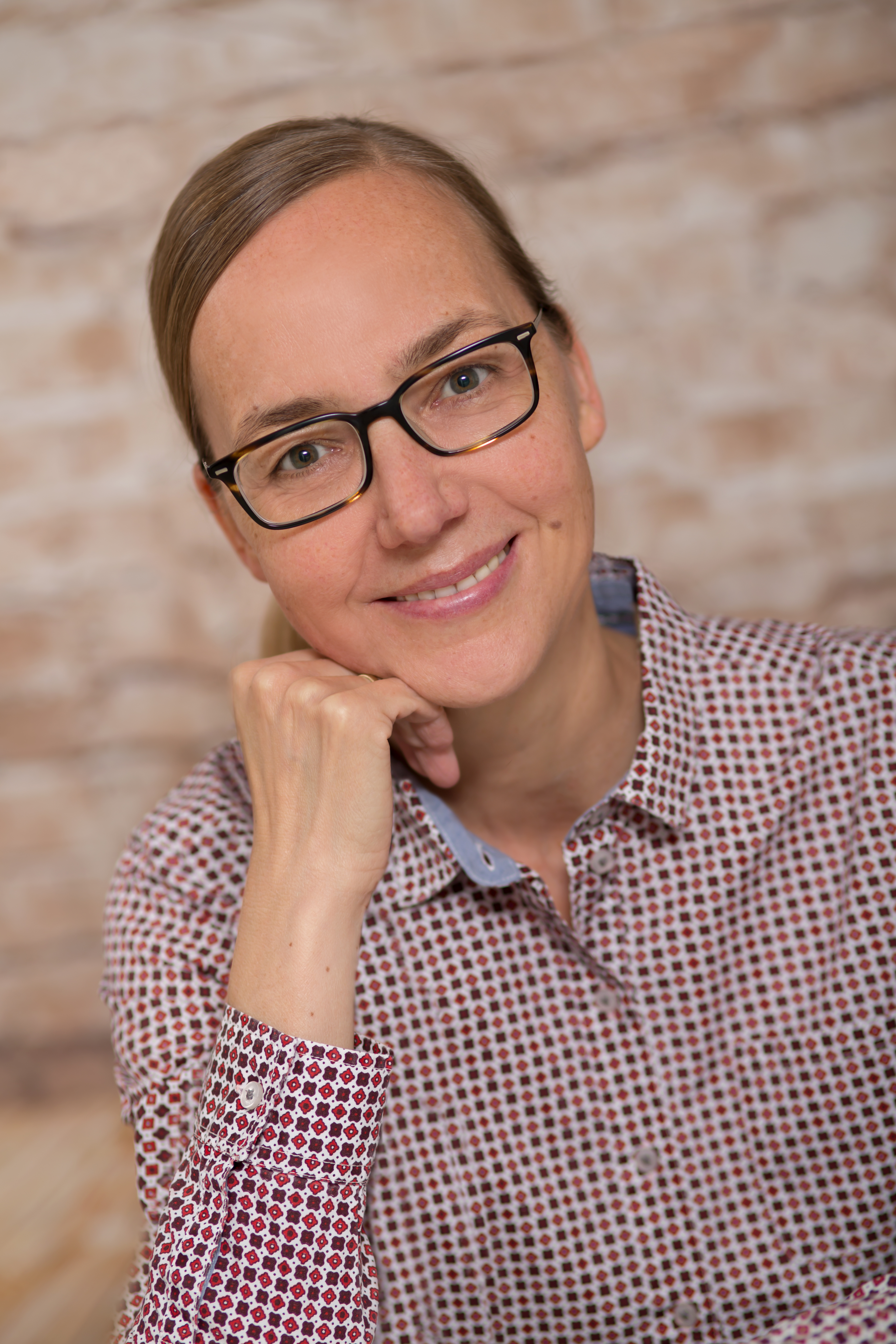
Jennifer Wasmuth

== Biography ==
After graduating from the Greselius-Gymnasium in Bramsche and a period of study at York College in Pennsylvania, she studied Protestant Theology and Slavic Studies at Münster and Heidelberg. A one-year study period at the Spiritual Academy of St. Petersburg was followed by a dissertation under the supervision of Karl Christian Felmy, an Eastern Church scholar from Erlangen. Examining Protestant influences on Russian academic theology of the 19th and 20th centuries, the dissertation explored the phenomenon of liberal Orthodox theology. The dissertation was awarded the Klaus Mehnert Prize in 2006.

From 2004 to 2017 Wasmuth worked at Humboldt University in Berlin for the chair for ecclesiastical and denominational studies/Eastern Church Studies of Heinz Ohme. There she coordinated the project of a Russian-German Theological Dictionary, funded by the German Research Foundation. During this time she also completed her habilitation, in which she researched the meaning of the Nicene Creed, which is central to ecumenism, for Martin Luther and Philip Melanchthon.

Wasmuth is an ordained pastor of the Evangelical Lutheran Church of Hannover. She has been involved in dialogues with Eastern Orthodox churches for many years. These include the bilateral dialogue of the Evangelical Church in Germany with the Moscow Patriarchate and the international dialogue of the Lutheran World Federation with the Byzantine Orthodox churches.

From April 2018 to September 2021 she was director of the Institute for Ecumenical Research in Strasbourg.

Since October 2021, she has held the chair of "Ecumenical Theology with special reference to Orthodox Christianity and its global impact in history and the present" at the Faculty of Theology of the University of Göttingen.

=== Published works ===
- Der Protestantismus und die russische Theologie. Zur Rezeption und Kritik des Protestantismus in den Zeitschriften der Geistlichen Akademien an der Wende vom 19. zum 20. Jahrhundert (= Forschungen zur systematischen und ökumenischen Theologie 113). Göttingen 2007.
- Akademische Theologie im zaristischen Russland in ihrer Bedeutung für die neuere orthodoxe Theologie (= Erfurter Studien zur Kulturgeschichte des Orthodoxen Christentums 11). Erfurt 2012.
- Zwischen Fremd- und Feindbildern. Interdisziplinäre Beiträge zu Rassismus und Fremdenfeindlichkeit (= Fremde Nähe 16). Münster 2000.
- mit Reinhard Flogaus (Hrsg.): Orthodoxie im Dialog. Historische und aktuelle Perspektiven. FS für Heinz Ohme (= Arbeiten zur Kirchengeschichte 130). Berlin 2015.
- mit Vasilios Makrides u. Stefan Kube (Hrsg.): Christentum und Menschenrechte in Europa. Perspektiven und Debatten in Ost und West (= Erfurter Studien zur Kulturgeschichte des Orthodoxen Christentums 11). Frankfurt a. M. 2016.
- mit Karl Pinggéra u. Christian Weise (Hrsg.): Hildegard Schaeder. Impulse für die evangelisch-orthodoxe Begegnung. Ausgewählte Schriften von 1949 bis 1972. Mit einer biographischen Hinführung von Gisa Bauer (= Forum Orthodoxe Theologie 17) Berlin 2016.
