= Fritz Ritterbusch =

German war criminal (1894–1946)

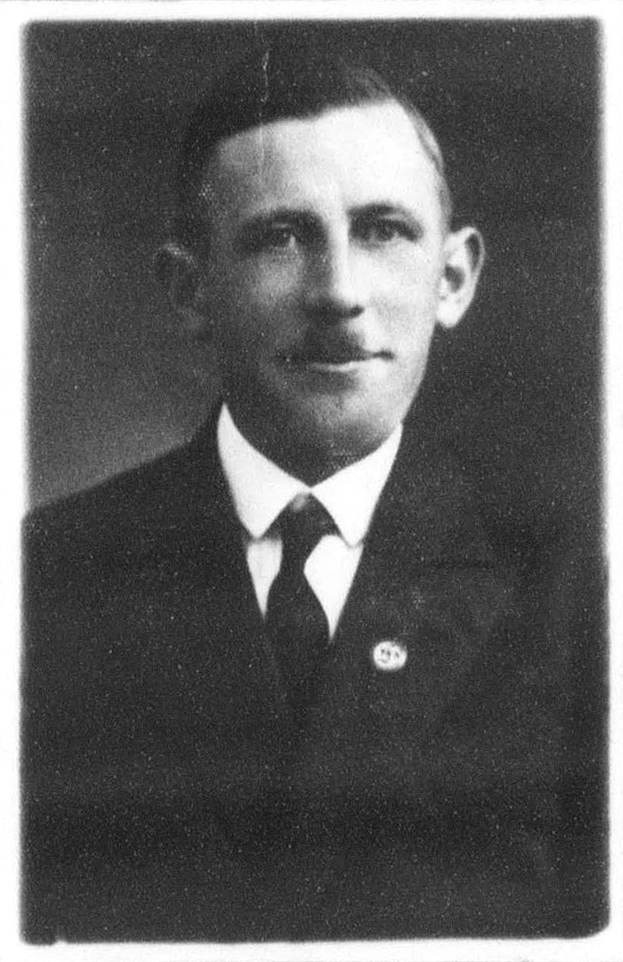
- Ritterbusch ca. 1930
- Born: 11 January 1894; Zschakau; Saxony, German Empire
- Died: 14 May 1946 (aged 52) place unknown
- Military career
- Allegiance: Nazi Germany
- Branch: Schutzstaffel
- Service years: 1931–1945
- Rank: Hauptsturmführer
- Service number: NSDAP #6,317; SS #9,107
- Unit: SS-Totenkopfverbände
- Commands: Commander of the forced-labour camps of the SS-Kommando Trautenau (subcamp network of Gross-Rosen)
- Criminal information
- Cause of death: Execution
- Conviction: Crimes against humanity
- Penalty: Death

Fritz Ritterbusch (11 January 1894 – 14 May 1946) was a Nazi SS-Haupftsturmführer, a member of the crew of the Hinzert concentration camp, Lublin and Gross-Rosen and others. As head of the SS-Kommando Trautenau, he was the commandant of a network of seven camps around Trautenau-Parschnitz.

== Family ==
He was born in Zschakau (now Beilrode) near Torgau, Germany, a professional civil servant. His father Hermann Ritterbusch was a brickworks master from Zschakau. His brother Paul Ritterbusch was a NS-science functionary, his brother Willi Ritterbusch was general commissioner of the Netherlands 1943–1945.

== Nazi military career ==
He participated in World War I, serving in the 153rd and 264th Infantry Regiment. He was a member of the Sturmabteilung, NSDAP on 25 January 1925 (Member No. 6,317) and SS from 1931 (Registration No. 9,107).

From early 1940 to 30 January 1941 he held an unspecified role in the Division IV camp Flossenbürg concentration camp, where then was transferred to the post of commander of one of the camp guard companies. The camp moved to the headquarters staff of Hinzert concentration camp, where he was adjutant to the commandant of the camp, Paul Sporrenberg. On 18 June 1943 he moved to KL Lublin.

In March 1944, he was assigned to the KL Gross-Rosen as head of the SS-Kommando Trautenau, a network of seven women’s subcamps in the Trautenau region, a position he held from May 1944 to 13 February 1945. The so-called SS-Kommando Trautenau was based in Parschnitz (Poříčí, now part of Trutnov, The Czech Republic). This camp complex included the women’s subcamps of Bausnitz, Bernsdorf, Gabersdorf, Ober Altstadt, Parschnitz (Poříčí), and Schatzlar, as well as the subcamps of Liebau and Ober-Hohenelbe (Hořejší Vrchlabí), which were established in September 1944. The majority of female prisoners were aged between 14 and 29. Prisoners deemed too ill to work were transferred to Auschwitz II-Birkenau. On 30 January 1945 he was carried to Hauptsturmführer. In February and March 1945, Ritterbusch ordered inspections in several subcamps subordinate to the SS-Kommando Trautenau, during which physician Josef Mengele carried out selections of sick and pregnant female prisoners.

He was arrested by Soviet forces on 1 January 1946. On 25 March 1946 he was sentenced to death by a Soviet Military Tribunal, a special form of a court-martial. On 14 May 1946 Ritterbusch was executed at an unknown place.

In November 2002 his trial was revisited by the Main Military State's Attorney of Russia and the sentence was confirmed.
