= Beilrode =

- Municipality
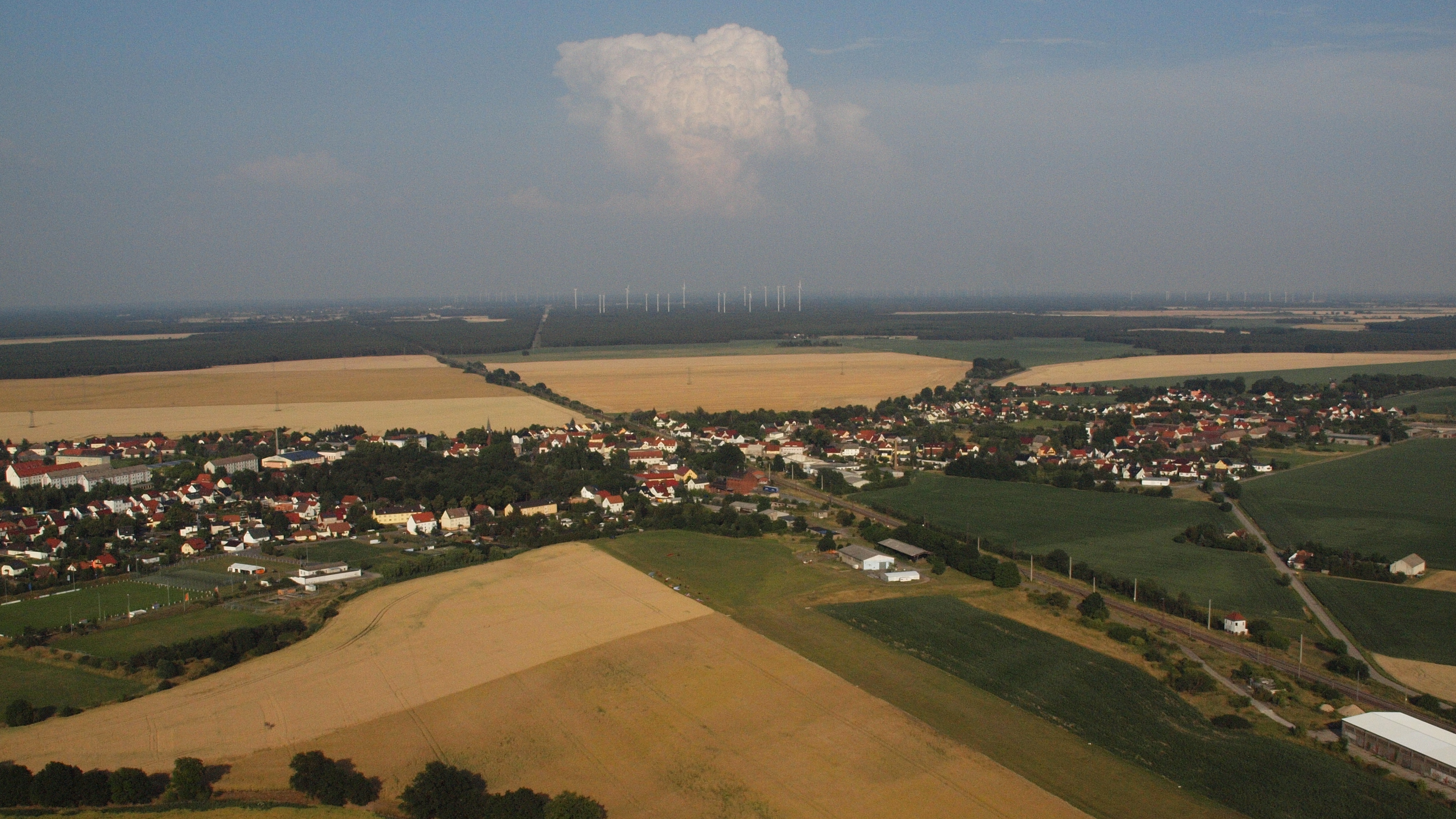
- Aerial view

- Coat of arms

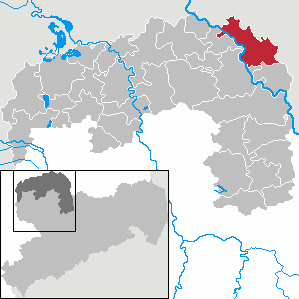
- Location of Beilrode within Nordsachsen district
- Interactive map of Beilrode
- Location within Germany Location within Saxony
- Coordinates: 51°34′N 13°4′E
- Country: Germany
- State: Saxony
- District: Nordsachsen

Government
  - Mayor (2023–30): René Vetter (Ind.)

Area
  - Total: 92.67 km^{2} (35.78 sq mi)
- Elevation: 82 m (269 ft)

Population (2025-12-31)
  - Total: 4,153
  - Density: 44.81/km^{2} (116.1/sq mi)
- Time zone: UTC+01:00 (CET)
  - Summer (DST): UTC+02:00 (CEST)
- Postal codes: 04886
- Dialling codes: 03421
- Vehicle registration: TDO, DZ, EB, OZ, TG, TO
- Website: beilrode.de

Beilrode is a municipality in the district Nordsachsen, in Saxony, Germany. It absorbed the former municipality Großtreben-Zwethau in January 2011. It consists of the Ortsteile (divisions) Beilrode, Dautzschen, Döbrichau, Döhlen, Eulenau, Großtreben, Kreischau, Last, Neubleesern, Rosenfeld and Zwethau.

== Notable residents ==
- Fritz Ritterbusch (1894–1946), German Nazi SS concentration camp commander executed for war crimes
