= Walter Markov =

German historian

- Born: Walter Karl Hugo Mulec; 5 October 1909; Graz, Austria-Hungary
- Died: 3 July 1993 (aged 83); Summt, Brandenburg, Germany
- Education: Leipzig; Cologne; Berlin; Bonn
- Occupations: Historian; university professor; writer; resistance activist
- Political party: KPD; SED
- Spouse: Irene Bönninger (m. 1927)
- Children: 5

Walter Karl Hugo Markov (Note: Due to the multicultural nature of Austro-Hungary and the multilingual character of his own family, two family names from the time of his birth are given: "Mulec" in Slovenian and "Markov" in German) (born Mulec; 5 October 1909 – 3 July 1993) was a German historian. Shortly after he received his doctorate, a promising academic career was interrupted in 1934 when he joined the (by this time illegal) Communist Party and briefly became a resistance activist. In 1935 he was sentenced to twelve years in prison, but ten years later in April 1945, as the Hitler regime collapsed, he was one of a number of long-term inmates from the Siegburg jail who organised their own "self-release", with the help of two pistols that he had been able to purchase, already loaded, on the prison black market.

After the war, according to more than one source he became one of very few historians from the German Democratic Republic who built a reputation for serious historical scholarship beyond the confines of the East German academic establishment.

== Biography ==
=== Provenance and an itinerant childhood ===
Markov was born into a Protestant family in Graz, an industrial and administrative city along the mainline between Vienna and Trieste, in the heart of what was still at that time the Austro-Hungarian empire. The family was Austrian, albeit with ancestral origins in several different parts of the empire. Franz Mulec (1881–1974), his father, was a sales representative working for the Deutsches Kalisyndikat (potash fertiliser producer). Franz Mulac came from a Slovenian farming family that had been present in Lower Styria since at least as far back as the eighteenth century. Walter's mother, born Minna Auguste Isabella Schellbach (1889-), is described in sources as a languages teacher. She came from Vienna and was the daughter of a businessman who worked in the printing sector. As a result of her family background she would always regard herself as a true "German German" ("Reichsdeutsche"). One year after Walter's birth the family moved on to Laibach (as Ljubljana was known at that time) in connection with Franz Mulec's work, where they remained till 1915. For the rest of the war they returned to Graz where Markov attended a "protestant private school". In 1919 they went back to Laibach. Over the next few years he attended school successively in Laibach, Kranj and Belgrade. In 1925, while still at school in Laibach, he involved himself in politics, campaigning with a group of friends for the "Liberal Social Democrats" (SDS). By 1927, when he passed his school final exams (Abitur), he was fluent in several different languages and attending school in Sušak (Rijeka).

=== University ===
Later that year he enrolled at the University of Leipzig to study History. He received financial support from the Austrian branch of the evangelical Gustav Adolf Association and therefore added Theology to his studies, taking care to ensure that, as far as his sponsors were concerned, his principal focus was not on History but on Theology. Markov's autobiography dwells at length on his student years, which were happy and rewarding. He writes of a cycling tour undertaken in the Rhineland during the 1928 summer vacation: the tour was not without disappointments. He complains about the heavy traffic on the roads beside the river, which was unusually heavy due to the Olympic Games being held in Amsterdam: just outside Bonn he was involved in a collision with a motorcyclist: he did not like the very acidic wine people drank in that little city: in Cologne the cathedral was simply too large for a decent photograph: Düsseldorf was worth checking out: but Duisburg and the large heavily industrialised region behind the port was the "ugliest piece of all Germany". After his Rhineland cycling tour Markov began to find life in Leipzig unattractive: "So unlike the Rhine ... off to the liberal German Rhineland!". Less than a year after that cycle tour, in March 1929 he took the train to Cologne. His sponsors at the Gustav Adolf Association had accepted that his talents and preferences led him towards History rather than Theology, and recommended Cologne University (or, failing that, Bonn) even though in Catholic Cologne an evangelical Theology faculty did not even exist. Following his transfer to Cologne he was assigned lodgings at a parsonage in Roggendorf, more than 50 km (nearly an hour by train) from the city centre. He was to combine his university studies with work as a home tutor. Roggendorf was on the edge of Zone A (the demilitarised zone), while Cologne was still in Zone B, occupied by French forces since the end of war. However, for the history student there were no difficulties encountered in crossing between the two zones. Nevertheless, the distance was too great for daily university attendance, and he missed many lectures. A particular influence during his time at Cologne was the left-wing economic historian Bruno Kuske who did not shy away from a positive assessment of Soviet economic performance since the October Revolution. He was also impressed by Johannes Ziekursch, a specialist on the history of Silesia, who delighted Markov with his trenchantly critical evaluation of the iconic Prussian king, Frederick the Great.

Markov's was able to indulge his enthusiasm for travel with several lengthy cycle trips into the Belgian countryside. However, at the end of 1930 the Roggendorf parson died and his widow gave up on her duties as a landlady. Markov's immediate reaction to the loss of his lodgings was to return to Leipzig, but he subsequently transferred to Berlin University. Berlin was the fulcrum of the polarised politics and gridlocked parliamentary process that would lead, two years later, to the cancellation of democracy in Germany. It is not clear that in Berlin he was particularly diligent in attending lectures. As a student of political history Markov nevertheless enjoyed a ringside seat for the accelerating collapse of what Adolf Hitler had scornfully derided at a party rally in 1929 as the "Republic of Weimar". Markov also managed several more trips, including visits home to his parents in Austria. His own political sympathies lay not with the National Socialists, nor with the shrinking band of political moderates, but with the Communists. For the summer term of 1933 he moved on yet again, this time to the University of Hamburg, intending to study for a doctorate with Richard G. Salomon, an expert on eastern European medieval history. Unfortunately the Hitler government had taken power in January. They lost no time in translating the ugly antisemitic rhetoric of their opposition campaigning into a pillar of government strategy. Salomon was Jewish which made his professorial position untenable. (He would be formally removed from his academic post in March 1934.) Markov's plans needed to be rethought. It was Salomon who recommended that Markov should now move to the University of Bonn and complete his doctoral work under the supervision of the "brilliant" ("in allen Farben ... schillernden") historian Fritz Kern, who had long since moved beyond the confines of his earlier speciality as a medievalist. Markov now took the train (with his bicycle) to Bonn in October 1933, spending his first night there in a youth hostel. He was filled with confidence that Kern was "the director of the only Institute for Universal History in Germany", he had found his doctoral supervisor of choice. Admiration was evidently mutual.

On 3 January 1934 Fritz Kern invited Markov to dinner. Over a glass of wine, the famous historian urged his latest protégé to produce a dissertation and obtain his doctorate without further delay. He suggested the longstanding Serbian prime minister Nikola Pašić as a suitable subject. Just four weeks later, on 1 February 1934, Walter Markov submitted his dissertation entitled "Serbien zwischen Österreich und Russland, 1897-1908". (Note: "Serbia between Austria and Russia 1897-1908") The doctorate, awarded on 28 February 1928, was accompanied by a Summa cum Laude commendation. Kern himself arranged for the dissertation to be published the next year.

=== Resistance ===
It was also in 1934 that Walter Markov, now employed as a research assistant at the University of Bonn joined the Communist Party. In the aftermath of the Reichstag Fire the government had made the party illegal in March of the previous year. Thanks to his experiences at Hamburg, Markov by now had a pronounced political agenda, and was telling friends that he regretted not having joined the party earlier, while he was still studying in Hamburg. An important friend, in political terms, was Hannes Schmidt who had transferred from Hamburg to Bonn the term before Markov made that move. Schmidt already had contacts with the illegal Communist Party while he was still in Hamburg. The two had met in Fritz Kern's lectures. In the dangerous atmosphere of the times they initially dealt with one another cautiously, but once satisfied that they really were both on the same side they formed the nucleus of what became a five-man party resistance cell. They were joined by Günter Meschke, a former mathematics student who had arrived in Bonn in April 1934 hoping to be able to obtain a doctorate in history. Markov and Meschke had got to know one another when they had lived in the same student hostel in Berlin-Weissensee during 1931/32. The fourth member of the group was Arthur Toynbee (1910-1975), eldest son to the celebrated English philosopher-historian. whom Markov would later describe as a "highly gifted, good looking, but melancholy Englander who thought that communism was a 'great idea'," but one which could not be pushed through in England. The fifth man was a theology graduate called Hans Schadow. In the new Germany Schadow was doomed to be something of an outsider and therefore a government opponent: his family came from Niedamowo (near Danzig), and he had been unable to demonstrate to the authorities that all four of his grandparents came from good German stock. He had therefore never been issued with an Aryan certificate ("Ariernachweis"). (Markov nevertheless suspected that Schadow's communist commitment might be less than whole-hearted.)

In May 1934 these five men set up a "University Communist Party Group" ("Gruppe Universität der KPD"), commandeering for their purposes a presumably little-used room in a tower assigned to the university's Institute of Celtic Studies ("Keltologische Institut"). They agreed to a monthly subscription of two marks each, in order to build up a "fighting fund". Markov, who had a university post, managed to have their meetings in the room in the tower listed as a Russian course, and the university, therefore, provided a five hundred mark payment to cover the summer term. It was both a strength and a weakness of the cellular structure of communist resistance groups that the Markov group had no contact at all with the persecuted communist party officers of the Bonn subdistrict ("Unterbezirk Bonn"), nor with the banned Communist student group ("Kostufra"). An idea attributed to Arthur Toynbee was that they could at least take steps to enlighten English-language tourists visiting the country about the true nature of the National Socialist regime. Appropriate leaflets were drafted. One source for the texts was leaflets that the ever travel-hungry Markov had picked up in Luxembourg in March 1934, when he had taken a bus to the Grand Duchy in connection with a "World Cup Qualifying Match" involving the Germany national football team. They gathered more material when Markov, Meschke, Toynbee and Schadow took a cycling trip to the Saarland which had been under French military occupation since 1919 and was therefore, for most purposes, beyond the reach of the German security services. In Saarbrücken they were able to speak with exiled members of the party leadership, but they were not (at this stage) provided with the contact addresses that they had been hoping for. While they were in the Saarland Markov took the precaution of opening a bank account with a French bank which he thought might be of use in the future.

Back in Bonn, the group discussed further moves. There was discussion of a possible assassination in front of the Alexander Koenig Museum in connection with an expected visit to the city by Hermann Göring, which might be used to attract further recruits to the cause. Eventually, they managed to establish a link with the underground Communist Party. This came about through Hannes Schmidt who by now was engaged to a woman classified by the authorities as a half-Jew. As a drummer and jazz fan, Schmidt had acquired some "street credibility" in local "Bohemian" circles. Schmidt was able to make contact with a pharmacist called Charlie Fromme (1908-1958) and a bookshop owner called Karl Limbach (1911–1972) in October 1934, which turned out to be the long-awaited contact with the party leadership for the local subregion ("Unterbezirksleitung"). It turned out that by this time Walter Markov was also under surveillance by the security services. Markov's doctorate in February 1934 had been followed by a graduation ceremony in July 1934 at which discussion had turned to Wilhelm Pieck, already a leading figure in the hierarchy of the German Communist Party. Someone present had thought it worthwhile to report details of the conversation, in which Markov had participated, to the authorities. Nevertheless, Markov was not arrested during 1934 and the group remained unmolested by the authorities, suggesting that at this stage they still were not minded to take the Markov group very seriously.

During the winter term of 1934/35 contacts between Markov's group and the underground subregional party team grew closer. Markov, whose middle names were "Karl" and "Hugo" took to using the initials "CH" to sign his articles in the resistance newspaper "Sozialistische Republik" for which he had himself chosen the title and which for the time being was filled almost exclusively with his own contributions. By now his home was under surveillance and mail was being intercepted. This was done so openly that Markov later speculated that it was not the government directed Gestapo who were responsible, but good local Catholics from the Bonn city police department trying to warn him of the danger in which he was placing himself. Sources indicate that in the end the Markov group were betrayed by people believed to be fellow communists who were involved in carrying illicit party mail. Hans Schadow was arrested on the evening of 8 February 1935: Markov the next day.

=== Arrest ===
Markov's arrest took place in the office of the Theologian-Orientalist and department director Paul Kahle (who himself would escapee to England in 1939). Markov at this stage still held a Yugoslav passport, and might easily have been able to escape, but that was not how matters turned out. He was taken initially to the police station in Bonn's City Hall Square, and then successively to prisons in Bonn, Essen and Berlin. Charged with high treason, it was in Berlin that on 4 May 1936 he faced trial with his group in the special People's Court. Meschke was sentenced to a six-month jail term and Schadow to twelve months. Possibly because he was identified as the leader of the group, Markov was sentenced to twelve years. Anthony's famous father, Arnold Toynbee, made the journey to Berlin in order to intercede personally with a government minister, Hanns Kerrl. In the case of Walter Markov, however, any impact resulting from Toynbee's intervention was outweighed by Markov's attitude in court: he showed no contrition and held resolutely to his principles.

=== Prison ===
Markov spent the rest of the Hitler years in the prison at Siegburg (near Cologne). Most of the sentence – according to one source eight years of it – was spent in solitary confinement. He later described the work he was given as "tiresome, but not difficult" ("lästig [aber] nicht schwer"): plucking hemp, sorting tinfoil ([possibly for flak production, knitting army socks with a machine or embroidering raffia bags. He remained loyal to Stalin and rejected privileges (such as a razor). He refused to submit voluntarily to medical or dental care. He welcomed the chance to network with other prisoners, and not just the communists. One of his friends on the inside was Michael Jovy. After the war they went their separate ways, and when Markov next met Jovy, in 1980 at an international historians' congress in Rumania, Jovy was serving as the West German ambassador to Bucharest.

During 1944 the long stretches of solitary confinement came to an end, and Markov found himself sharing two or three-person cells. Interventions by his mother and from his old university supervisor and mentor, Fritz Kern brought some improvement in his conditions including, in 1944, a transfer from the "tailoring hall" – where the lice on soldiers' clothing sent in for repair constituted a constant health threat – to the prison library. He was also given an off-site assignment to work at a section of Bonn University (approximately ten kilometers / six miles away) that had been destroyed by aerial bombing, to rescue (part of) Fritz Kern's library from the rubble. Fritz Kern was by now turning out to be a valuable friend in time of trouble. Some months later he handed over 2,000 Marks with which Markov would be able to purchase two loaded pistols on the black market that was operating inside the prison. In the face of many setbacks, including a serious Typhus outbreak, the transfer of fellow inmates on whose support he had been counting, the retaliatory shooting dead of three fellow inmates from Luxembourg following an attack and intense overcrowding, Markov championed the idea of an armed uprising among the inmates against the prison staff. As matters turned out, it was only a matter of a few days before American troops appeared on the outskirts of Siegburg that Walter Markov and some companions succeeded in overpowering the prison guards and managers. When the Americans arrived they installed Markov and a selected team of political prisoners to run the prison in place of the overpowered former guards. The priority, for the Americans, was to keep the inmates inside the prison, because they were fearful that once released the infected inmates would unleash an indiscriminate Typhus epidemic on the civilian population and occupying forces alike in Bonn and the surrounding area. In the event Markov's career as a prison governor proved brief, however, since the other inmates rejected the idea of being managed by a self-proclaimed communist and took steps to "disempower" him.

=== After the war: British occupation zone ===
In the end Markov, too, contracted Typhus. He was taken into various hospitals and facilities outside Siegburg, but in June 1945 was able to return to Bonn, the city where he had been building his academic career more than ten years ago before he was arrested.He found a centrally located room which he was able to rent as a sub-tenant. He was unable to return to a permanent post at the university, however. The university rector was now Heinrich Konen who was unwilling to back an application from an avowed antifascist who was even now devoting his energies to rebuilding the (no longer illegal) Communist Party. Markov became, in addition, an active backer of the Soviet-inspired (and, it would become increasingly apparent, Soviet influenced) Free German Youth organisation, as well as of the General Students' Committee ("Allgemeiner Studierendenausschuss") and the "Cultural Association" ("Kulturbund") which was also widely assumed to be taking direction from fraternal comrades over in the Soviet occupation zone. In 1946 Walter Markov joined the newly formed Socialist Unity Party ("Sozialistische Einheitspartei Deutschlands" / SED) which had been created through a contentious political merger between the Communist Party and the Social Democratic Party. The idea was to prevent any future resurgence of right wing populism by creating in Germany a single united party of the political left. In the event, whatever plans may originally have existed for the political merger to be implemented across the four occupation zones, it was never implemented outside the Soviet occupation zone. In the three western zones the SED was viewed with suspicion, as a thinly disguised tool of Soviet expansionist aspirations. Although Markov may still, in 1946, have been undecided about his future career trajectory, he will have been aware that his SED membership closed off many career options in the universities sector of the three occupation zones that would be joined together and relaunched, in 1949, as the German Federal Republic (West Germany).

=== After the war: Soviet occupation zone ===
With the question of where to build his future still unresolved, Markov considered moving back to Slovenia – by now part of Yugoslavia – or Graz (still in Austria) in order to be near his parents and wider family. He rejected the idea partly because he believed his family had been insufficiently resolute in opposing the National Socialists during the German occupation. He did, during 1946, make several trips to Berlin. During one of these, he attended an historians' conference at the Hotel Adlon in the eastern half of the city (and therefore in the Soviet zone). At the conference he was able to make himself noticed by giving a reply to the speech of welcome given by Anton Ackermann, a leading member of the team engaged since 1945 in implementing a well planned nation-building exercise under the supervision of the military administration and the leadership of Walter Ulbricht. Shortly after the conference Markov received two job offers: one came from the University of Greifswald in the extreme northeast of the Soviet zone and the other came from the University of Leipzig in Saxony. He chose Leipzig, he later explained, because the university rector that year was the distinguished philosopher Hans-Georg Gadamer. It was still 1946 when he relocated from the Rhineland to Leipzig on the banks of the Pleiße. As a Marxist historian he had seen no future for himself in the western part of Germany. There are also indications that he was troubled by political developments in the western zones. Many years later he said that his decision might have been different if he had been able to foresee, in 1946, the 1968 developments in the West German universities.

=== Irene ===
It was in Leipzig that Walter Markov teamed up with Irene Bönninger. Originally from Mönchengladbach, she is the sister of one of Markov's comrades from his time in Bonn. She had moved to Leipzig to study. One source identifies her as a librarian. The two of them married in 1947. That was followed by the births of the couple's five children between 1948 and 1957.

=== Professor in the Soviet occupation zone ===
In his new role as a Leipzig university professor, Markov retained elements of his old "critical spirit". During 1947/48 he joined up with a teacher from Fulda called Martin Hellweg to represent the Communist Party and the SED in the deliberations of the Imshausen Society, a coming together of approximately forty intellectuals from the four occupation zones. The goal was to chart a future for Germany. There was talk of "a third way" and of a "synthesis between east and west". There was an underlying assumption that military occupation would not last forever, and that when it came to an end there should be a realistic set of plans in place for a strong Germany, united in a spirit of rejection against any possible revival of National Socialism. There is no indication that Markov's participation was mandated or endorsed by the political authorities in the Soviet occupation zone: they already had their own plans.

Also in 1947 Markov received his habilitation (higher academic qualification), not from the University of Leipzig but from the University of Halle, 50 km / 30 miles to the north-west, where he briefly took a teaching professorship from April till November 1947. The topic of his dissertation was the "basics of Balkan diplomacy" and the various relationships and interdependencies between the Balkan states. (Note: "Grundzüge der Balkandiplomatie. Ein Beitrag zur Geschichte der Abhängigkeitsverhältnisse", Leipziger Universitätsverlag, 1999) Many years later, in 1999, the dissertation was published as a book by the university press.

In 1949 he returned to Leipzig, now with a full professorship and a teaching chair in modern history ("Allgemeine Geschichte der Neuzeit"). He now lived and worked at Leipzig till his retirement in 1974. He served between 1949 and 1968 as director of the (semi-autonomous) Institute for Cultural and Universal History ("Institut für Kultur- und Universalgeschichte") which since its establishment by Karl Lamprecht in 1909 had established a rich tradition of scholarly achievement. From 1951 he was also director of the Institute for General History ("Institut für Allgemeine Geschichte"); and between 1951 and 1958 he served as Director of the Institute for the History of the Soviet Peoples ("...für die Geschichte der Völker der UdSSR ") - later renamed as the Institute for the History of the European Popular Democracies ("...für die Geschichte der europäischen Volksdemokratien").

=== Career swerve ===
A career-threatening development came in 1951, at which point Markov had still done little to modify his reputation as an "unorthodox" thinker. An increasingly nervous party leadership suddenly accused him of "Titoism" and "Objectivism" in January 1951. This may have arisen at least in part out of a reading of his 1949 habilitation dissertation on the complexities of nineteenth and twentieth-century rivalries in the Balkans. Markov was now excluded from the party. (Irene Markov retained her membership.) At the same time, he was stripped of his official (and prestigious) status as a Victim of Nazi Persecution ("Verfolgter des Naziregimes"). He was permitted to maintain his academic career. Nevertheless, his field of study abruptly changed from the nineteenth and twentieth century Political and Diplomatic History of the Balkans to an intensive study of the Fourth Estate in pre-revolutionary and revolutionary France.

From research undertaken at the Stasi Records Agency it becomes apparent that for approximately two years Walter Markov was active as one of approximately 100,000 Stasi informants in East Germany. In February 1959 a Stasi officer called Rauch, visiting him in his apartment, obtained a verbal commitment ("Verpflichtungsgespräch") from Markov that he should provide reports on people he came across in the course of his work. Slightly unusually, there seems never to have been a signed written declaration of commitment. Rauch reports that Markov was constantly nervous of damaging his personal relationships with friends and academic colleagues in other universities: Rauch was understanding. There are references in the files that Rauch created to a "gentlemen's agreement". Rauch, who became Markov's Stasi handler, was chiefly interested in his "international" contacts, meaning members of the academic community in West Germany and the "capitalist abroad". (In practice, outside West Germany espionage on behalf of Warsaw Pact governments was usually undertaken by the KGB, whose reports went directly to Moscow.) There can be no guarantee that surviving files at the Stasi Records Agency present a complete picture of Markov's work for the Stasi. Rauch appears to have been one of Markov's former students who hoped to gain promotion within the service by making use of his re-established contacts with his former professor. Their meetings were generally brief (but presumably long enough for an exchange of reports and instructions), and took place roughly once every two months, either in Markov's apartment or at the university. The relationship seems to have fizzled out during 1961. Nevertheless, Markov's academic career ran relatively smoothly during the 1960s and 1970s and his international reputation grew. This, and the fact that during the 1960s he began to receive the "usual national honours" (starting, in 1961, with the National Prize), indicate that one way and another the period of his work for the Stasi coincided with a certain level of informal rehabilitation, following his dramatic fall from grace back in 1951. There is no record of his having been officially readmitted to the SED before 1989, however.

=== Jacobins and enragés ===
Two particular focuses of Markov's researches on the French Revolution involved the contributions of the Jacobins and of the so-called Sans-culottes. In the process, he established the basis for a left-wing radical interpretation. As he chronicled the demands of the Jacobins, Markov was among those who recognized clear adumbrations of another revolution, the Proletarian revolution choreographed by Marx. Moving beyond mainstream traditions of Marxist historiography he placed new emphasis on the small but influential group of working-class radicals known as the Enragés. "Die Freiheiten des Priesters Roux", his 1967 biographical study of the executed radical priest Jacques Roux, turned out to be the first in a four-volume biographical study which provided a characteristically careful and detailed study of a man hitherto more usually consigned to a couple of paragraphs. For Walter Markov, Roux represented "a consistent plebian egalitarianism". (Note: ...als "Vertreter eines eines konsequent plebejischen Egalitarismus") The work gained for Markov a reputation in East and West Germany, and further afield, as a scholar prepared to shun "top-down" history in favour of history told "from the bottom upwards". An additional side-effect of his switch from Balkan to French history was the extent to which he was able to network internationally, notably with hist friends, the hugely influential French left-wing historian, Albert Soboul. In contrast to most East German citizens, he appears to have enjoyed unrestricted international travel privileges, at least from the early 1960s.

=== Internationalist ===
A further sign that official attitudes had changed since 1951 was Walter Markov's admission, in 1961, to full membership of the (East) German Academy of Sciences and Humanities. He was also a co-founder and became president of the Deutsche Afrika Gesellschaft ("German-African Society"), of which he held the presidency between 1961 and 1969. During 1962 and 1963, Markov spent time at Nsukka in Nigeria as the first Director of the History Department at the new university. In 1963 he briefly held a guest professorship in Sri Lanka, but throughout and beyond the 1960s, even though he was the recipient of a number of academic awards and prizes from foreign universities, most of his research and teaching still took place in Leipzig.

During 1970/1971 he taught at the University of Santiago in Chile (which under the Allende presidency became an important ally of the German Democratic Republic). By this time, partly as a result of his overseas visits and contacts, he was acquiring an academic interest in the recent history of liberation struggles and decolonistation in what people in Germany at this time were beginning to refer to as the "third world". In 1968 he became the first director of the Department for African and Near-Eastern Studies which he had set up at the University of Leipzig. His research interests also broadened out to embrace "world history in the revolutionary context" ("Weltgeschichte im Revolutionsquadrat") which was the title of a book he published in 1979.

=== Final years ===
Walter Markov retired from his university posts in 1974. His later years were encumbered by poor health, but he continued to publish regular articles in the academic press and to observe the progress German Democratic Republic from his Marxist perspective. In his retirement he could never have been classified as a signed-up critic of the régime; but nor were his contributions entirely bereft of criticism. His interest in comparative revolutionary research was carried on by his former student Manfred Kossok.

Two serious heart attacks in 1983/1984 reduced his productivity. He continued to work on his memoires and agreed to a few interviews about aspects of his earlier life. After the changes which paved the way for democracy and reunification, at the end of 1989, he joined the Party of Democratic Socialism (PDS), which was a newly relaunched and rebranded incarnation of the old East German ruling SED party, now struggling - ultimately with considerable success - to adapt itself for a democratic future.

Walter Markow died on 3 July at de:Mühlenbeck (Mühlenbecker Land)Summt am See, a small lakeside settlement just outside Berlin.

== Awards and honours (selection) ==
- 1958 Medal for Fighters Against Fascism
- 1959 Patriotic Order of Merit in silver
- 1961 National Prize of the German Democratic Republic 2nd class
- 1965 Golden Pin-badge of the League for People's Friendship
- 1974 Patriotic Order of Merit in gold
- 1977 Honoured University Teacher of the DDR
- 1978 Honorary Senator of Karl Marx University, Leipzig
- 1978 Friedrich Engels medal from the (East) German Academy of Sciences and Humanities
- 1979 Star of People's Friendship in silver
- 1984 Outstanding People's Scholar ("Hervorragender Wissenschaftler des Volkes")
- 1989 Patriotic Order of Merit gold clasp

== Publications (selection) ==
- Serbien zwischen Österreich und Russland 1897–1908. Kohlhammer, Stuttgart 1934 (Dissertation, Universität Bonn, 1934).
- Grundzüge der Balkandiplomatie. Ein Beitrag zur Geschichte der Abhängigkeitsverhältnisse. 1947 (Habilitationsschrift, Universität Leipzig, 1947); Leipziger Universitätsverlag, Leipzig 1999, ISBN 3-933240-97-2.
- Die Freiheiten des Priesters Roux. Akademie Verlag, Berlin 1967; Leipziger Universitätsverlag, Leipzig 2009, ISBN 978-3-86583-396-9.
- Exkurse zu Jacques Roux. Akademie Verlag, Berlin 1970.
- mit Albert Soboul: 1789, die große Revolution der Franzosen. Akademie Verlag, Berlin 1973.
- mit Heinz Helmert: Schlachten der Weltgeschichte. Edition Leipzig, Leipzig 1977.
- mit Ernst Werner: Geschichte der Türken von den Anfängen bis zur Gegenwart. Akademie Verlag, Berlin 1978.
- Weltgeschichte im Revolutionsquadrat. produced by Manfred Kossok. Akademie Verlag, Berlin 1979.
- Kognak und Königsmörder. Historisch-literarische Miniaturen. Aufbau Verlag, Berlin/Weimar 1979.
- Grand Empire. Sitten und Unsitten der Napoleonzeit. Edition Leipzig, Leipzig 1984.
- Zwiesprache mit dem Jahrhundert. decumented by Thomas Grimm. Aufbau Verlag, Berlin 1989, ISBN 3-351-01512-7 (autobiography).
- Wie viele Leben lebt der Mensch: Eine Autobiographie aus dem Nachlass. Faber & Faber, Leipzig 2009, ISBN 3-867-30092-5

Walter Markov's published legacy includes approximately 800 papers and articles, published in journals such as Die Weltbühne, Sinn und Form and the Zeitschrift für Geschichtswissenschaft. There are also around 30 monographs.
