= Fritz Kern =

German historian

- Born: Max Friedrich Ludwig Hermann Kern; 28 September 1884; Stuttgart, Württemberg, Germany
- Died: 21 May 1950 (aged 65); Bonn, North Rhine-Westphalia, German Federal Republic (West Germany)
- Education: Lausanne; Tübingen; Berlin; Kiel
- Occupations: Historian; University professor Writer-journalist
- Employer(s): University of Bonn; University of Frankfurt am Main
- Spouse(s): 1. Bertha von Hartmann (1886 - ) 2. Elisabeth Charlotte Ahrens (1904 - )
- Children: 4

Fritz Kern (28 September 1884 - 21 May 1950) was a German medievalist historian who became involved in politics. He held teaching chairs on History at Frankfurt (Main) University between 1914 and 1922, and at Bonn University between 1922 and 1946.

== Life ==
=== Provenance ===
Max Friedrich Ludwig Hermann Kern - always identified in sources simply as Fritz Kern - was born into an upper middle-class Catholic family in Stuttgart. Both his parents came from legal-administrative "establishment" families, and were members of what would have been considered Württemberg's "minor aristocracy". Hermann von Kern (1854–1932), his father, was a senior government administrator who later became a "Staatsrat" (loosely, "national councillor") for the Kingdom of Württemberg. His mother, born Marie von Hufnagel (1860–1944), was a daughter of Georg Ludwig von Hufnagel (1825–1900), a lawyer who towards the end of his career served as senate president (in this instance a senior judicial position) in Stuttgart. Fritz Kern had a sister who was four years younger than he was and a brother who was eleven years his junior.

=== Formal education ===
Following two years in a pre-school, Fritz Kern was still only eight years old when he was enrolled at Stuttgart's prestigious Karls-Gymnasium, a "humanist" secondary school with a strong focus on Greek and Roman culture in its curriculum. He continued to attend this school for ten years. Kern was a scholarly pupil, winning many prizes including one, in 1902 for a speech he delivered as part of the celebrations for of the emperor's birthday, on the intriguing subject "Frederick the Great as Crown Prince". After passing his school final exams, during 1902/03 he spent two terms at the University of Lausanne studying Jurisprudence, out of respect for his family's traditions. Lausanne was chosen both on account of its climate and the perceived purity of the lakeside air, thought likely to reduce his tendency to Bronchitis and in order that he might perfect his French. However, in 1903 he decided he wished to become not a lawyer but an historian. His father agreed to this change of direction only with the greatest reluctance. There followed six terms as a history student, of which the first two were spent studying at Tübingen where he was taught by Georg von Below (1858 - 1927), who became a life-long friend. Von Below had a reputation as a fierce defender of prevailing traditions of political and constitutional historiography: he was more than happy to share with students his own fascination with the precision of the legalistic presentational style habitually involved with constitutional history. In 1904 Kern moved to the Friedrich Wilhelm University (as the Humboldt was known at that time) in Berlin. Here he passed through the school of Karl Zeumer (1849 - 1914), a noted specialist in legal history. Another tutor at Berlin by whom he was particularly strongly influenced was Dietrich Schäfer, an old fashioned German nationalist whose lectures on medieval history positively glowed with enthusiasm as he related the deeds and exploits of the more heroic among the German emperors of the medieval period. Schäfer was an unapologetic advocate of the "Greater Germany" solution to the problem (from the perspective of Berlin) of what to do about Austria. On 15 August 1906, still aged only 22, Kern received his doctorate at Berlin for a piece of work entitled "Dorsualkonzept und Imbreviatur. Zur Geschichte der Notariatsurkunde in Italie". His dissertation earned him a "magna cum laude" certification from the assessors and a "valde laudabilis" commendation from his own supervisor. It was published towards the end of that same year as a book. His doctoral research concerned the history of deeds issued by notaries in Italy: it was supervised by Michael Tangl (1864 – 1921).

=== Academic progression ===
Over the next two and a half years Kern made a number of lengthy "archive study trips", visiting France and England in 1908 and, possibly most importantly, Italy during the first part of 1909. Between 1906 and 1908, working under the auspices of Karl Zeumer he was employed as a research assistant for the long-running Monumenta Germaniae Historica project, on which scholars were by this time working on the third volume. Kern's old tutor, Karl Zeumer, had taken responsibility for the period covered by the reign of Charles IV - roughly the third quarter of the fourteenth century. Zeumer was in failing health and losing his sight. Kern provided extensive practical help in terms of collating, transcribing and publishing primary source document. During his foreign visits over this period he was able to work both on the Monumenta Germaniae Historica and on his own complementary researches which concerned the evolution of state institutions and political developments more generally in Medieval France.

His marriage towards the end of 1909 prompted the realisation that he could not afford to lead a life of total independence. Fritz Kern received his habilitation (higher academic qualification) on 10 November 1909, this time from the University of Kiel. The qualification opened up the path to a life-long university career, and he now accepted an academic post at Kiel as a "Privatdozent" (sub-professorial tutor). The post involved no class teaching duties, and he was for the most part able to determine his own academic timetabling. There were also important developments in his personal life at this time. He earned his habilitation with a piece of work on the early centuries of French expansionist policy up until 1308 ("Grundlagen der französischen Ausdehnungspolitik bis zum Jahre 1308"). The dissertation was published in book form in 1910. Although it highlights its author's formidable skills as a meticulous researcher and interpreter of sources, the book also repeatedly discloses elements of the underlying Franco-German antagonism which were features of the intensified Franco–German rivalry that followed the Franco-Prussian War, but which post-1945 appear as distractions in a work focused on developments in the Medieval period. It is fair to add that during the id-1920s, apparently influenced by the foreign policy approach of Gustav Stresemann, Kern came round to a more mainstream view of the evolution of the France during the medieval period, seeing the issues in the context of European political evolution more broadly. With regard to the twentieth century, however, his fevered preoccupation with Franco–German enmity would endure. In 1913, despite his relative youth, Fritz Kern was offered and accepted an extraordinary professorship at Kiel.

=== Government service ===
In July 1914 he accepted the offer of a full professorship in Medieval and Modern History at the newly launched University of Frankfurt. At 30, he was the youngest of the university's professors. Weeks later, war broke out. For Fritz Kern it became an over-riding duty to seek out men of political influence and make himself available for "political" work: between 1914 and 1918 he undertook government work, at times in place of and at times in parallel with, his university responsibilities. Under-secretary of State Zimmermann persuaded the university authorities that Kern's first term at the new university should be replaced by a "holiday" whereby his linguistic abilities and familiarity with "abroad" might be used in the service of the imperial state. His initially assignment on behalf of the Foreign Ministry involved travelling to Rome where he worked on influencing the press. (Italy entered the war only in May 1915, following careful negotiation and calculation by the government over which side to back.) There were also briefer missions on behalf of the German Foreign Ministry to Bucharest and Constantinople. Kern was also able to engage in networking during his time working for the foreign ministry, becoming acquainted with Foreign Minister von Bülow, who later turned out to be a valuable political ally.

After working for some weeks as a simultaneous interpreter among the prisoners of war being held at the processing facility at Döberitz, in August 1915 he took charge of setting up and then running an "archive" for the "Nachrichten-Offizier-Berlin" (NOB: loosely, "military intelligence service in Berlin"). Although described in some sources as an archive, the department he headed up also specialised in various other document related activities, involving coded messaging, helping to brief German intelligence operatives sent to work abroad and producing false identity papers for them. Between 1916 and 1918 he was in effect commuting on a slightly irregular basis between Berlin and the family home at Kronberg, at the end of the local railway line into Frankfurt, ten miles away. Given the stress and pressures of combining family duties with two demanding parallel careers in different parts of the country, his health - never robust - deteriorated: during several months directly following the war he largely absented himself from the public sphere, and was seriously ill during the winter of 1918/1919.

During the war and directly after it Kern became an increasingly vocal and fervent advocate of an intensely nationalist-conservative position, grappling passionately with the "war guilt" question. Notably, he teamed up with Grand admiral von Tirpitz during 1918/19 to compose an autobiographical memoir on behalf of the latter. The access afforded to the private papers and insights of a "larger than life" figure who had known the emperor well, served in the imperial navy - mostly in the upper ranks - for more than half a century, and combined his naval service with ministerial office for nearly two decades, was an invaluable resource for Kern as an historian and as a constant participant on the fringes of politics. On a personal level the two remained firm friends until von Tirpitz died, in 1930. The Tirpitz memoire was viewed by critics as explosive because of the way, they thought, it carefully sought to put the role of the German military in an "appropriate" light. The book also highlighted the importance of sustaining Germany as a bulwark on behalf of western Europe against "Bolshevism". (The former Russian empire was undergoing its own Civil War agonies throughout this period.) Despite his support for conservatism, Kern was careful to steer clear of the extremist right. Nevertheless, at least during the immediate post-war period, Kern was no admirer of the new republican order, and viewed the emergence of democratic institutions and practices during 1918/1919 with deep misgivings.

=== After the war ===
December 1919 marked a reinvigorated return to political engagement as Fritz Kern became the producer of Die Grenzboten, a weekly (or sometimes fortnightly) literary and political magazine steeped in the still potent National liberalism that had emerged during the nineteenth century. His own contributions dealt with characteristic passion about the tragic denouement of the war, returning frequently to material included in the Tirpitz memoire. Over the next few years he engaged in politics through his parallel career as a journalist and commentator. Meanwhile, in 1922 he moved down-river, from Frankfurt to the University of Bonn, where Friedrich von Bezold, by now aged 73, had retired the previous year. Kern succeeded to the Bonn History professorship. His wife and children remained in the family home just outside Frankfurt for more than a year, but in July 1923 a suitable newly constructed "professor house" became available for rent in the Baumschulwäldchen quarter of the town and they joined him in Bonn.

The period was one of domestic and international crisis, with the value of money collapsing and French forces still occupying the Rhineland as the government in Paris sought to exploit problems over reparations as justification for the permanent annexation of this coal-rich part of Germany, or at least the permanent conversion of it into a quasi-autonomous "buffer state" under French influence. Towards the end of 1923 Kern was involved in obtaining weapons from the army for the students "defending themselves against Rhineland separatists" who had launched an anti-government insurrection in Aegidienberg and the surrounding countryside. The background to the incident is one of desperate economic austerity coupled with considerable political complexity and disagreement over finding a way ahead: Kern's interest was presumably fuelled by the fact that the so-called Siebengebirge ("seven hills") insurrection took place a short distance upriver from Bonn where he was now working.

During the middle and later 1920s various events took place which went some way towards "normalising" Germany's relations with the rest of Europe. These included the conclusion, in 1922, of the Treaty of Rapallo with Russia and the various Locarno Treaties of 1925, along with the Dawes Plan of 1925 and the Young Plan of 1929 which dealt with the war reparations issue. Through this period, and even more clearly during the early 1930s, Fritz Kern's own attitudes to the international situation also evolved. He became increasingly committed to cultural exchange and mutual understanding between nations and peoples, and to the need for pan-European reconciliation. As the Great Depression's economic crisis was followed by destructive levels of unemployment, political polarisation and parliamentary deadlock, during the run-up to 1933, Fritz Kern in his journalism and teaching became preoccupied with preventing a National Socialist government from coming to power in Germany. Any retreat from his traditionalist ultra-conservatism remained at best ambivalent, however. During the early months of the Hitler government the security services were principally concerned with targeting communists. Kern was clearly no communist. Nevertheless, he had for many years been warning Germans against Hitler, and as the nature of the regime became ever clearer he was clearly, as a known opponent of the National Socialists in some danger. Between 1933 and 1944 Fritz Kern remained in Germany, choosing a form of "Inner emigration" which, especially before 1939, seems to have involved staying in Bonn and focusing on his university responsibilities.

=== Twelve Hitler years ===
It is known that, as early as 1934, Fritz Kern was closely associated with the anti-government resistance group set up at the University of Bonn by the Communist doctoral student Walter Markov. He continued to support Markov's group even after Markov himself was arrested, sentenced, and in 1936 imprisoned, despite the associated dangers to himself.

War returned in September 1939. Kern was keen to rush to Berlin and make himself available to go back to his "old job" - presumably a reference to his work between 1915 and 1918, running an archive for the intelligence department on behalf of the Combined Military High Command ("Oberkommando der Wehrmacht" / OKW). In Berlin he found that a group of conservative traditionalists under the leadership of Vice-Admiral Wilhelm Canaris and General Major Hans Oster had already set in place a clandestine opposition to the government's war preparations, which within the higher echelons of the military establishment were widely deplored or mistrusted. Subsequently, Kern also came into contact with the Prussian Finance Minister Johannes Popitz and other members the so-called Wednesday Society. At some point Kern's willingness to work for the military success of Nazi Germany evolved into a position of opposition to the war, and he was persuaded to remain quietly in Bonn. he was never among the leaders of the anti-war movement, however. His personal life was also in crisis, as he was forced to accept that his elder daughter was incurably ill and would never be able to support herself. In 1941 Fritz and Bertha Kern were divorced. Kern remarried later that year. At around the same time his entire library was destroyed by enemy bombs.

As far as can be determined, between 1941 and 1944 Fritz Kern underwent a form of self-imposed exile, trying to keep out of the way of the authorities and avoiding contact with opposition groups or anyone else of possible significance to the security services. He did not simply remain in Bonn, however, but seems to have left the Rhineland as frequently and for as long as the opportunities allowed. The late summer and autumn of 1941 he spent on the shores of the Bodensee. During the summer of 1942 he spent two months in Slovakia (which was a German puppet state through the war years). Between August and October 1943 he took an extended summer vacation near Graz where, thanks to contacts sustained through the 1930s, he was able to use a library and call upon the services of research assistants. In October 1943 he arranged for his extensive accumulation of "research materials" to be conveyed to Öblarn, a remote village in the mountains between Graz and Salzburg, and in August 1944 he joined them there. However, he subsequently arranged to have his family and surviving worldly goods sent to Kißlegg, close to the Bodensee and the frontier with Switzerland.

Between 1942 and 1944 Canaris and Oster played a desperate double-game as members of the military establishment who were also in touch with British intelligence. Johannes Popitz went a step further, conducting secret talks during the summer of 1943 with Heinrich Himmler, attempting to persuade the government "minister for almost everything" to turn his back on the leader and take part in attempts to negotiate with the Americans and British in order to obtain an "acceptable peace". With the benefit of hindsight it is clear that the hopes of the Canaris group were far-fetched. Nevertheless, it is apparent that in or before October 1944 Fritz Kern became a member of the resistance group. Popitz, Canaris and Oster were all unmasked and during the closing weeks of the war executed for their treason. Through a sense of duty, by the time the University of Bonn was destroyed in a bomb attack on 18 October 1944, Kern was back in town. He survived the destruction and made his way to Berlin, but before Christmas 1944 was back in Kißlegg. In February 1945 Fritz Kern entrusted his German assets to the custody of a lawyer in the border-town of Lindau, and on 27 April he crossed into Switzerland. Two days the Swiss authorities arranged for Kern's wife and child to be "most gently kidnapped" (to quote the English language term used in an allied report of the matter) and bought across the frontier to join him. Had Kern been aware that the German surrender was less than two weeks away, and that he would be banned from returning to Germany for the next three years, it is far from certain that he would have chosen the "emigration" option.

=== Swiss exile ===
After May 1945 the eastern third of Germany became parts of Poland and the Soviet Union while the western two thirds were divided between the principal allied powers into four military occupation zones. The military occupation authorities saw no reason to prioritize the return of exiled Germans, which was accordingly prohibited by default. It was not the 1918-style armistice that Kern had anticipated and for which he had been prepared. In Switzerland he had no money and no work permit. Instead of a quick return home he was stuck in Basel with his wife and their youngest child, surviving on the small amounts of income that his wife was able to earn from domestic work in the homes of strangers (which was allowed without a work permit). It was a period of acute privation. Optimistic that they would soon be allowed home, Kern remained near the frontier, in Basel. As far as hunger and his always delicate health permitted, he worked in the libraries there on his latest academic preoccupations. After accepting that the enforced Swiss exile was not coming to an end any time soon he moved to Fribourg, settling near the university. He was able to obtain some support for historical research work from the Societas Verbi Divini in Posieux-Froideville, having already established a relationship of trust with the society's large Vienna Mission in the course of his travels and studies during happier times. The principal product of his studies during this period was a much expanded version of his 1932 essay "Anfangen der Weltgeschichte" which would be published posthumously as "Die Anfänge der Weltgeschichte. Ein Forschungsbericht und Leitfaden" in 1953.

Meanwhile, on 17 November 1945 the University of Bonn was permitted to re-open, and "that part of the teaching body remaining intact" were invited to present themselves to a commission of enquiry established by the university senate in order that any necessary "cleansing" ("denazification") requirements might be determined. Kern was self-evidently still "intact" and he expressed the hope that he might be permitted to return on a special train being organised by "the Quakers", and so resume his teaching duties for the Summer 1946 term. However, he had been personally isolated from colleagues (and from virtually everyone else) during the war years, and his flight to Switzerland had opened him up to suspicion and bureaucratic hurdles. As it became clear that the university was in no hurry to welcome him, and his health continued to deteriorate, he instead applied for early retirement. During 1945/46 he had undergone three surgical interventions in connection with a long-standing kidney disease. 1947 was a year of medical urgency thanks to an inflamed appendix which was deemed inoperable on account of the weakened condition of his heart. The alternative treatment, involving a savagely light diet, kept him alive for three more years, but his deteriorating health was nevertheless by this stage a continuing concern. Fritz Kern's retirement took effect at the end of term in July 1946, while he himself was still in Switzerland. Due to lengthy denazification procedures on which the British military authorities insisted, the retirement process took a further nine months, and so formally took effect only on 1 April 1947, by means of a letter dated 17 April 1947 and supplied by the appropriate ministry department. Kern now hoped and believed that his return to Germany could no longer be deferred. Meanwhile, after a long period of "preparation", in the first part of 1948 he signed a contract with Francke Verlag, a publishing house in Bern, for a ten volume "Historia Mundi" ("History of the World"). Ideas for the project had evidently been forming in his mind for many years, and securing the publication contract represented the fulfilment of a longstanding ambition: in the event the work would not be published during his lifetime, however.

There were further delays before Kern was able to resume his German residency. He was now in receipt of income in Germany now including, presumably, his university pension, but for the first eight months following his formal retirement any money he received in occupied Germany was directed into a special closed account due to inscrutable financial regulations imposed by the British military authorities, the ambiguities of which were copper-plated with ultra-cautious interpretations inferred by nervous German officials. It was only on 17 August 1948 that Kern was able to enter the French occupation zone of Germany, thanks to the intervention of his old friend Jean de Pange who arranged for his invitation to join a History Symposium in Speyer, after which the payments began to flow again, though they continued to be subjected to a 10% deduction by the authorities until the currency reforms of 9 May 1949. By that time, however, he was at least no longer prevented from returning to Germany.

=== Detoxifying history teaching ===
In Autumn 1948, notwithstanding the bureaucratic hurdles involving visas and other documentation and the continuing deductions on his currency receipts, Kern felt well enough to undertake a major round trip in connection with the ten volume "Historia Mundi" for which he was making preparations. Between 20 September and 14 November he visited Amsterdam, Brussels, London and Paris, renewing old contacts and setting up new ones. In December he spent more time in Paris. In January 1949 he visited Bonn and Düsseldorf in order to try and resolve "salary issues" before setting off on a second round trip on 19 January in connection the "Historia Mundi" project. This time his trip, lasting around seven weeks, took him to Strasbourg, London, Paris and Madrid. During the second half of March 1949, while he was passing through Baden-Baden and Speyer, he was contacted by Raymond Schmittlein, the general director for Cultural Affairs in the French zone, with an invitation to become involved in a project for the "detoxifying" German history books used in the schools. Kern elaborated the idea into the plan that had already set out in August 1948 at the Speyer History Symposium, for a new "Institute for European History" to be based in Mainz, with a "Universal History" department which he would head up and a "Religious History" department to be led by Joseph Lortz. In place of the destructive nationalist polemical approach to history that had prevailed across Europe for so long, the idea was to present a universal-historical perspective, grounded in the "Historia Mundi" on which Fritz Kern was already working. The "Institute for European History" was established in 1950. Kern lived long enough to be its founding director, with Lortz serving as co-director. The "Historia Mundi" idea was taken forward by others.

=== Death ===
Fritz Kern died in a Mainz hospital on 21 May 1950.

== Work ==
A focus of Kern's work was the study of the comparative legal and constitutional history in the Medieval period and the universal history of humanity. His major work, "Gottesgnadentum und Widerstandsrecht im früheren Mittelalter" (loosely, "The Grace of God and Rights to Resist in the Early Middle Ages"), published originally in 1914, reset the compass, and remains influential more than a century later. He intended it as a "comparative constitutional history of the Middle Ages" and an investigation of the "interconnections between law and the world vision". The underlying theme of the book is defined by the author in its 1914 introduction as "the relationship between ruler and the people in the creation of government, its implementation and its termination". An English edition, entitled "Kingship and law", followed in 1939. In 1954, after Kern had died, Rudolf Buchner produced a new German edition of the work.

Extremely influential in its day was Kern's substantial essay "Recht und Verfassung im Mittelalter" (loosely, "Law and Constitution") which appeared in 1919, and in which he sought to show how the law derives from that which is "old and good".

His universal historical treatise "Die Anfänge der Weltgeschichte" ("Beginnings of World History") appeared first in 1933. After 1945 Kern comprehensively reworked the text. The book showcases the cultural framework that Kern had by this time developed, whereby he sought to supersede the old historical prisms of bourgeois-liberal evolutionism together with biologically derived social darwinism. It was perhaps a reflection of the work's vast ambitions that only the first part was completed. It presents "a guide to the centuries and millennia of base culture" and was published posthumously in 1953. By the early 1960s Fritz Kern's intensively forensic approach to sources had fallen out of fashion, while his interpretations, which a generation earlier might have been deemed merely "conservative-traditionalist", were being critiqued, if at all, merely as "old-fashioned".

Kern's earlier published work, setting out a curiously deterministic vision of the expansion, during the early and middle medieval periods, of what later became the highly centralised French state, became a standard work and has in some ways retained the respect of subsequent scholars more effectively than some of his more recent and more ambitiously scoped works. For German scholars there is an obvious contrast to be drawn with the success of the decentralised evolution of the Holy Roman Empire and its successors. Nevertheless, the patterns identified by Kern also attract dissent. In 2009 Jean-Marie Moeglin wrote an essay in which he evaluated and dismissed as "myth" Kern's thesis of a French "expansionist policy" during the medieval period at the expense of "the empire".

== Personal ==
In 1909 Fritz Kern became engaged to and then married Bertha, the sixth recorded child and youngest daughter of the recently deceased philosopher Eduard von Hartmann (1842–1906). The marriage would be followed in due course by the births of two daughters, ____ and Gisela, along with one son, Berthold.

Fritz Kern's first marriage ended in divorce in 1941. Later that same year he married Elisabeth Charlotte Ahrens (1904 - ), the daughter of Dr. Reinhold Ahrens, a health official from Remscheid. The marriage was followed by the birth of the couple's son, Fritz Kern's fourth recorded child and second son.

== Published output (selection) ==
- Dorsualkonzept und Imbreviatur. Zur Geschichte der Notariatsurkunde in Italien, doctoral dissertation, Berlin 1906.
- Die Anfänge der französischen Ausdehnungspolitik bis zum Jahr 1308. Mohr, Tübingen 1910.
- als Herausgeber: Acta Imperii Angliae et Franciae ab anno 1267 ad annum 1313. Dokumente vornehmlich zur Geschichte der auswärtigen Beziehungen Deutschlands. Mohr, Tübingen 1911 (reprinted. Olms, Hildesheim and others 1973, ISBN 3-487-04916-3).
- Gottesgnadentum und Widerstandsrecht im früheren Mittelalter. Zur Entwicklungsgeschichte der Monarchie (= Mittelalterliche Studien. vol. 1, H. 2, ZDB-ID 513361-0). Koehler, Leipzig 1914 (7th edition, unchanged reprint of the 2nd edition of 1954. Produced by Rudolf Buchner. Wissenschaftliche Buchgesellschaft, Darmstadt 1980, ISBN 3-534-00129-X).
- Dante. 4 Vorträge zur Einführung in die Göttliche Komödie. Mohr, Tübingen 1914.
- Humana civilitas (Staat, Kirche und Kultur). Eine Dante-Untersuchung (= Mittelalterliche Studien. vol. 1, section 1). Koehler, Leipzig 1913.
- Recht und Verfassung im Mittelalter. In: Historische Zeitschrift. vol. 120, 1919, pp. 1–79, doi:10.1524/hzhz.1919.120.jg.1, (Special rerelease of the 1952 edition. Books on Demand, Norderstedt 2008, ISBN 978-3-534-20883-8).
- Stammbaum und Artbild der Deutschen und ihrer Verwandten. Ein kultur- und rassengeschichtlicher Versuch. Lehmann, München 1927.
- Die Anfänge der Weltgeschichte. Ein Forschungsbericht und Leitfaden. Teubner, Leipzig u. a. 1933.
- Geschichte und Entwicklung (Evolution). Aus dem Nachlass herausgegeben von Liselotte Kern. Francke, Bern 1952.
