= Fritz Schmidt (Nazi official) =

Nazi administrator

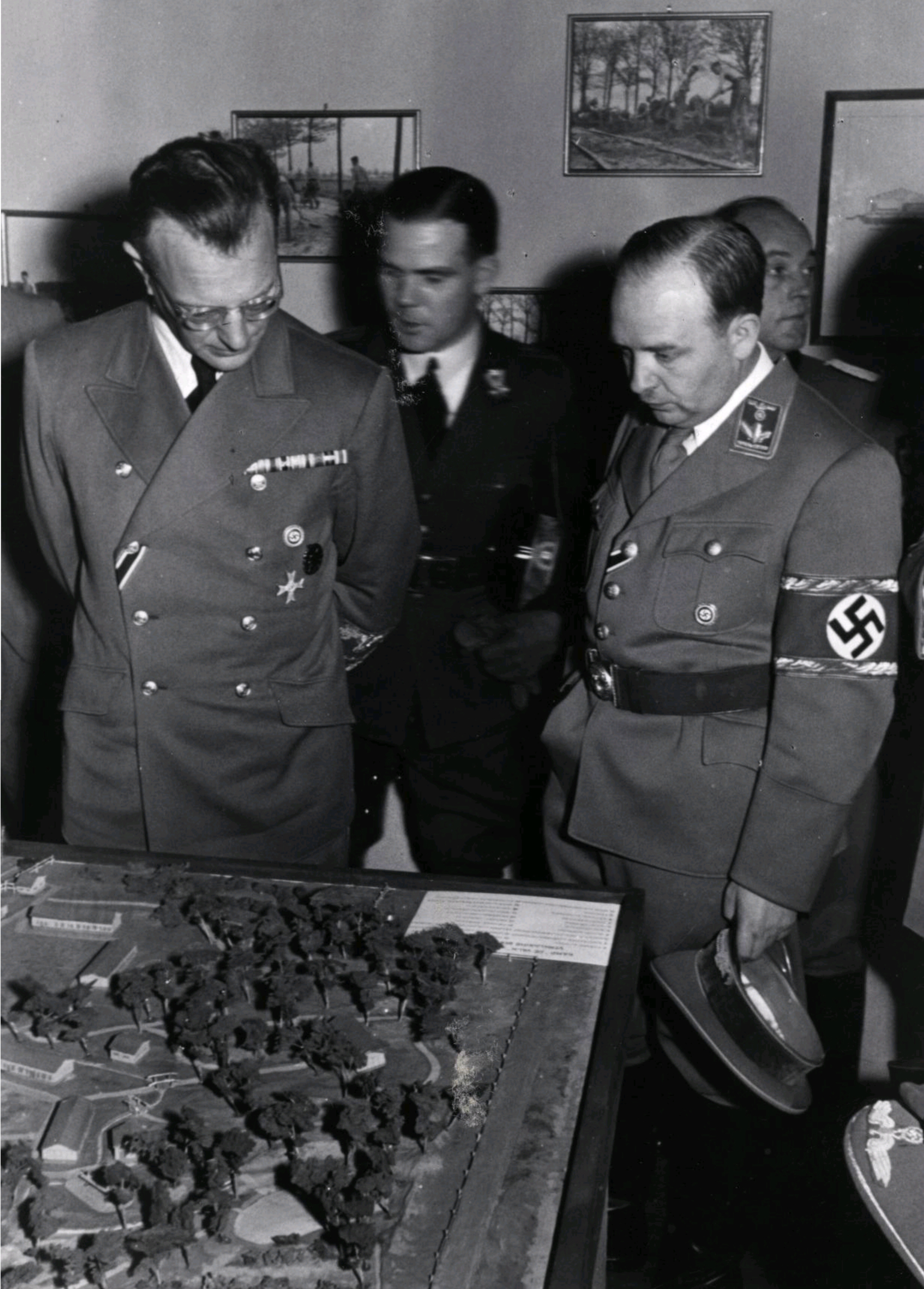
Arthur Seyß-Inquart & Fritz Schmidt (1941)

Fritz Schmidt (19 November 1903 in Eisbergen, nowadays part of Porta Westfalica, Westphalia – 26 June 1943 in Chartres) was the German Commissioner-General for Political Affairs and Propaganda in the occupied Netherlands between 1940 and 1943, one of four assistants to the Governor-General, Arthur Seyss-Inquart.

He is regarded as a compromiser and promoted the interests of Anton Mussert and the Nationaal-Socialistische Beweging (NSB).

In March 1936, Schmidt was elected to the Reichstag for electoral constituency 17 (Westphalia North). He was reelected in April 1938 and remained a member until his death.

Schmidt died at the age of 39 on 26 June 1943 when he "fell, jumped, or was pushed out of a train", and was succeeded by Wilhelm Ritterbusch.
