= Torgau-Oschatz =

Coordinates: 51°33′36″N 13°00′36″E

- District
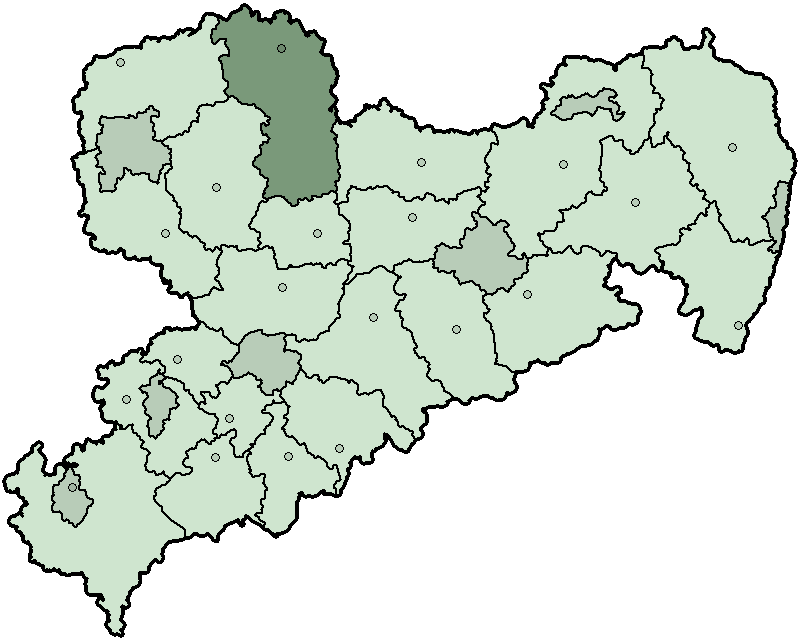
- Country: Germany
- State: Saxony
- Adm. region: Leipzig
- Disbanded: 2008-08-01
- Capital: Torgau

Area
  - Total: 1,167.52 km^{2} (450.78 sq mi)

Population (2001)
  - Total: 100,485
  - Density: 86/km^{2} (220/sq mi)
- Time zone: UTC+01:00 (CET)
  - Summer (DST): UTC+02:00 (CEST)
- Vehicle registration: TO
- Website: www.torgau-oschatz.de

Torgau-Oschatz is a former district (Kreis) in Saxony, Germany. It was bounded by (from the north and clockwise) the district Wittenberg in Saxony-Anhalt, the district Elbe-Elster in Brandenburg, and the districts Riesa-Großenhain, Döbeln, Muldentalkreis and Delitzsch.

== History ==
The district was created in 1994 by merging the two previous districts Oschatz and Torgau, and 6 municipalities from the former district Eilenburg. In August 2008, as a part of the district reform in Saxony, the districts of Delitzsch and Torgau-Oschatz were merged into the new district Nordsachsen.

== Geography ==
The main river in the district is the Elbe, which meanders through water meadows. The landscape is dominated by three heath areas, the Dahlener Heide (150 km^{2}) in the south, the Düben Heath (110 km^{2}) in the northwest, and partially the Annaburger Heide in the east.

== Coat of arms ==
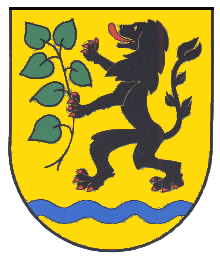
The main symbol in the coat of arms is the lion of Meißen, as the area of the district belonged to the county of Meißen historically. The lion holds a linden branch, symbolizing both the forests and the agriculture in the district. The wavy line in the bottom is the Elbe river.

The coat of arms were granted on January 12, 1996.

== Towns and municipalities ==
Towns
1. Belgern
2. Dahlen
3. Dommitzsch¹
4. Mügeln
5. Oschatz
6. Schildau
7. Torgau¹

¹ Administrated in a
Verwaltungsgemeinschaft

Verwaltungsgemeinschaften
1. Beilrode
  1. Arzberg
  2. Beilrode
  3. Großtreben-Zwethau
2. Dommitzsch
  1. Dommitzsch
  2. Elsnig
  3. Trossin
3. Torgau
  1. Torgau
  2. Dreiheide
  3. Pflückuff
  4. Zinna
free municipalities
1. Cavertitz
2. Liebschützberg
3. Mockrehna
4. Naundorf
5. Sornzig-Ablaß
6. Wermsdorf
