= List of cities in Saxony by population =

The following list sorts all cities and communes in the German state of Saxony with a population of more than 15,000. As of May 15, 2022, 42 cities fulfill this criterion and are listed here. This list refers only to the population of individual municipalities within their defined limits, which does not include other municipalities or suburban areas within urban agglomerations.

== List ==
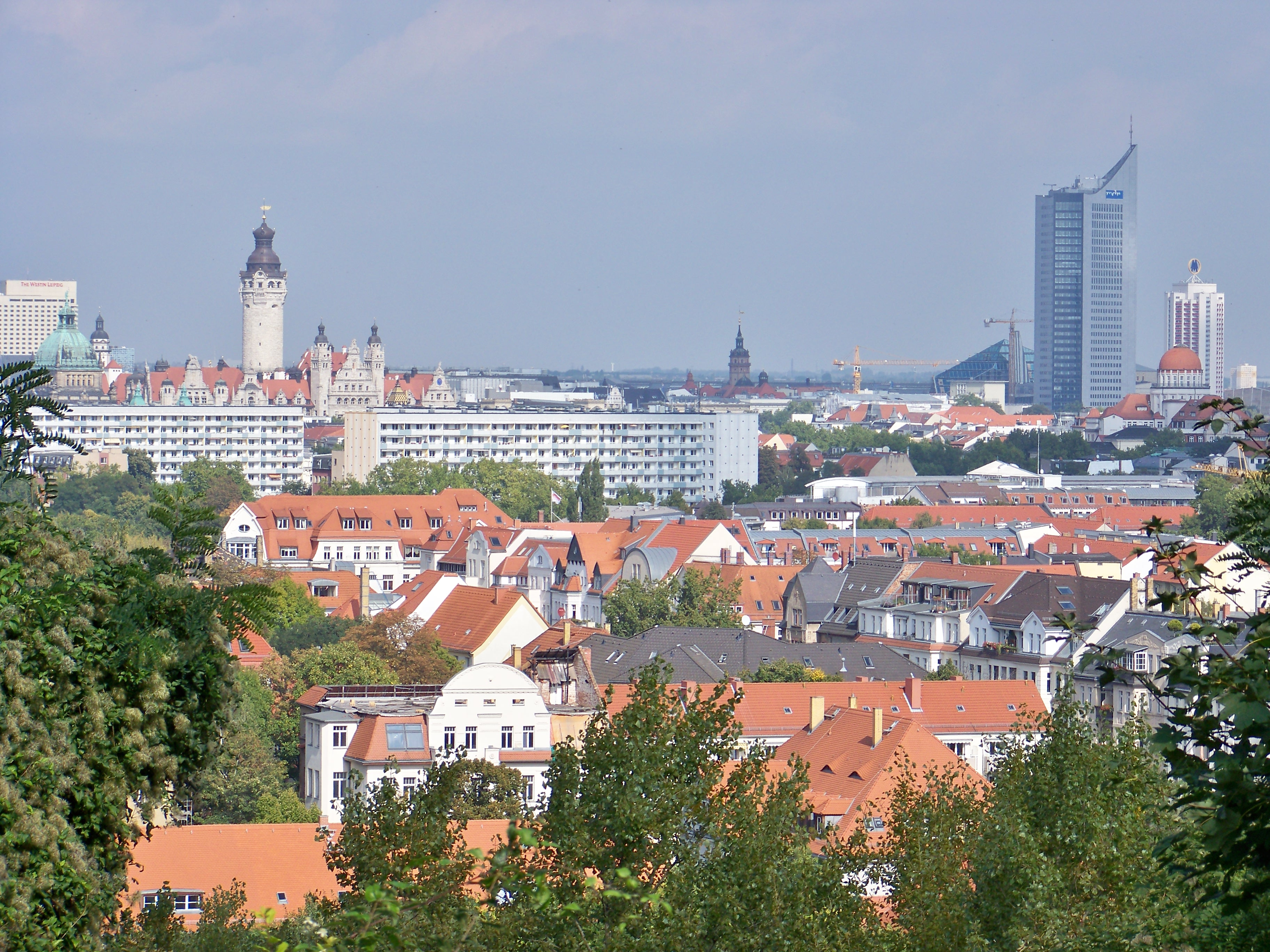
Leipzig

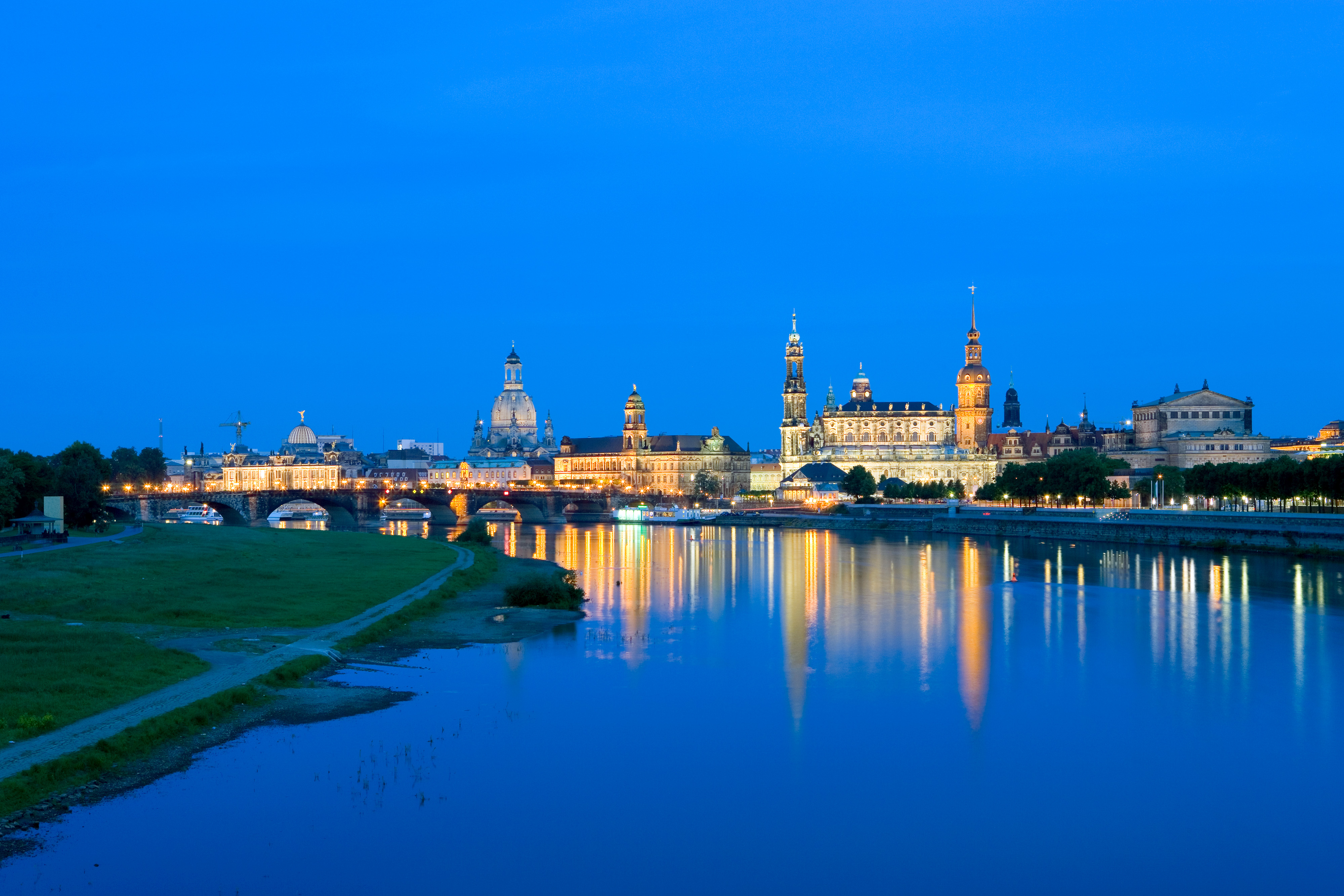
Dresden

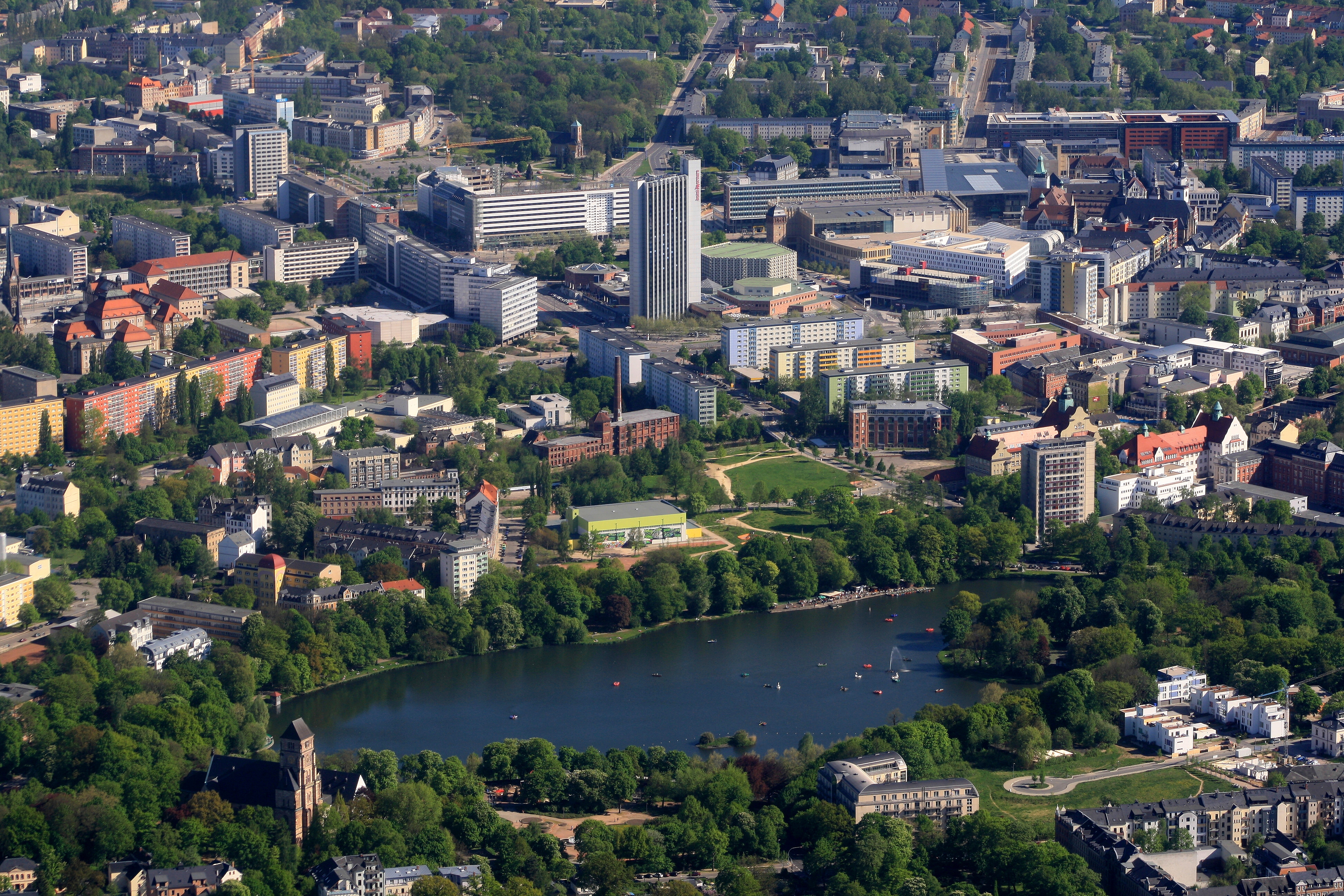
Chemnitz

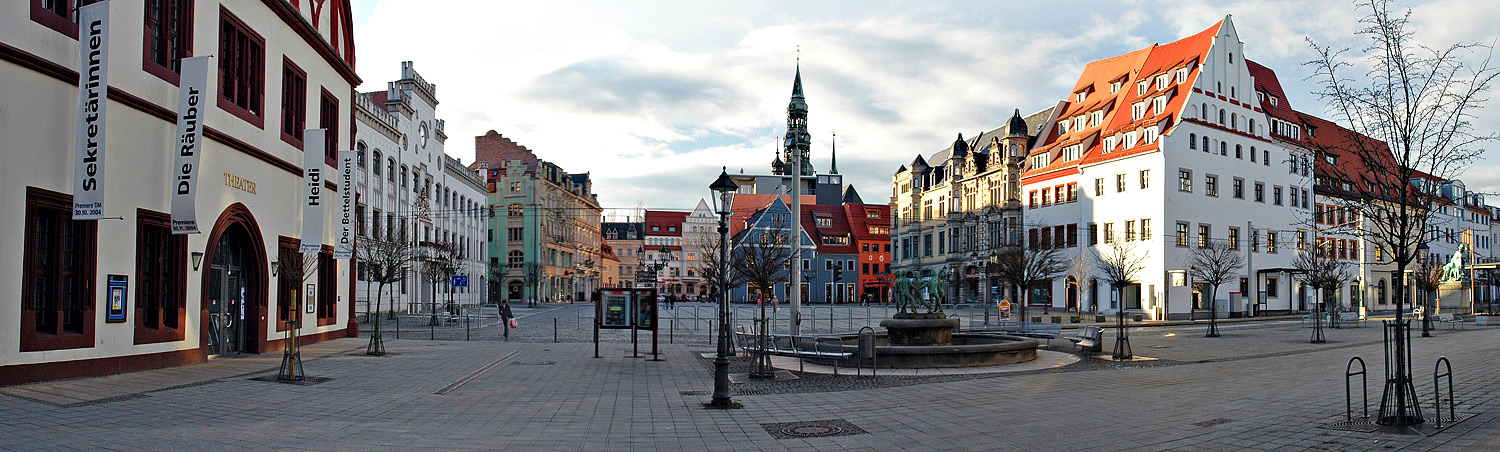
Zwickau

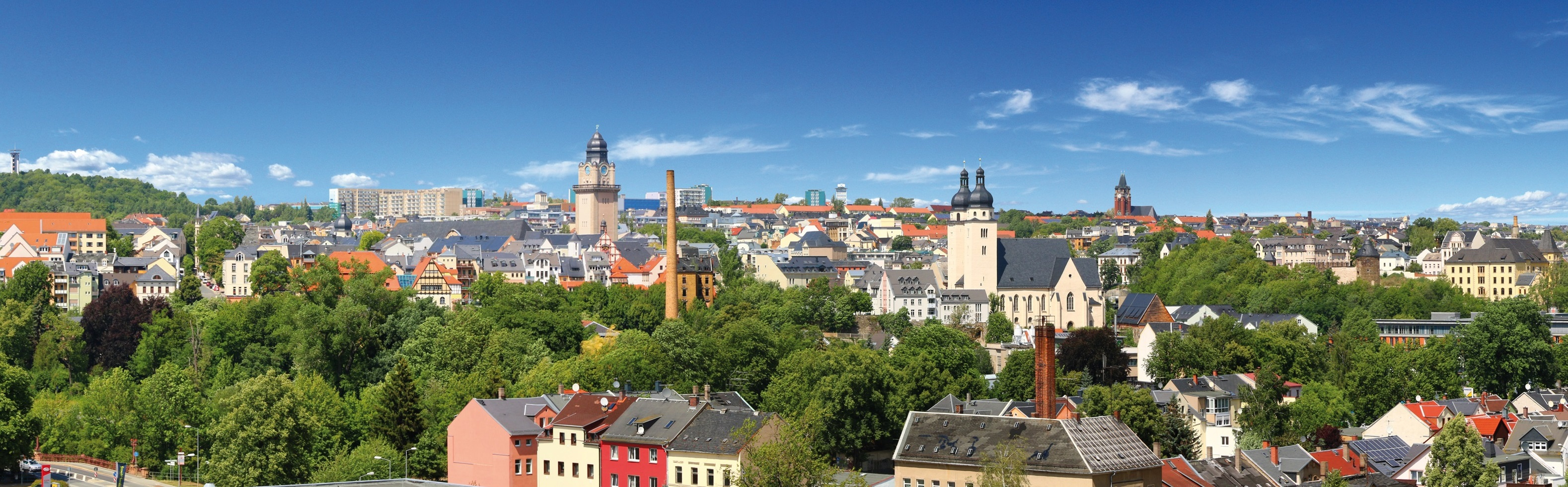
Plauen

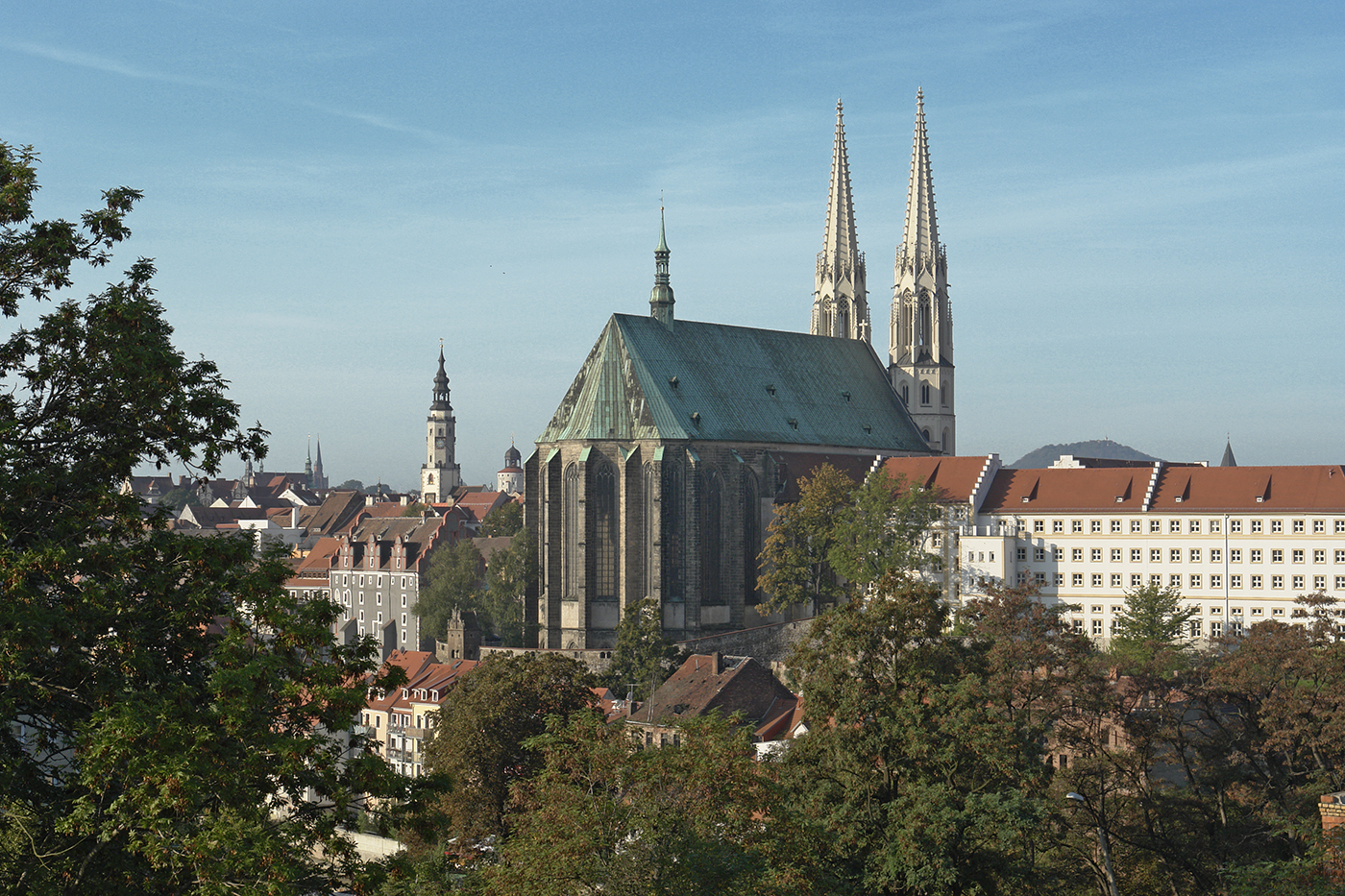
Görlitz

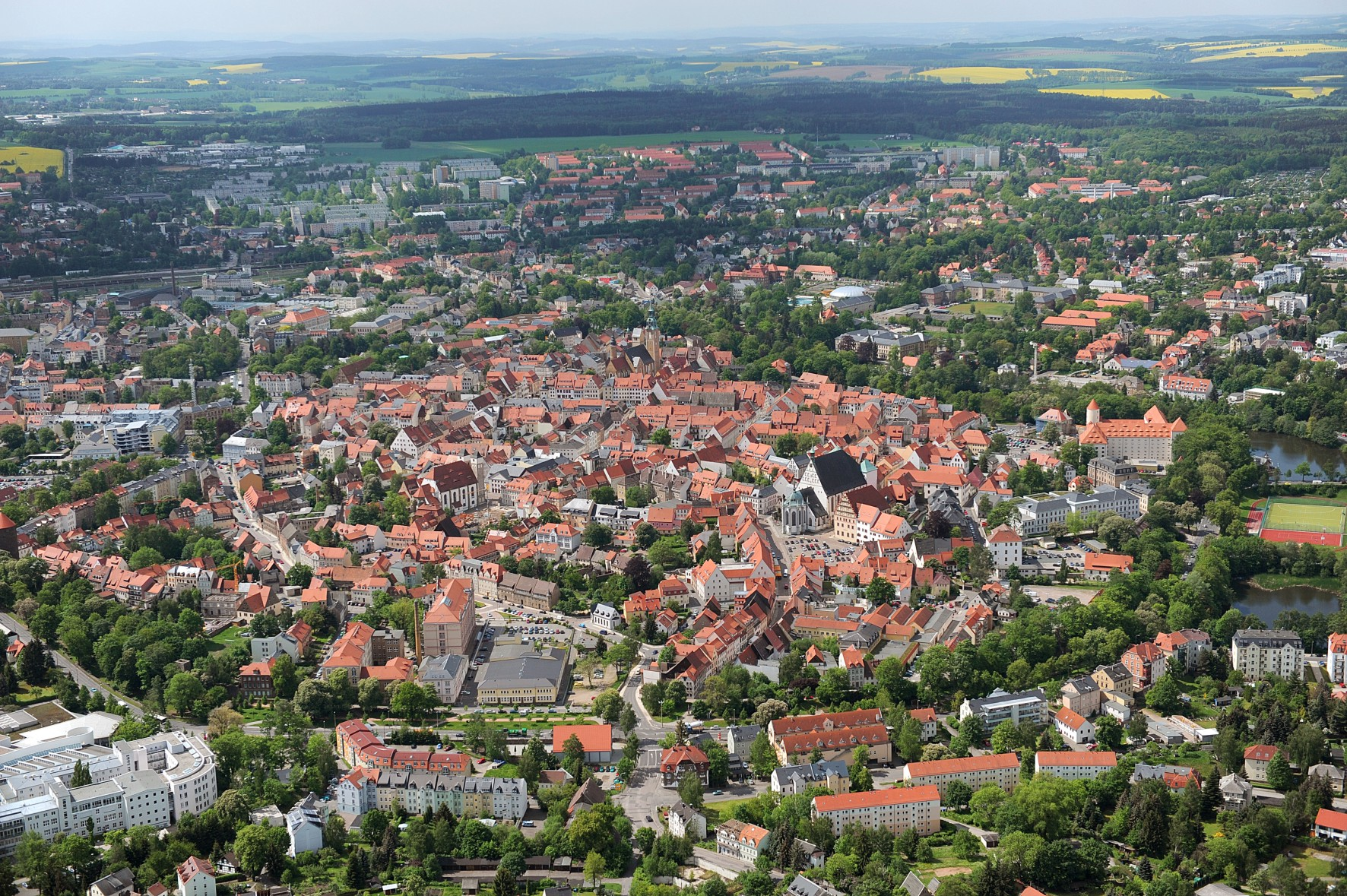
Freiberg

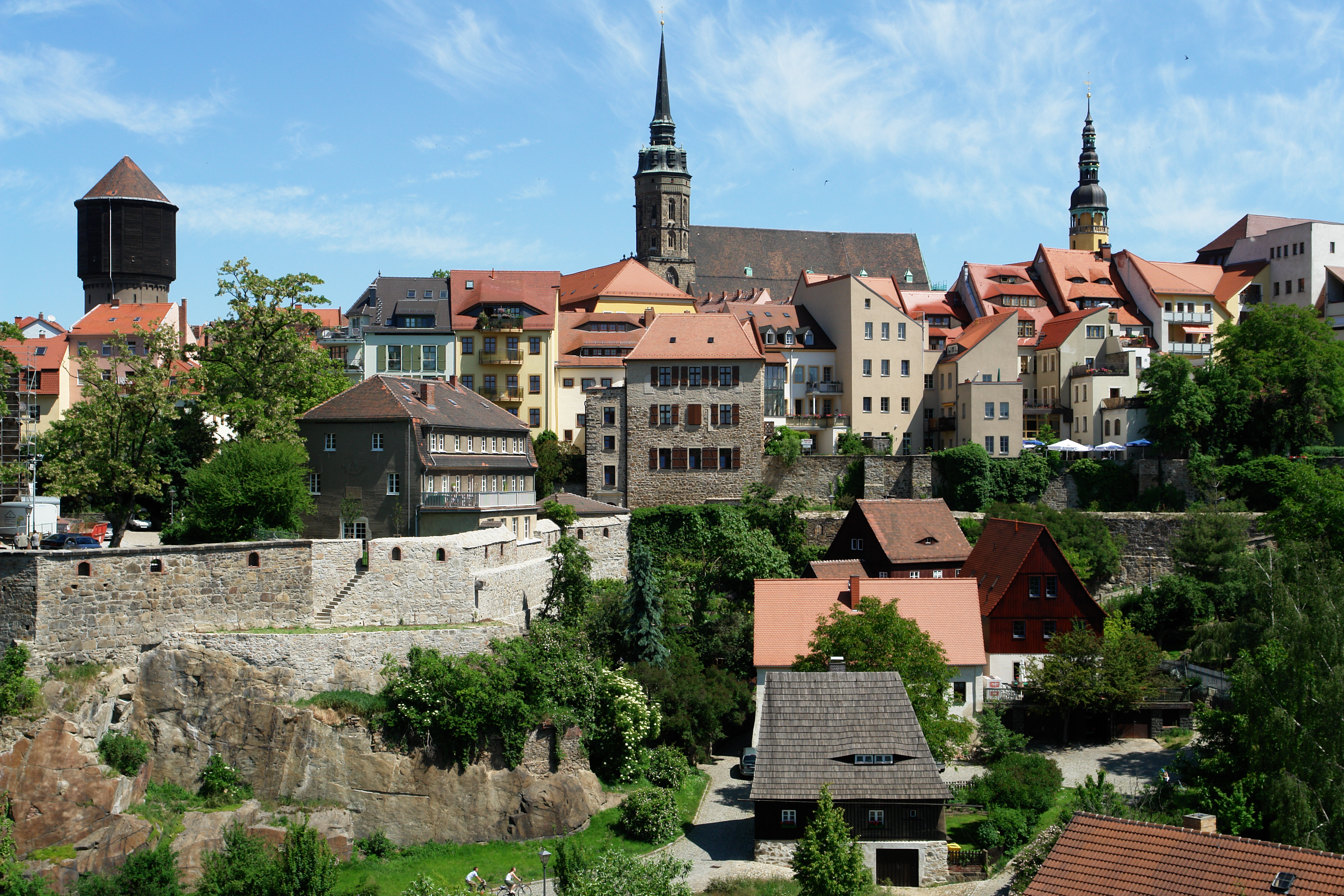
Bautzen

The following table lists the 42 cities and communes in Saxony with a population of at least 25,000 on May 15, 2022, as estimated by the Federal Statistical Office of Germany. A city is displayed in bold if it is a state or federal capital.

1. The city rank by population as of May 15, 2022, as enumerated by the 2022 German Census.
2. The city name
3. The name of the district (Landkreis) in which the city lies (some cities are districts on their own called urban districts)
4. The city population as of May 15, 2022, as enumerated by the 2022 German Census
5. The city population as of May 9, 2011, as enumerated by the 2011 European Union census
6. The city land area as of May 15, 2022
7. The city population density as of May 15, 2022 (residents per unit of land area)

2022 rank	City	District	2022 census	2011 census	2022 land area	2022 pop. density
1	Leipzig	urban district	598,899	502,979	298 km^{2}	2,011/km^{2}
2	**Dresden**	urban district	557,782	512,354	328 km^{2}	1,698/km^{2}
3	Chemnitz	urban district	240,078	240,253	221 km^{2}	1,086/km^{2}
4	Zwickau	Zwickau	87,020	93,081	103 km^{2}	848.3/km^{2}
5	Plauen	Vogtlandkreis	64,674	64,468	102 km^{2}	633.4/km^{2}
6	Görlitz	Görlitz	54,664	54,441	67.5 km^{2}	809.5/km^{2}
7	Freiberg	Mittelsachsen	40,103	39,825	48.3 km^{2}	830.1/km^{2}
8	Pirna	Sächsische Schweiz-Osterzgebirge	39,411	37,451	53.1 km^{2}	742.8/km^{2}
9	Freital	Sächsische Schweiz-Osterzgebirge	39,355	38,388	40.5 km^{2}	972.7/km^{2}
10	Bautzen	Bautzen	38,084	40,273	66.7 km^{2}	571.2/km^{2}
11	Radebeul	Meissen	33,497	33,201	26.1 km^{2}	1,281/km^{2}
12	Hoyerswerda	Bautzen	31,064	36,107	95.5 km^{2}	327.0/km^{2}
13	Riesa	Meissen	29,434	32,539	58.9 km^{2}	499.6/km^{2}
14	Meissen	Meissen	28,487	27,055	30.9 km^{2}	921.3/km^{2}
15	Grimma	Leipzig	27,639	29,271	218 km^{2}	126.7/km^{2}
16	Delitzsch	Delitzsch	25,816	25,361	85.9 km^{2}	300.5/km^{2}
17	Zittau	Görlitz	25,585	26,777	66.8 km^{2}	383.3/km^{2}
18	Markkleeberg	Leipzig	25,581	23,672	31.4 km^{2}	812.6/km^{2}
19	Limbach-Oberfrohna	Zwickau	23,708	24,721	50.2 km^{2}	472.2/km^{2}
20	Döbeln	Döbeln	23,488	24,485	91.7 km^{2}	256.0/km^{2}
21	Glauchau	Zwickau	21,821	23,578	51.6 km^{2}	422.7/km^{2}
22	Werdau	Zwickau	20,668	21,712	65.6 km^{2}	315.0/km^{2}
23	Coswig	Meissen	20,369	20,689	25.9 km^{2}	787.1/km^{2}
24	Torgau	Torgau-Oschatz	20,096	20,700	103 km^{2}	195.4/km^{2}
25	Reichenbach im Vogtland	Vogtlandkreis	20,001	22,399	34.5 km^{2}	580.2/km^{2}
26	Aue-Bad Schlema	Erzgebirgskreis	19,278	22,038	36.4 km^{2}	529.2/km^{2}
27	Schkeuditz	Nordsachsen	19,003	16,922	81.5 km^{2}	233.3/km^{2}
28	Borna	Leipzig	18,998	19,784	62.4 km^{2}	304.2/km^{2}
29	Annaberg-Buchholz	Erzgebirgskreis	18,942	21,105	28.1 km^{2}	672.9/km^{2}
30	Radeberg	Bautzen	18,724	18,039	29.8 km^{2}	627.7/km^{2}
31	Crimmitschau	Zwickau	18,718	20,078	61.1 km^{2}	306.1/km^{2}
32	Großenhain	Meissen	18,300	18,797	130 km^{2}	140.4/km^{2}
33	Auerbach (Vogtland)	Vogtlandkreis	17,732	19,604	55.5 km^{2}	319.4/km^{2}
34	Kamenz	Bautzen	17,282	17,808	98.3 km^{2}	175.8/km^{2}
35	Heidenau	Sächsische Schweiz-Osterzgebirge	16,753	15,953	11.1 km^{2}	1,513/km^{2}
36	Marienberg	Erzgebirgskreis	16,439	18,033	134 km^{2}	123.1/km^{2}
37	Markranstädt	Leipzig	16,182	14,763	58.5 km^{2}	276.8/km^{2}
38	Eilenburg	Nordsachsen	16,155	15,794	46.8 km^{2}	344.9/km^{2}
39	Taucha	Nordsachsen	15,978	14,128	33.2 km^{2}	481.0/km^{2}
40	Schwarzenberg	Erzgebirgskreis	15,917	18,109	46.3 km^{2}	343.7/km^{2}
41	Wurzen	Leipzig	15,902	16,928	69.0 km^{2}	230.5/km^{2}
42	Weißwasser	Görlitz	15,348	18,175	63.4 km^{2}	242.0/km^{2}
