= Nordsachsen 2 =

State electoral district of Germany

34: Nordsachsen 2
- Electoral district for the Landtag of Saxony
- Nordsachsen 2 in 2024
- District: Nordsachsen
- Electorate: 50,759 (2024)
- Major settlements: Bad Düben, Dommitzsch, Eilenburg, and Taucha

Current electoral district
- Party: AfD
- Member: Ferdinand Wiedeburg

Nordsachsen 2 is an electoral constituency (German: Wahlkreis) represented in the Landtag of Saxony. It elects one member via first-past-the-post voting. Under the constituency numbering system, it is designated as constituency 34. It is within the district of Nordsachsen.

== Geography ==
The constituency comprises the towns of Bad Düben, Dommitzsch, Eilenburg, and Taucha, and the municipalities of Doberschütz, Elsnig, Jesewitz, Laußig, Mockrehna, Trossin, and Zschepplin within the district of Nordsachsen.

There were 50,759 eligible voters in 2024.

== Members ==
Election	Member	Party	%
2014	Jörg Kiesewetter	CDU	45.1
2019	Sebastien Gemkow	CDU	34.3
2024	Ferdinand Wiedeburg	AfD	39.6

== Election results ==
=== 2024 election ===
State election (2024): Nordsachsen 1
Notes:	Blue background denotes the winner of the electorate vote. Pink background denotes a candidate elected from their party list. Yellow background denotes an electorate win by a list member, or other incumbent. A ✓ or ✗ denotes status of any incumbent, win or lose respectively.						
Party	Candidate	Votes	%	±%	Party votes	%	±%
AfD	Ferdinand Wiedeburg	14,351	39.6	▲8.9	12,815	35.3	▲5.3
CDU	✗ Sebastian Gemkow	14,034	38.7	▲4.4	11,622	32.0	▼1.5
BSW					4,499	12.4	
SPD	Stefan Lange	2,472	6.8	▼1.2	2,559	7.0	▼1.2
FW	Chris Daiser	2,318	6.4	▼0.3	955	2.6	▼1.2
Left	Luise Nehaus-Wartenberg	1,568	4.3	▼5.5	873	2.4	▼6.5
Greens	Christine Rademacher	807	2.2	▼3.4	866	2.4	▼3.4
Freie Sachsen					727	2.0	
FDP	Paul Deuschle	712	2.0	▼3.0	382	1.1	▼3.4
APT					346	1.0	
PARTEI					224	0.6	▼0.3
BD					127	0.3	
Values					82	0.2	
Pirates					71	0.2	
dieBasis					54	0.1	
V-Partei3					47	0.1	
BüSo					26	0.1	
Bündnis C					23	0.1	
ÖDP					20	0.1	
Informal votes		491			435		
Total valid votes		36,262			36,318		
Turnout		36,753	72.4	▲13.9			
AfD gain from CDU	Majority	317	0.9				

=== 2019 election ===
State election (2019): Nordsachsen 2
Notes:	Blue background denotes the winner of the electorate vote. Pink background denotes a candidate elected from their party list. Yellow background denotes an electorate win by a list member, or other incumbent. A ✓ or ✗ denotes status of any incumbent, win or lose respectively.						
Party	Candidate	Votes	%	±%	Party votes	%	±%
CDU	Sebastian Gemkow	10,901	34.3	▼10.7	10,676	33.5	▼10.9
AfD	René Bochmann	9,750	30.6		9,571	30.0	▲21.9
Left	Luise Neuhaus-Wartenberg	3,112	9.8	▼11.7	2,844	8.9	▼9.9
SPD	Mathias Teuber	2,551	8.0	▼7.1	2,629	8.2	▼4.2
FW	Birgit Rabe	2,142	6.7		1,219	3.8	▲2.7
Greens	Enrico Kunze	1,795	5.6	▲0.9	1,847	5.8	▲2.0
FDP	Stefan Schieritz	1,573	4.9	▲0.7	1,432	4.5	▲1.0
APT					465	1.5	▲0.5
PARTEI					282	0.9	▲0.6
NPD					273	0.9	▼4.3
Verjüngungsforschung					205	0.6	
The Blue Party					144	0.5	
Pirates					79	0.2	▼0.7
Awakening of German Patriots - Central Germany					60	0.2	
ÖDP					48	0.2	
Humanists					43	0.1	
PDV					30	0.1	
DKP					28	0.1	
BüSo					17	0.1	Steady
Informal votes		436			368		
Total valid votes		31,825			31,892		
Turnout		32,260	62.3	▲16.8			
CDU hold	Majority	1,151	3.7	▼19.8			

=== 2014 election ===
State election (2014): Nordsachsen 2
Notes:	Blue background denotes the winner of the electorate vote. Pink background denotes a candidate elected from their party list. Yellow background denotes an electorate win by a list member, or other incumbent. A ✓ or ✗ denotes status of any incumbent, win or lose respectively.						
Party	Candidate	Votes	%	±%	Party votes	%	±%
CDU	Jörg Kiesewetter	10,525	45.0		10,442	44.4	
Left		5,022	21.5		4,421	18.8	
SPD		3,519	15.1		2,920	12.4	
AfD					1,900	8.1	
NPD		1,500	6.4		1,211	5.2	
Greens		1,095	4.7		896	3.8	
FDP		989	4.2		824	3.5	
FW					262	1.1	
APT					228	1.0	
Pirates		399	1.7		216	0.9	
Independent	Wagner	316	1.4				
PARTEI					67	0.3	
DSU					44	0.2	
Pro Germany Citizens' Movement					43	0.2	
BüSo					20	0.1	
Informal votes		569			440		
Total valid votes		23,365			23,494		
Turnout		23,934	45.5	▼11.5			
CDU win new seat	Majority	5,503	23.5				

== See also ==
- Politics of Saxony
- Landtag of Saxony
