= Delitzsch (district) =

- District
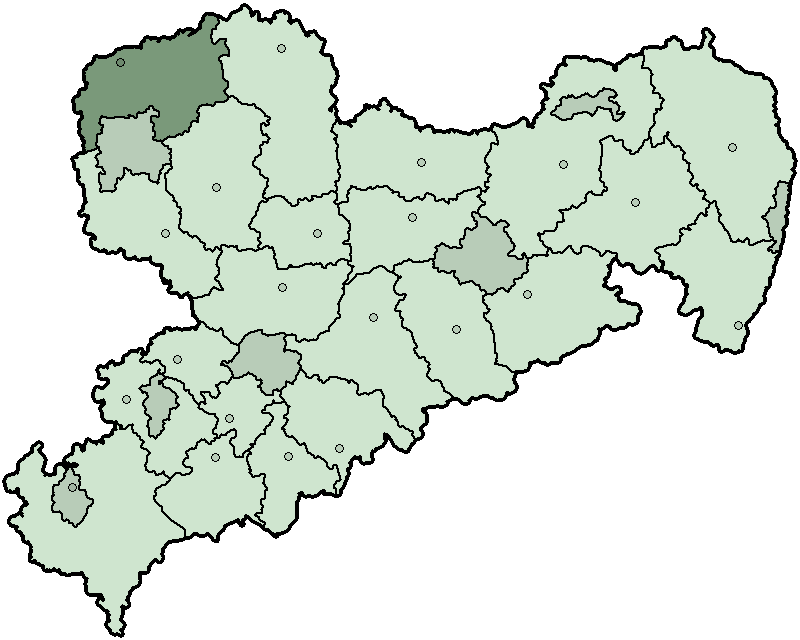
- Coordinates: 51°31′48″N 12°20′24″E
- Country: Germany
- State: Saxony
- Adm. region: Leipzig
- Disbanded: 2008-08-01
- Capital: Delitzsch

Area
  - Total: 852 km^{2} (329 sq mi)

Population (2000)
  - Total: 129,100
  - Density: 150/km^{2} (390/sq mi)
- Time zone: UTC+01:00 (CET)
  - Summer (DST): UTC+02:00 (CEST)
- Vehicle registration: DZ
- Website: www.lradelitzsch.de

Delitzsch (German pronunciation: [ˈdeːlɪtʃ]) is a former district in Saxony, Germany. It was bounded by (from the east and clockwise) the districts of Torgau-Oschatz and Muldentalkreis, the city of Leipzig, the district of Leipziger Land and the state of Saxony-Anhalt (districts Saalekreis, Anhalt-Bitterfeld and Wittenberg).

== History ==
After the 1815 Congress of Vienna Saxony had to cede large amounts of its territory to Prussia. The Prussian government established districts in the newly acquired lands, among them the district of Delitzsch.

The state of Prussia was dissolved after the end of the Nazi era, and the new state of Saxony-Anhalt was established, with Delitzsch being a part of it. In 1953 the East German government dissolved the states. They were reestablished after the German reunification in 1990, but Delitzsch and Eilenburg (two districts made up of the former Delitzsch district) were initially given to Saxony instead of Saxony-Anhalt. The two districts again merged in 1994 and formed the present borders.

In August 2008, as a part of the district reform in Saxony, the districts of Delitzsch and Torgau-Oschatz were merged into the new district Nordsachsen.

== Geography ==
The district was located in the triangle between the metropolises of Leipzig, Halle and Bitterfeld. It consists of plain countryside, which is mainly agriculturally used. There is low urbanisation throughout the district. The Mulde River runs through the easternmost part of the district. On the eastern banks there is the Düben Heath (Dübener Heide), a nature park extending from here to the east and to the north.

== Coat of arms ==
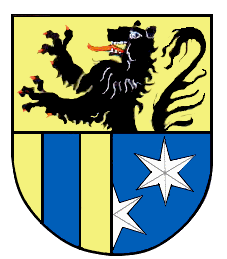
The coat of arms displays:
- the heraldic lion of Saxony
- the stripes are from the arms of Landsberg (now belonging to the Saalkreis district)
- the stars are taken from the arms of Eilenburg

== Towns and municipalities ==
Towns
1. Bad Düben
2. Delitzsch
3. Eilenburg
4. Schkeuditz
5. Taucha
Municipalities
1. Doberschütz
2. Jesewitz
3. Krostitz
4. Laußig
5. Löbnitz
6. Neukyhna

7. Rackwitz
8. Schönwölkau
9. Wiedemar
10. Zschepplin
11. Zwochau
