= Otto Küstner =

German gynecologist (1849-1931)

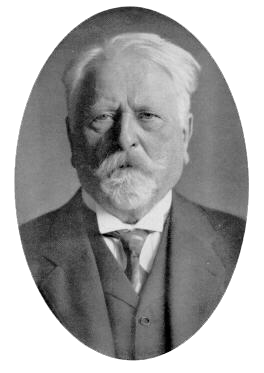
Otto Ernst Küstner (1849-1931)

Otto Ernst Küstner (26 August 1849, Trossin, Province of Saxony – 12 May 1931) was a German gynecologist.

Initially he studied medicine in Leipzig and Berlin, and during the Franco-Prussian War was a volunteer with the Garde-Füsilier-Regiment. Afterwards, he continued his studies at the University of Halle, obtaining his doctorate in 1873. He then furthered his education in Vienna, later returning to Halle as an assistant in the polyclinic of Theodor Weber and also in the obstetrics institute under Robert Michaelis von Olshausen.

In 1877 he received his habilitation, and shortly afterwards became an associate professor at the University of Jena (1879). In 1887 he was appointed professor of obstetrics and gynecology at the Imperial University of Dorpat, and from 1893 until his retirement in 1923 was a professor at the University of Breslau.

Küstner specialized in operative gynecology and situations involving difficult childbirth. There are a number of medical eponyms associated with him, including an obstetrical extraction hook known as "Küstner's Steißhaken". He was the author of a successful textbook on gynecology, titled "Kurzes Lehrbuch der Gynäkologie" (1901, 9th edition 1922).

== Selected written works ==
- Der abdominale Kaiserschnitt (The abdominal Caesarean section), Wiesbaden (1915).
- Kurzes Lehrbuch der Gynäkologie (Short textbook of gynecology), Jena (9th edition 1922).
- Pathologie der Schwangerschaft (Pathology of pregnancy), in: K. Baisel's Textbook of Obstetrics, Volume 2, (1924).
