= Dreiheide =

- Municipality
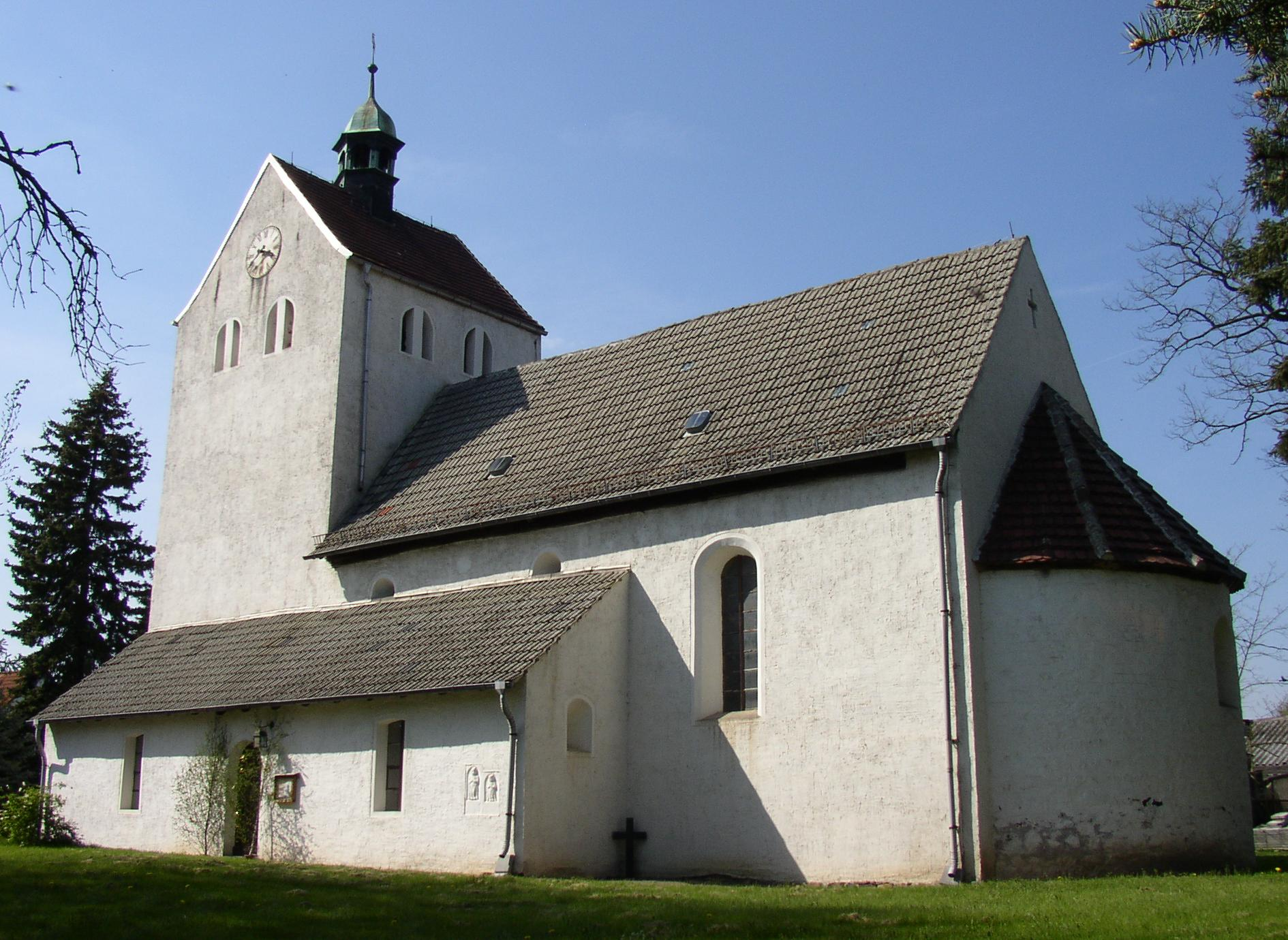
- Church in Weidenhain

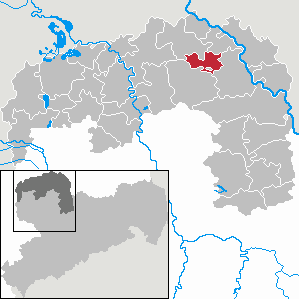
- Location of Dreiheide within Nordsachsen district
- Interactive map of Dreiheide
- Location within Germany Location within Saxony
- Coordinates: 51°33′40″N 12°53′20″E
- Country: Germany
- State: Saxony
- District: Nordsachsen
- Subdivisions: 3

Government
  - Mayor (2020–27): Karsta Niejaki (Independent)

Area
  - Total: 33.53 km^{2} (12.95 sq mi)
- Elevation: 85 m (279 ft)

Population (2025-12-31)
  - Total: 2,039
  - Density: 60.81/km^{2} (157.5/sq mi)
- Time zone: UTC+01:00 (CET)
  - Summer (DST): UTC+02:00 (CEST)
- Postal codes: 04860
- Dialling codes: 03421
- Vehicle registration: TDO, DZ, EB, OZ, TG, TO
- Website: www.dreiheide.de

Dreiheide is a municipality in the district Nordsachsen, in Saxony, Germany.
