= Mockrehna =

- Municipality
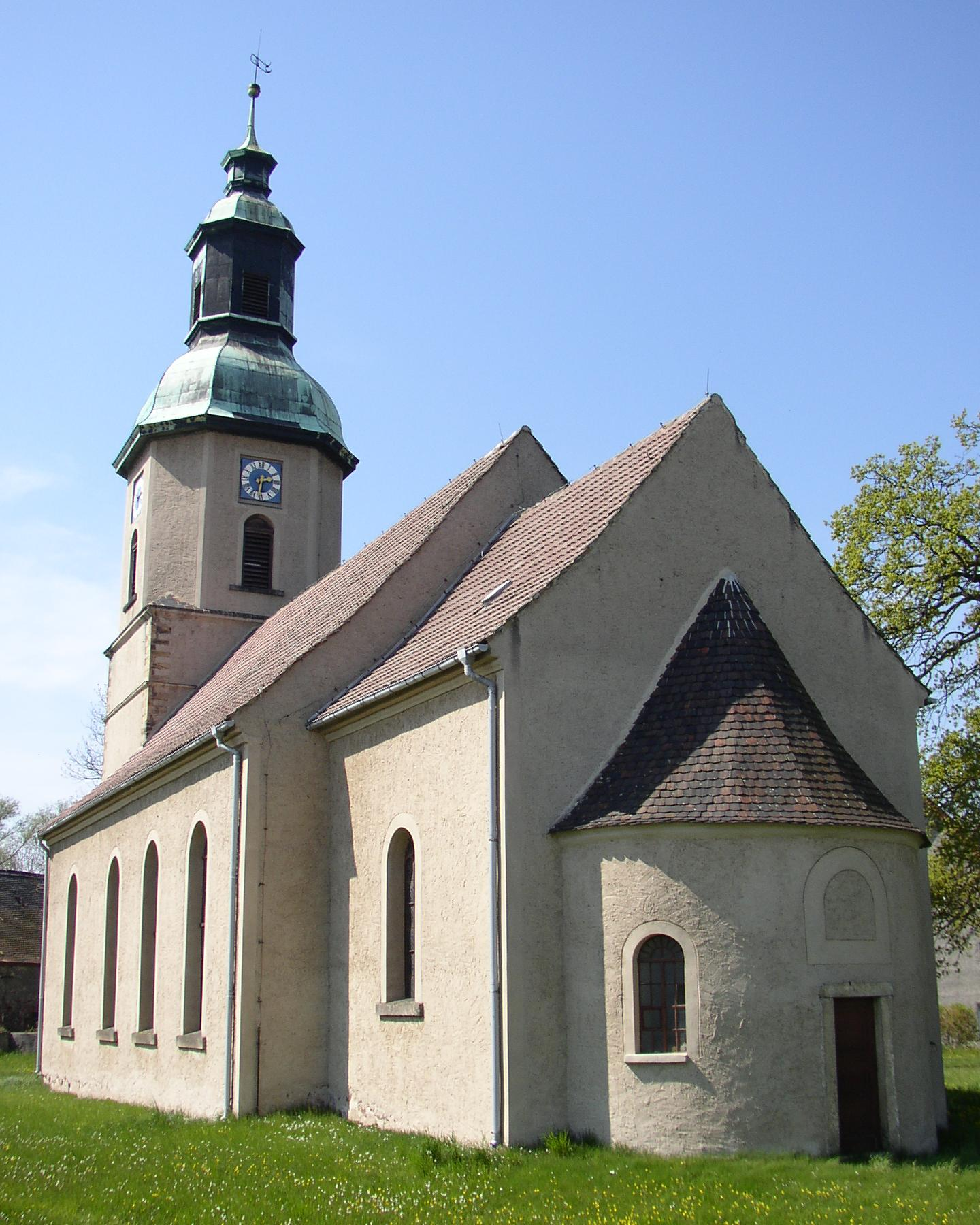
- Church

- Coat of arms

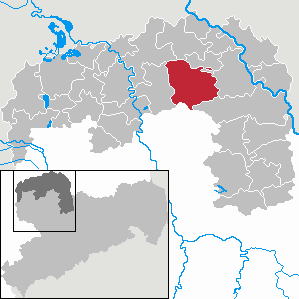
- Location of Mockrehna within Nordsachsen district
- Interactive map of Mockrehna
- Location within Germany Location within Saxony
- Coordinates: 51°30′N 12°48′E
- Country: Germany
- State: Saxony
- District: Nordsachsen
- Subdivisions: 9

Government
  - Mayor (2020–27): Peter Klepel (Independent)

Area
  - Total: 115.18 km^{2} (44.47 sq mi)
- Elevation: 99 m (325 ft)

Population (2025-12-31)
  - Total: 4,847
  - Density: 42.08/km^{2} (109.0/sq mi)
- Time zone: UTC+01:00 (CET)
  - Summer (DST): UTC+02:00 (CEST)
- Postal codes: 04862
- Dialling codes: 034244
- Vehicle registration: TDO, DZ, EB, OZ, TG, TO
- Website: www.mockrehna.de

Mockrehna is a municipality in the district Nordsachsen, in Saxony, Germany.
