= Naundorf, Saxony =

Naundorf
- Municipality
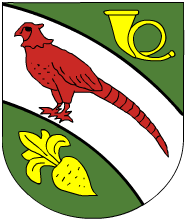
- Coat of arms

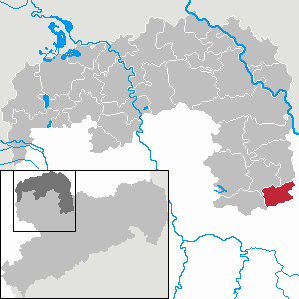
- Location of Naundorf within Nordsachsen district
- Interactive map of Naundorf
- Location within Germany Location within Saxony
- Coordinates: 51°15′N 13°7′E
- Country: Germany
- State: Saxony
- District: Nordsachsen
- Subdivisions: 15

Government
  - Mayor (2019–26): Cathleen Kramm (Independent)

Area
  - Total: 36.89 km^{2} (14.24 sq mi)
- Elevation: 139 m (456 ft)

Population (2025-12-31)
  - Total: 2,148
  - Density: 58.23/km^{2} (150.8/sq mi)
- Time zone: UTC+01:00 (CET)
  - Summer (DST): UTC+02:00 (CEST)
- Postal codes: 04769 04758
- Dialling codes: 03435, 034362 oder 035268
- Vehicle registration: TDO, DZ, EB, OZ, TG, TO
- Website: www.naundorf-sachsen.de

Naundorf is a municipality in the district Nordsachsen, in Saxony, Germany.
