= Laußig =

- Municipality
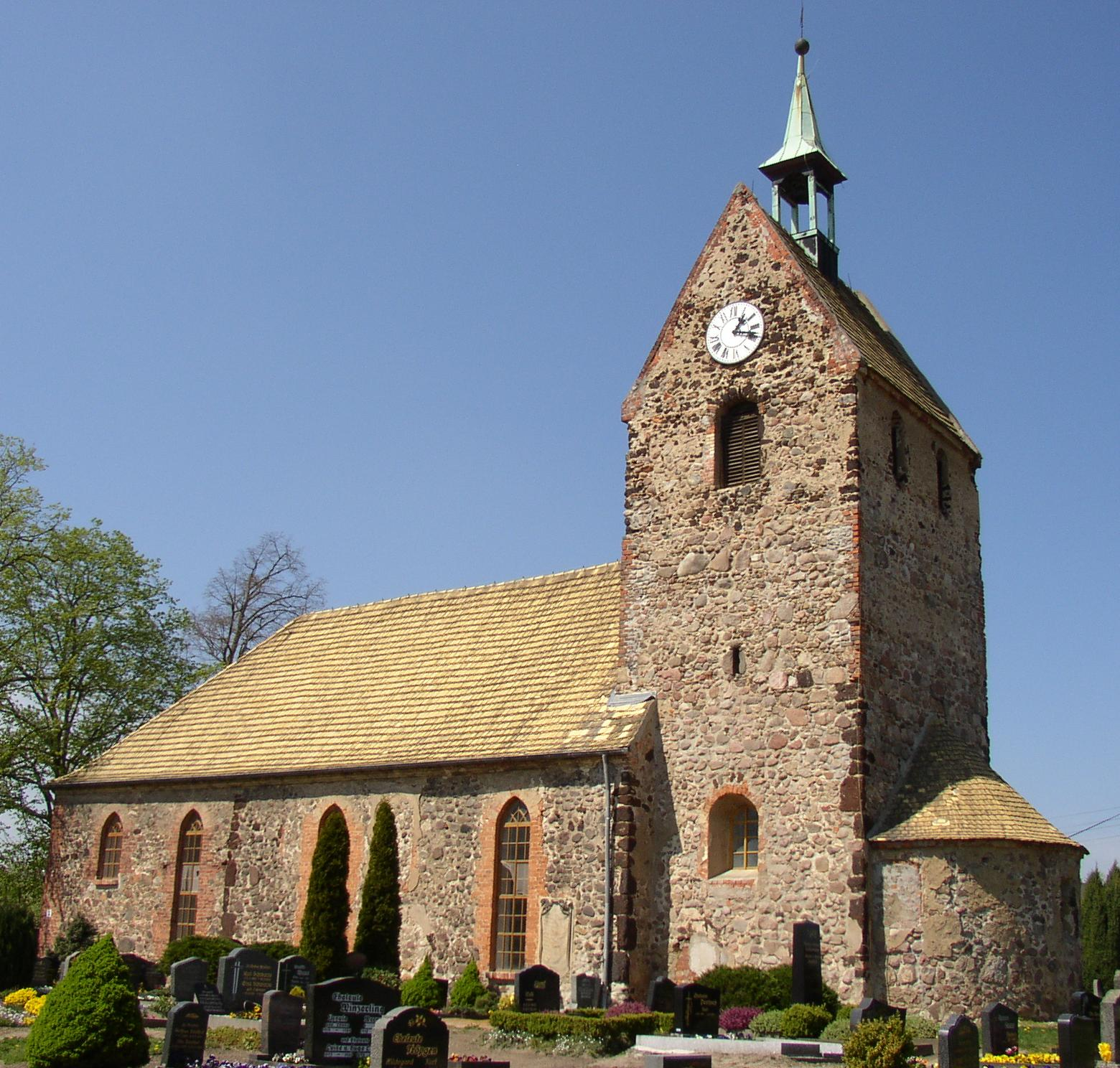
- Church

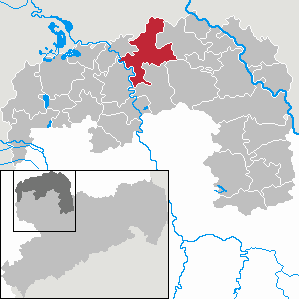
- Location of Laußig within Nordsachsen district
- Interactive map of Laußig
- Location within Germany Location within Saxony
- Coordinates: 51°32′45″N 12°37′50″E
- Country: Germany
- State: Saxony
- District: Nordsachsen
- Subdivisions: 8

Government
  - Mayor (2021–28): Lothar Schneider (Independent)

Area
  - Total: 100.09 km^{2} (38.64 sq mi)
- Elevation: 94 m (308 ft)

Population (2025-12-31)
  - Total: 3,521
  - Density: 35.18/km^{2} (91.11/sq mi)
- Time zone: UTC+01:00 (CET)
  - Summer (DST): UTC+02:00 (CEST)
- Postal codes: 04838
- Dialling codes: 034243
- Vehicle registration: TDO, DZ, EB, OZ, TG, TO
- Website: www.gv-laussig.de

Laußig is a municipality in the district of Nordsachsen, in Saxony, Germany. The seat of the municipality is in Laußig.

== Population ==
Year	Population
2002	2,177
2005	2,060
2010	4,134
2015	3,764
2020	3,620
2021	3,543
2022	3,580
2023	3,680
2024	3,561

The municipality currently includes Laußig and Kossa, which merged in 2007. The jump in population in 2010 reflects the merger.
