= Trossin =

- Municipality
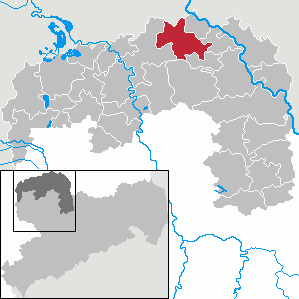
- Location of Trossin within Nordsachsen district
- Interactive map of Trossin
- Location within Germany Location within Saxony
- Coordinates: 51°37′N 12°49′E
- Country: Germany
- State: Saxony
- District: Nordsachsen
- Subdivisions: 8

Government
  - Mayor (2018–25): Herbert Schröder (CDU)

Area
  - Total: 79.59 km^{2} (30.73 sq mi)
- Elevation: 102 m (335 ft)

Population (2025-12-31)
  - Total: 1,159
  - Density: 14.56/km^{2} (37.72/sq mi)
- Time zone: UTC+01:00 (CET)
  - Summer (DST): UTC+02:00 (CEST)
- Postal codes: 04880
- Dialling codes: 034223
- Vehicle registration: TDO, DZ, EB, OZ, TG, TO
- Website: www.gemeinde-trossin.de

Trossin is a municipality in the district Nordsachsen, in Saxony, Germany.

Pictures of the Trossin district Dahlenberg

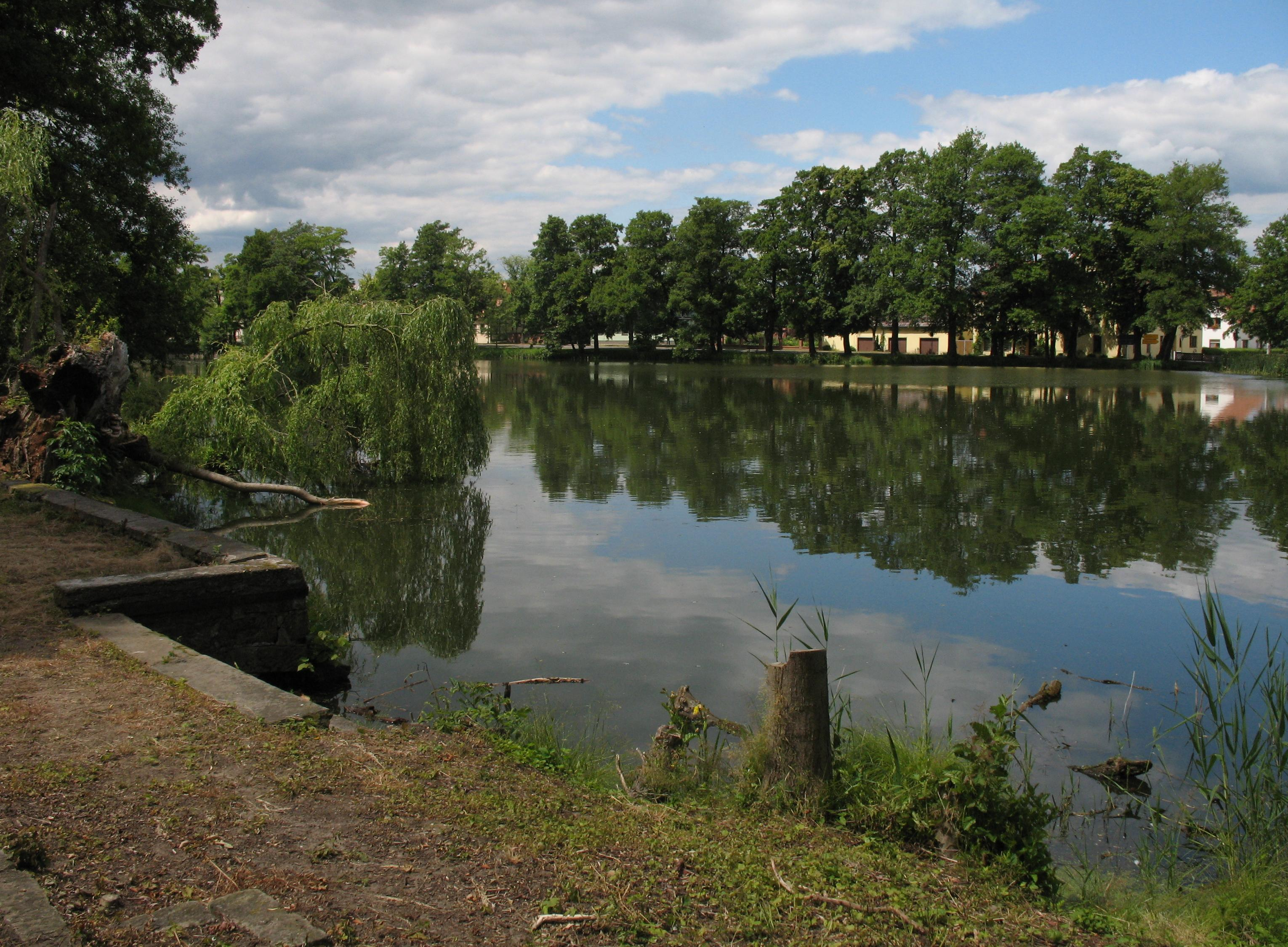
Castle pond

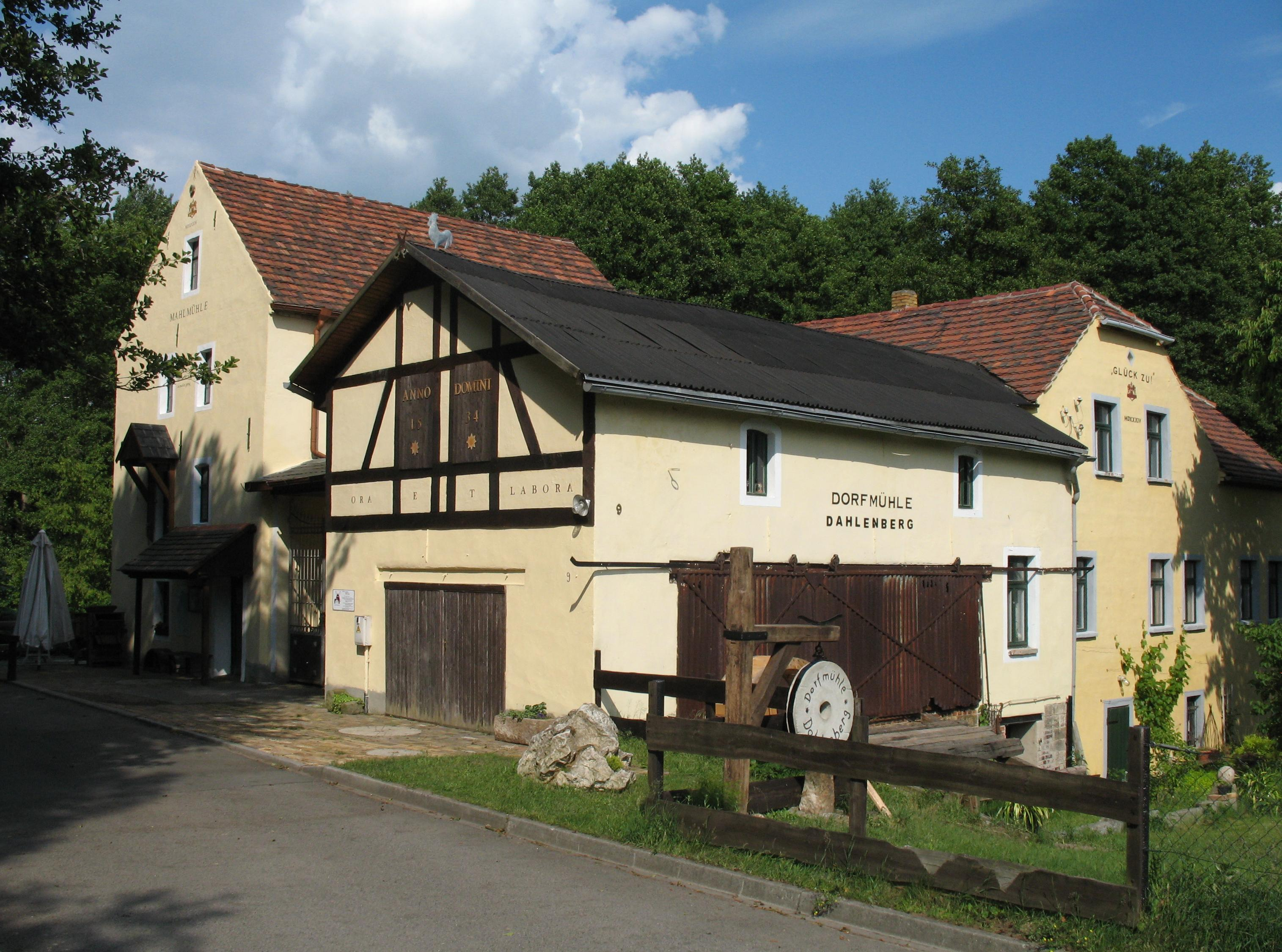
Watermill

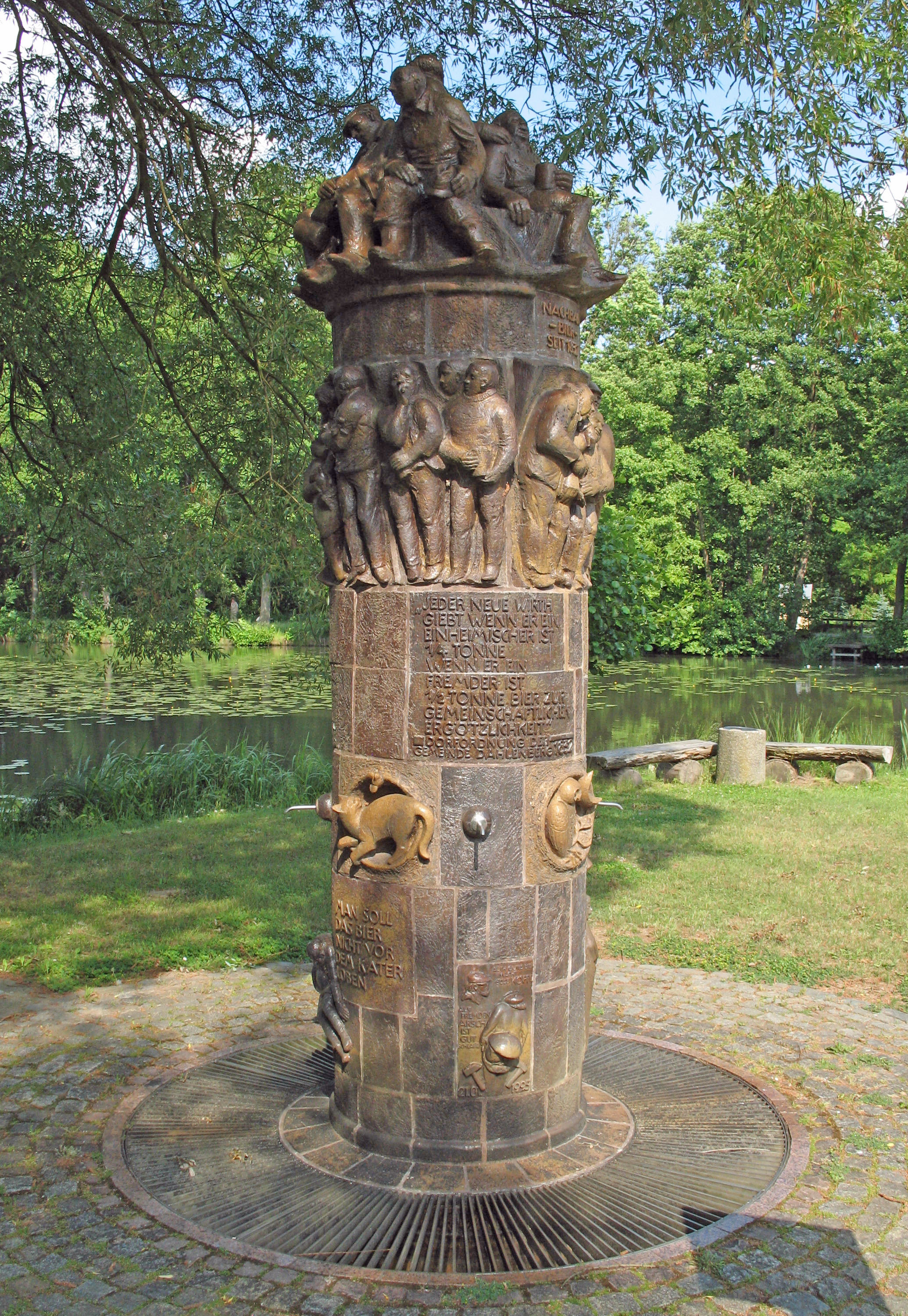
″Neighbour beer″ Fountain

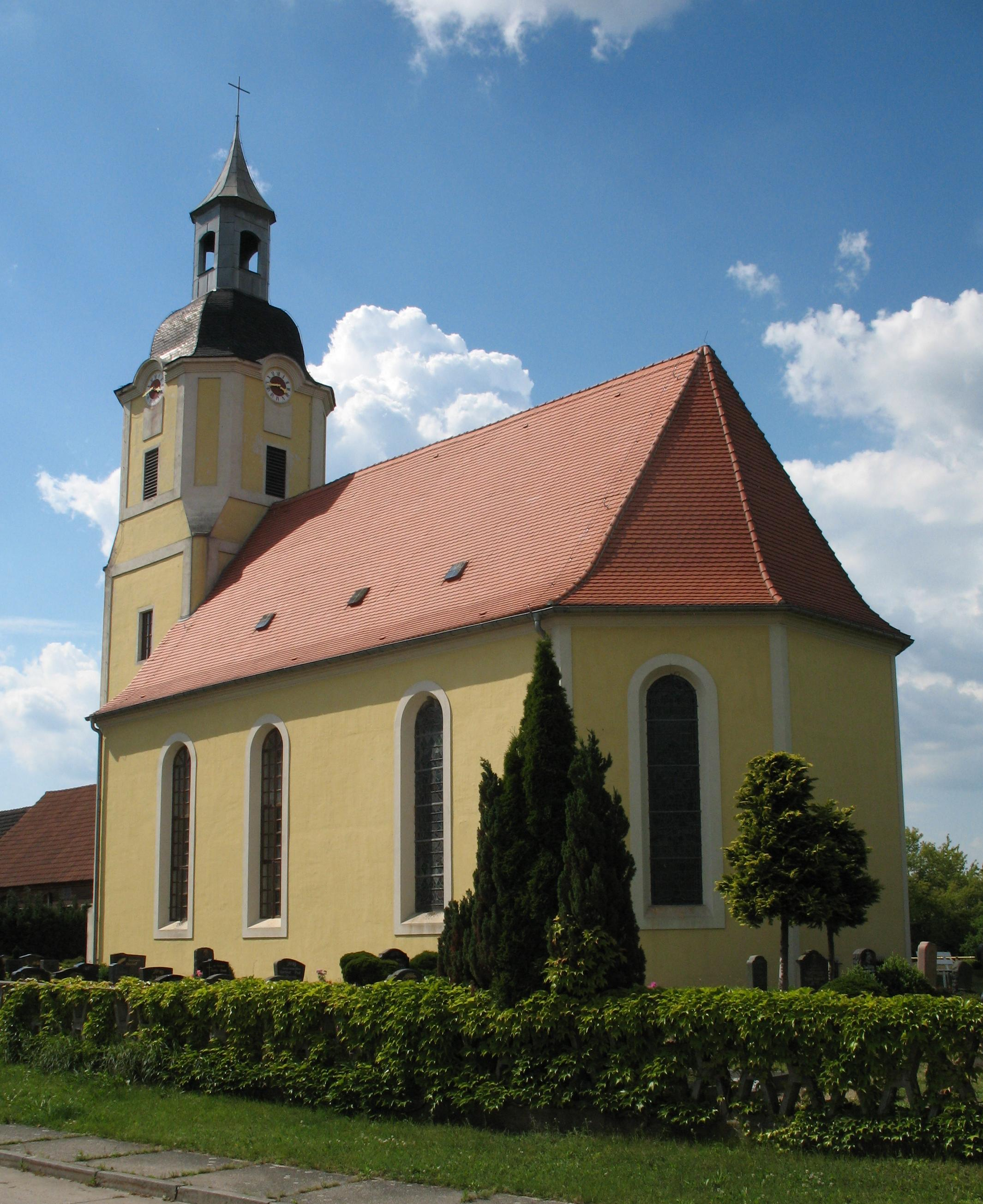
Church

== Sons and daughters of the community ==
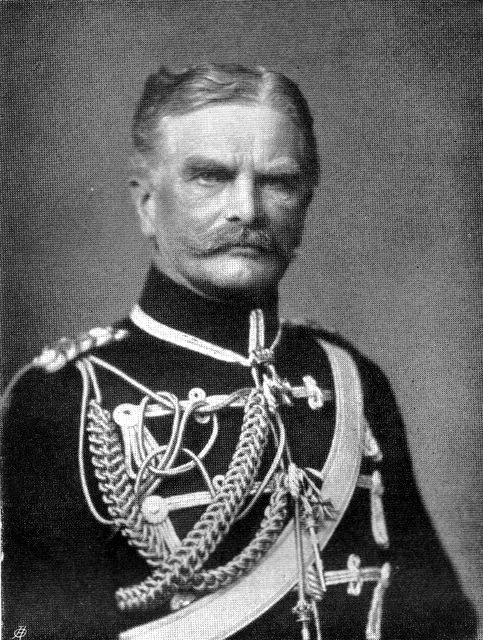
August von Mackensen during WW I

- August von Mackensen (* 1849 in House Leipnitz, † 1945 in Burghorn), Prussian field marshal (Generalfeldmarschall)
- Otto Küstner (* 1849 in Trossin, † 1931 ibid.) Gynecologist, professor at the University of Breslau, honorary member of the Academy of Natural Sciences Leopoldina
