= Arzberg, Saxony =

Arzberg
- Municipality
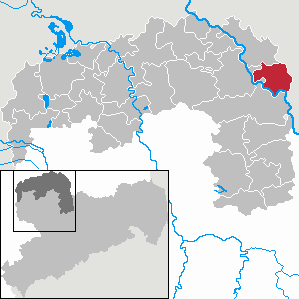
- Location of Arzberg within Nordsachsen district
- Interactive map of Arzberg
- Location within Germany Location within Saxony
- Coordinates: 51°32′N 13°8′E
- Country: Germany
- State: Saxony
- District: Nordsachsen

Government
  - Mayor (2023–30): Holger Reinboth (CDU)

Area
  - Total: 58.55 km^{2} (22.61 sq mi)
- Elevation: 84 m (276 ft)

Population (2025-12-31)
  - Total: 1,741
  - Density: 29.74/km^{2} (77.01/sq mi)
- Time zone: UTC+01:00 (CET)
  - Summer (DST): UTC+02:00 (CEST)
- Postal codes: 04886
- Dialling codes: 034222
- Vehicle registration: TDO, DZ, EB, OZ, TG, TO
- Website: www.gemeinde-arzberg.de

Arzberg (German pronunciation: [ˈaʁtsbɛʁk]) is a municipality in the district Nordsachsen, in Saxony, Germany.

== History ==
From 1815 to 1944, Arzberg was part of the Prussian Province of Saxony, from 1944 to 1945 of the Province of Halle-Merseburg, from 1945 to 1952 of the State of Saxony-Anhalt, from 1952 to 1990 of the Bezirk Leipzig of East Germany and since 1990 of Saxony.

== Gallery ==
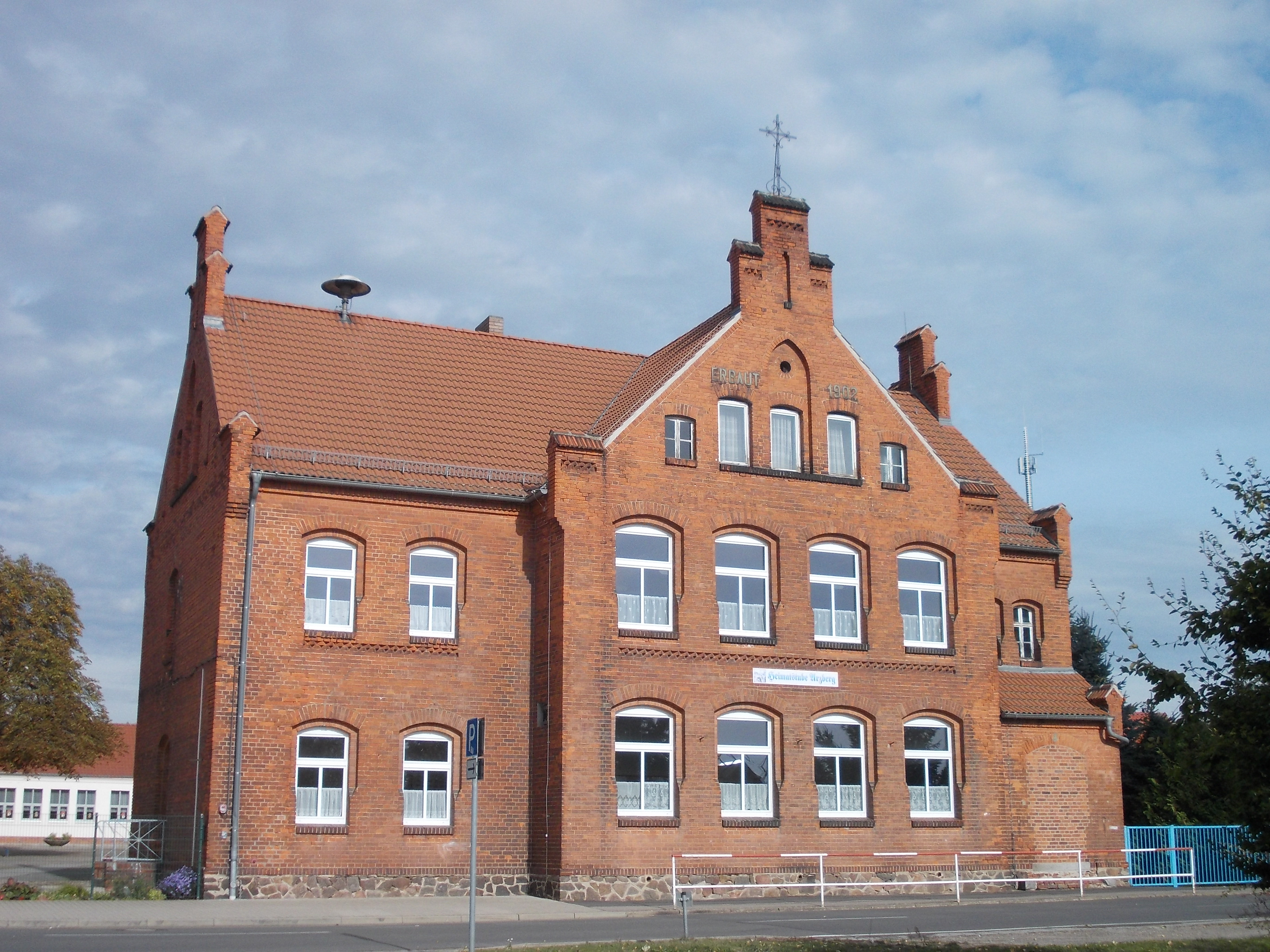
Old school building, now museum of local history

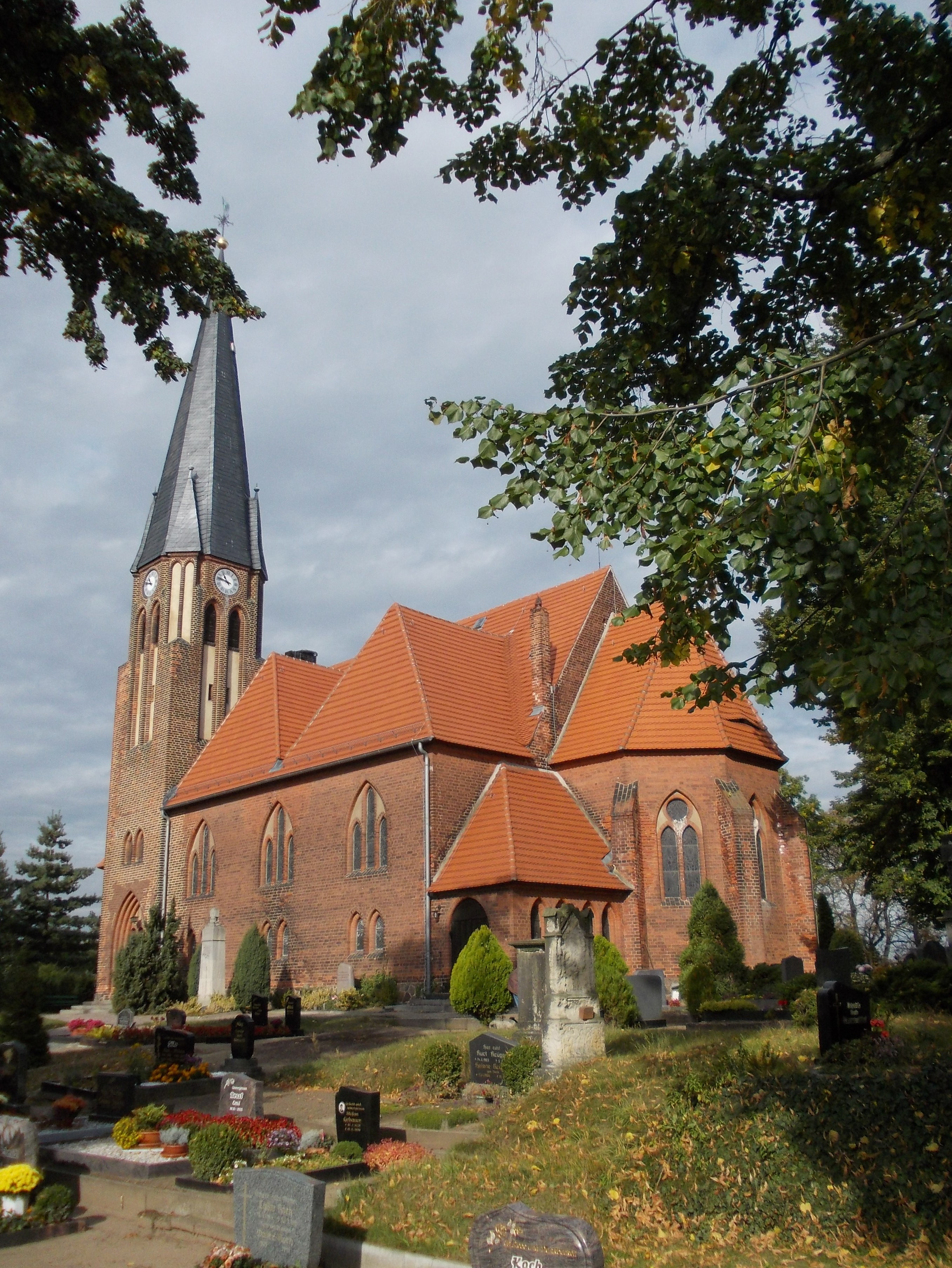
Arzberg church

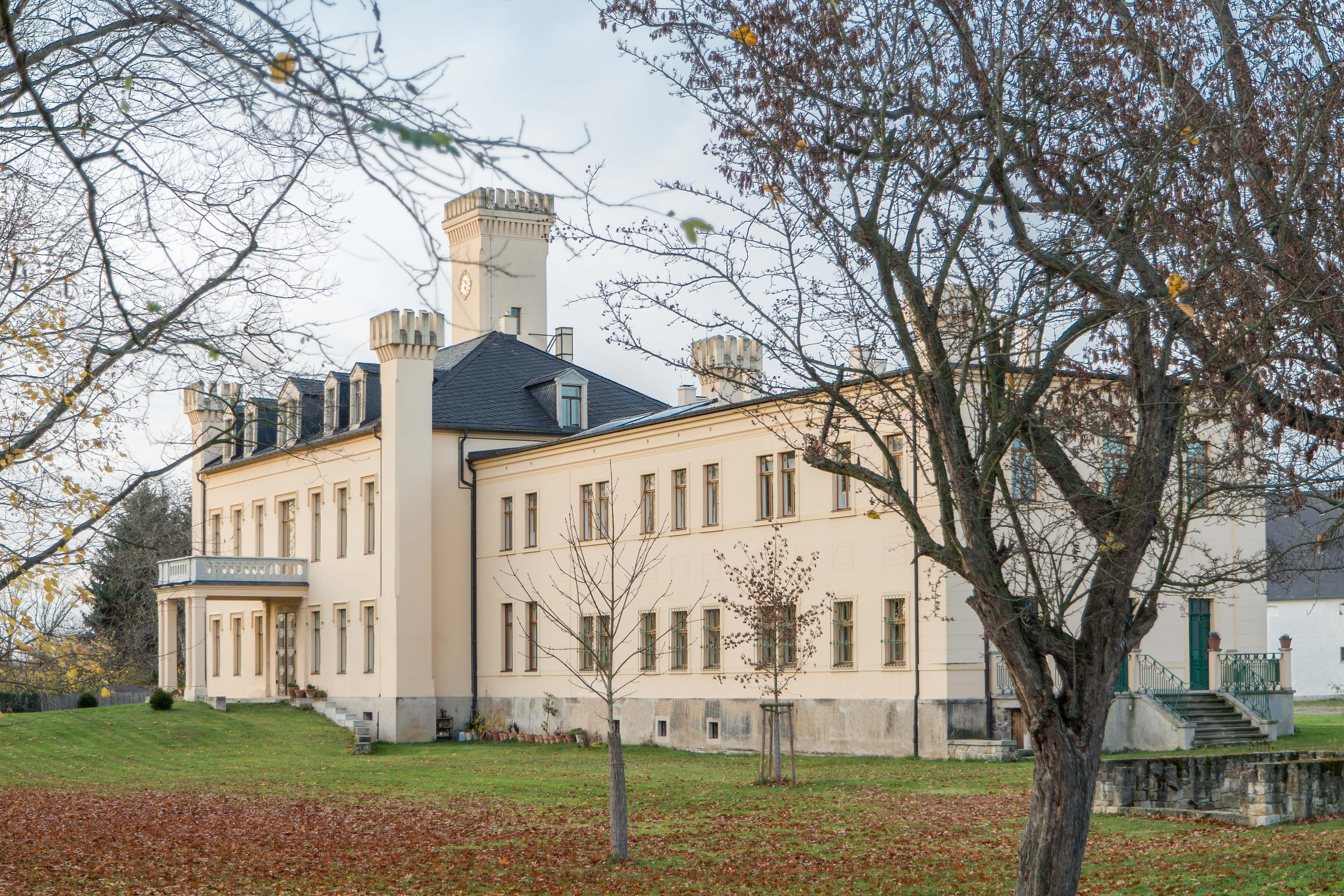
Pülswerda castle

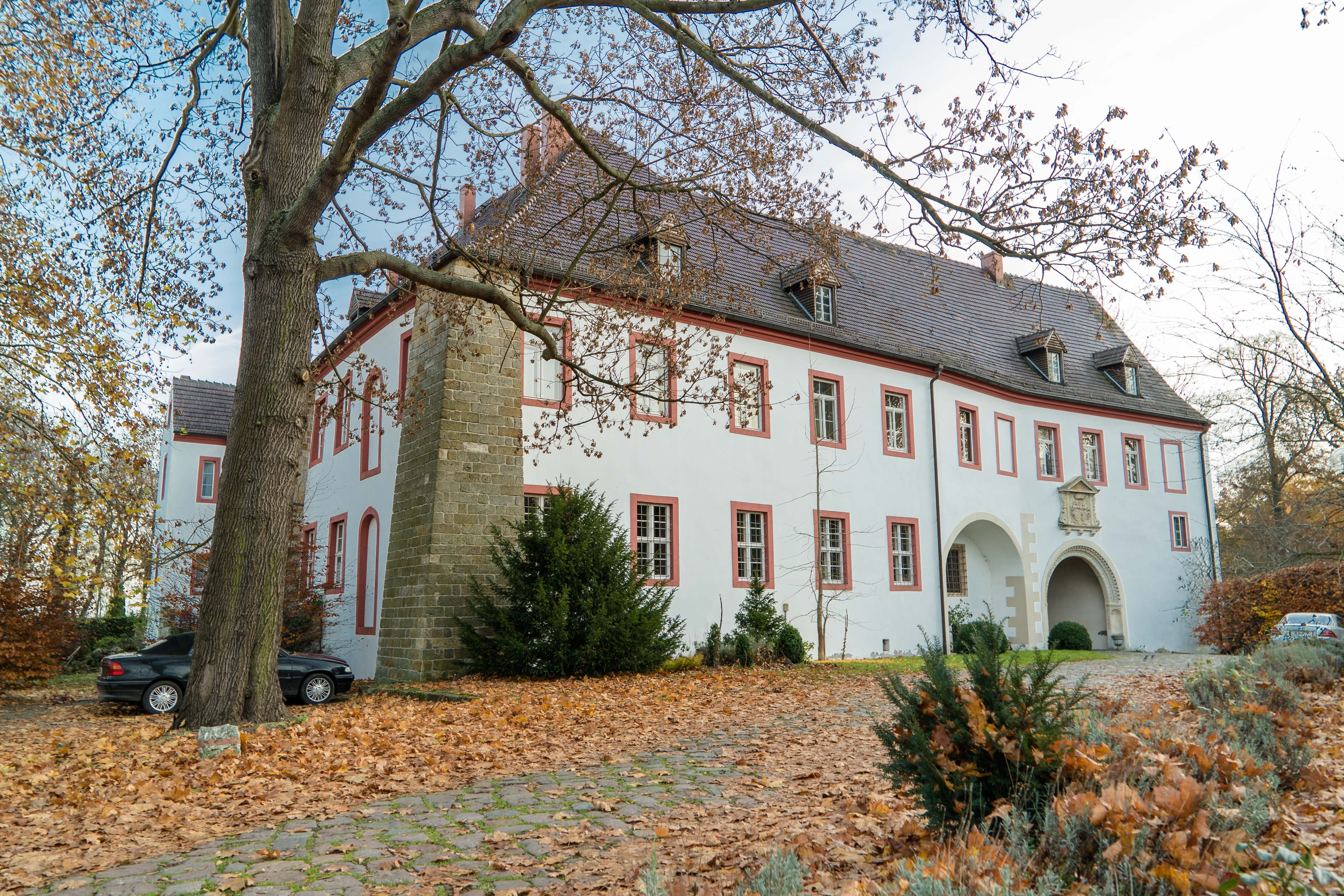
Triestewitz castle
