= Löbnitz =

- Municipality
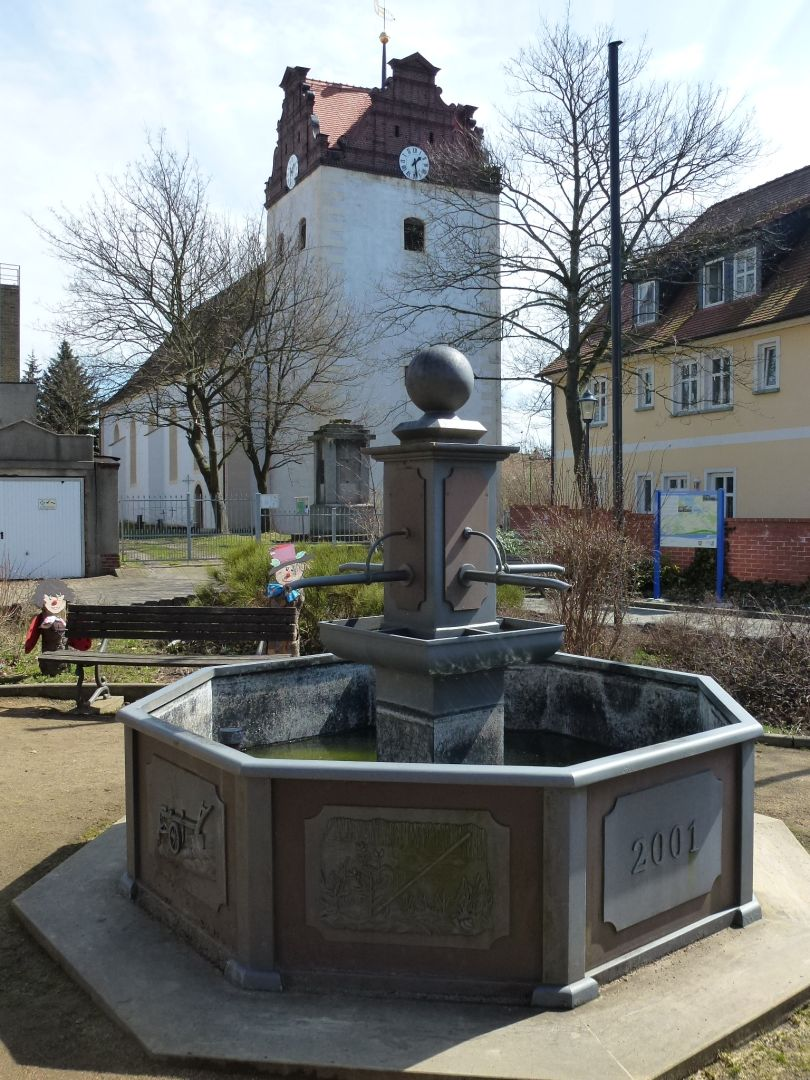

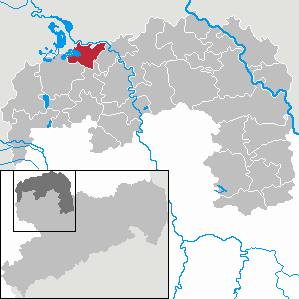
- Location of Löbnitz within Nordsachsen district
- Interactive map of Löbnitz
- Location within Germany Location within Saxony
- Coordinates: 51°36′N 12°28′E
- Country: Germany
- State: Saxony
- District: Nordsachsen
- Subdivisions: 2

Government
  - Mayor (2019–26): Detlef Hoffmann (CDU)

Area
  - Total: 37.20 km^{2} (14.36 sq mi)
- Elevation: 86 m (282 ft)

Population (2025-12-31)
  - Total: 2,047
  - Density: 55.03/km^{2} (142.5/sq mi)
- Time zone: UTC+01:00 (CET)
  - Summer (DST): UTC+02:00 (CEST)
- Postal codes: 04509
- Dialling codes: 034208
- Vehicle registration: TDO, DZ, EB, OZ, TG, TO

Löbnitz is a municipality in the district of Nordsachsen, in Saxony, Germany. It has an area of 37.20 km^{2} and a population of 2,250 (as of 31 December 2006).

== Horse riding ==
Löbnitz has a strong horse riding community. The municipality is home to three horse riding clubs. The investment in horse breeding dates back to the Knights "von Schönberg".
