= Elsnig =

- Municipality
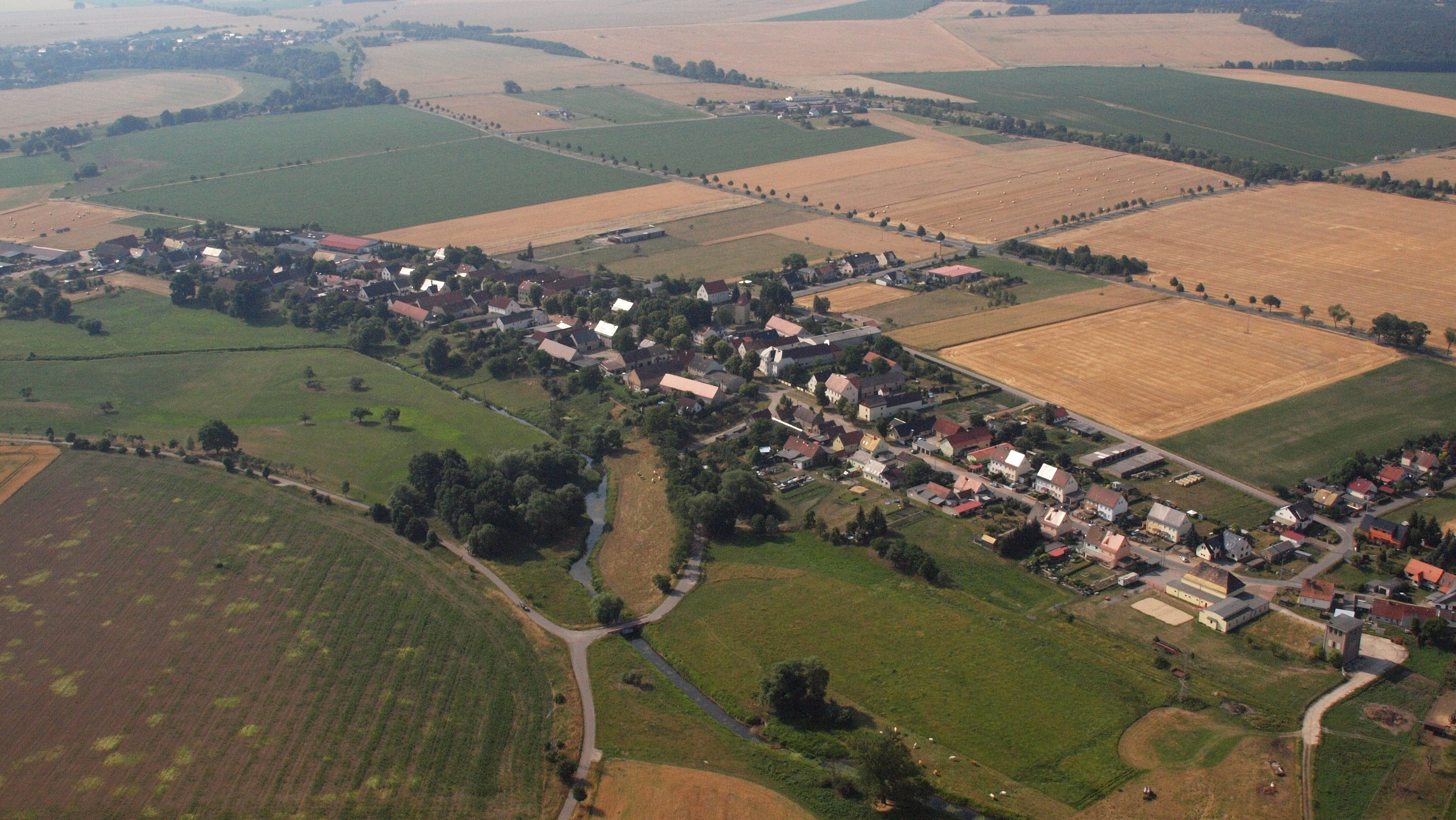

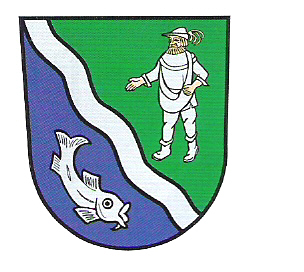
- Coat of arms

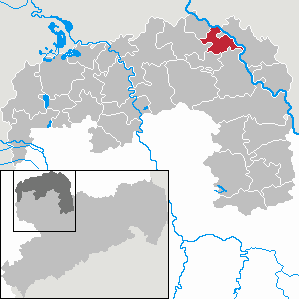
- Location of Elsnig within Nordsachsen district
- Interactive map of Elsnig
- Location within Germany Location within Saxony
- Coordinates: 51°36′N 12°56′E
- Country: Germany
- State: Saxony
- District: Nordsachsen

Government
  - Mayor (2020–27): Stefan Schieritz (FDP)

Area
  - Total: 36.76 km^{2} (14.19 sq mi)
- Elevation: 88 m (289 ft)

Population (2025-12-31)
  - Total: 1,313
  - Density: 35.72/km^{2} (92.51/sq mi)
- Time zone: UTC+01:00 (CET)
  - Summer (DST): UTC+02:00 (CEST)
- Postal codes: 04886
- Dialling codes: 03421 u. 034223
- Vehicle registration: TDO, DZ, EB, OZ, TG, TO
- Website: www.dommitzsch.de

Elsnig is a municipality in the district Nordsachsen, in Saxony, Germany, located about 140 km southwest of Berlin.
