= Schönwölkau =

- Municipality
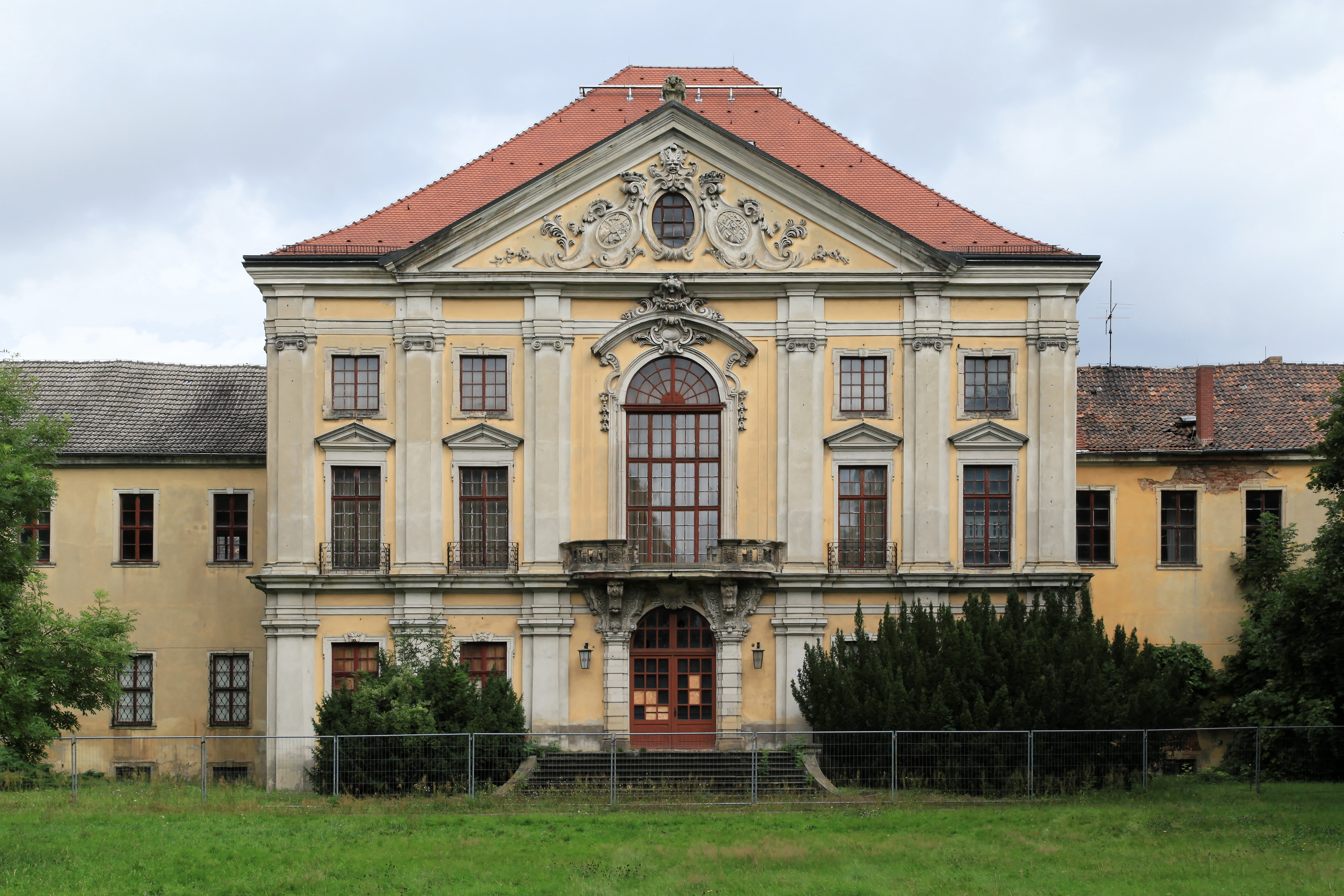
- Schloss Schönwölkau in Schönwölkau

- Coat of arms

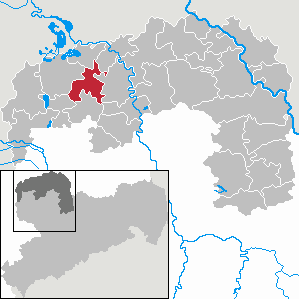
- Location of Schönwölkau within Nordsachsen district
- Interactive map of Schönwölkau
- Location within Germany Location within Saxony
- Coordinates: 51°31′N 12°29′E
- Country: Germany
- State: Saxony
- District: Nordsachsen
- Subdivisions: 5

Government
  - Mayor (2023–30): Jens Kottenhahn (SPD)

Area
  - Total: 49.15 km^{2} (18.98 sq mi)
- Elevation: 63 m (207 ft)

Population (2025-12-31)
  - Total: 2,614
  - Density: 53.18/km^{2} (137.7/sq mi)
- Time zone: UTC+01:00 (CET)
  - Summer (DST): UTC+02:00 (CEST)
- Postal codes: 04509
- Dialling codes: 034295
- Vehicle registration: TDO
- Website: www.schoenwoelkau.de

Schönwölkau is a municipality in the district of Nordsachsen, in Saxony, Germany.
