= Eilenburg =

Town in Saxony, Germany

- Town
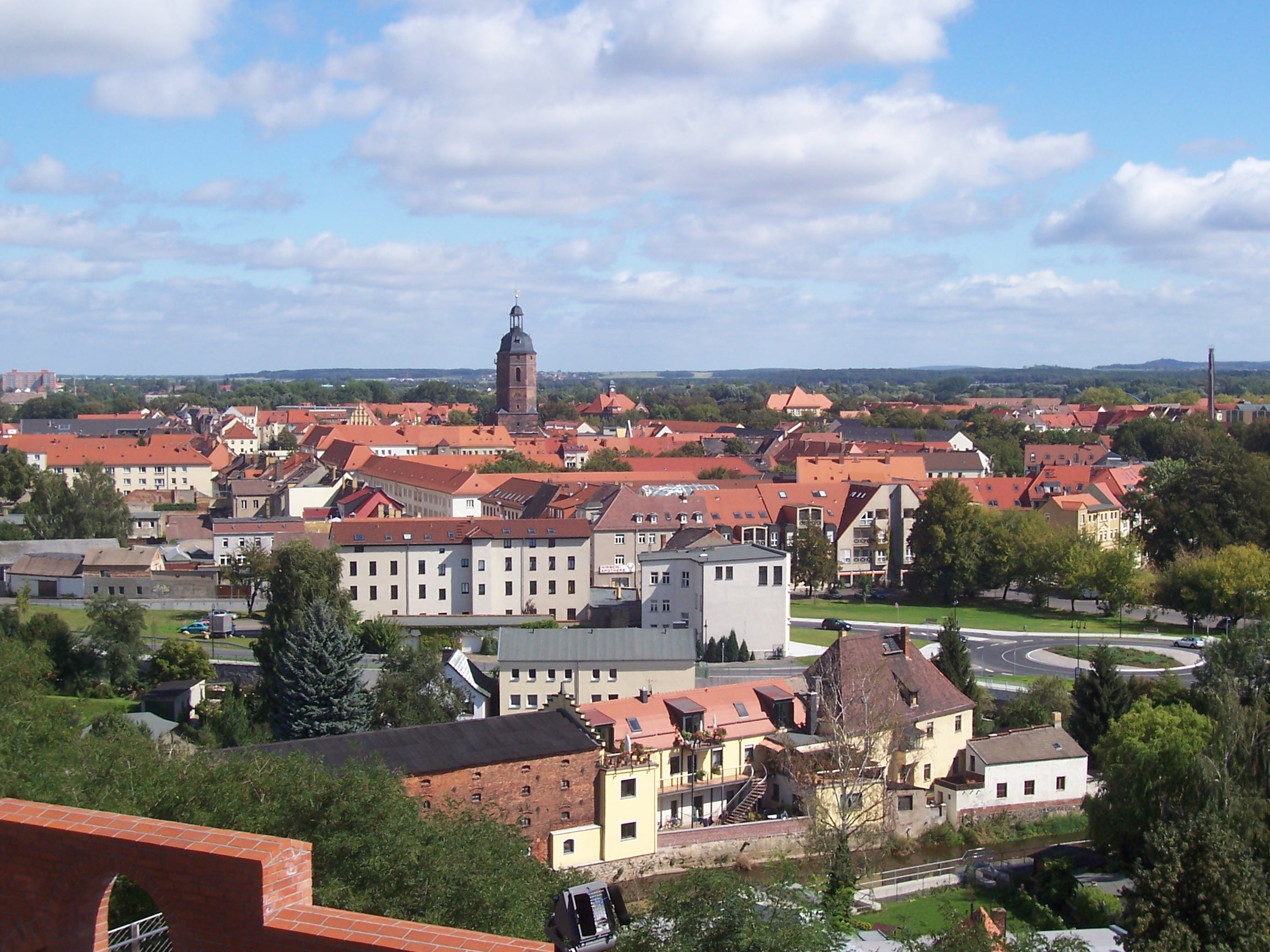

- Coat of arms

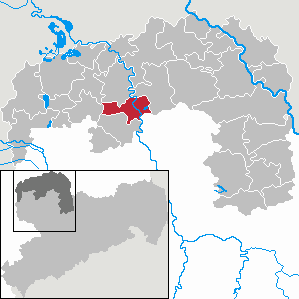
- Location of Eilenburg within Nordsachsen district
- Interactive map of Eilenburg
- Location within Germany Location within Saxony
- Coordinates: 51°27′39″N 12°38′09″E
- Country: Germany
- State: Saxony
- District: Nordsachsen
- Subdivisions: 3 Stadtteile; 6 Ortsteile

Government
  - Mayor (2022–29): Ralf Scheler (Ind.)

Area
  - Total: 46.84 km^{2} (18.09 sq mi)
- Elevation: 106 m (348 ft)

Population (2025-12-31)
  - Total: 16,507
  - Density: 352.4/km^{2} (912.7/sq mi)
- Time zone: UTC+01:00 (CET)
  - Summer (DST): UTC+02:00 (CEST)
- Postal codes: 04838
- Dialling codes: 03423
- Vehicle registration: TDO, DZ, EB, OZ, TG, TO
- Website: www.eilenburg.de

Eilenburg (German pronunciation: [ˈaɪ̯lənˌbʊʁk]; Upper Sorbian: Jiłow, pronounced [ˈjiwɔf]) is a town in Germany. It lies in the district of Nordsachsen in Saxony, approximately 20 km northeast of the city of Leipzig.

== Geography ==
Eilenburg lies at the banks of the river Mulde at the southwestern edge of the Düben Heath wildlife park. The town is subdivided into three urban districts: Berg, Mitte and Ost and six rural districts named Behlitz, Hainichen, Kospa, Pressen, Wedelwitz and Zschettgau.

Neighbouring towns and cities are Leipzig (20 kilometres distant), Delitzsch (21), Bad Düben (16), Torgau (25) and Wurzen (12).

== History ==
Map of Eilenburg (around 1750)

Eilenburg Castle was first mentioned on 29 July 961 in a document by Otto I. as civitas Ilburg. The name has Slavic origin and means town with clay deposits. A settlement of tradespeople probably developed from the 11th century in the vicinity of the castle. The town was incorporated in the Margravate of Meissen in 1386.

In the 16th century Eilenburg was central to several events of the Protestant Reformation. Even George, Duke of Saxony, called this town a noteworthy place ("namhaftigen Ort"). Martin Luther was in Eilenburg seven times and called it a blessed lard pit ("gesegnete Schmalzgrube").

The Thirty Years' War left its mark on Eilenburg. The town was initially spared fighting, but it suffered from the catastrophic economic effects of the war. From 1631 the town was directly involved in the war. In 1632 the body of King Gustavus Adolphus of Sweden was laid out in the Red Deer Inn ("Gasthof Roter Hirsch") after he had been killed in the Battle of Lützen (1632). In 1639 Eilenburg was conquered by the troops of Georg von Derfflinger. In 1646 peace negotiations between Saxony and Sweden began in Eilenburg to extend the expiring Armistice of Kötzschenbroda. On 14 September 1648 the Treaty of Eilenburg was signed and meant the end of the Thirty Years' War for Saxony, and as a consequence the town recovered.

The slow onset of economic recovery came to a sudden end with the start of the Seven Years' War. Virtually each male in Eilenburg had to serve in the armed forces. The city was occupied alternately by the Austrian Empire and the Kingdom of Prussia. In the following years Eilenburg turned into an impoverished and dirty old town. At the end of the 18th century, the economy stagnated and Eilenburg became an even more insignificant town.

In 1813 during the War of the Sixth Coalition shortly before the Battle of Leipzig, Napoleon took a last view of his and his allies' Saxon troops in eastern Eilenburg. After Napoleon's defeat, Saxony had to cede large territory to Prussia under the provisions of the Congress of Vienna. Eilenburg was part of the Province of Saxony within the progressive Prussian state. Thereby the transition of Eilenburg to an industrial city was advanced significantly.

Because of the founding of numerous textile factories, Eilenburg, with its proximity to the Prussian capital Berlin, became an important centre of Prussian textile production. The ascent to an important industrial city came mainly from the nearby Kingdom of Saxony. Saxon industrialists settled in Eilenburg for having duty-free access to the Prussian market. The onset of urbanization caused a rapid increase in population. The social tensions resulting from the industrialization and the huge growth of population triggered a strong labour movement. In 1849 the Health Insurance Support Association ("Krankenkassenunterstützungsverein") was founded. In 1850 the Food Association of Eilenburg ("Eilenburger Lebensmittelassociation") as the first food cooperative of Germany and "Darlehnskassenverein" as the first credit union in Germany were founded. Carl Degenkolb, owner of a factory in Eilenburg and member of the Frankfurt Parliament, voluntarily instituted the first German works councils at his factory.

On 30 June 1872 Eilenburg station was opened with the Halle-Eilenburg-Falkenberg route. Two years later, transport services started on the newly built Leipzig–Eilenburg railway. Industrial development continued rapidly with development of the chemical, wood and metal processing industries. The German Celluloid Factory ("Deutsche Celluliod-Fabrik") founded in 1887 characterized the city's business for more than a hundred years.

During World War I hundreds of Eilenburg people were called up for military service. On 21 October 1917 Wilhelm Pieck, later a President of the German Democratic Republic, escaped from a military transport at Eilenburg station. A total of about 800 people from Eilenburg were killed during the war.

About two weeks before the end of the World War II the city was almost completely destroyed. On 17 April 1945 American troops reached Eilenburg, which German defenses were ordered to hold. For three days and three nights the town was under heavy artillery fire, which destroyed most of the buildings of the city. Two hundred people were killed and 90 percent of the town centre and 65 percent of the buildings of the whole town were destroyed; the American army had nearly no losses. Eilenburg was one of the most heavily damaged cities in Germany.

The town centre was rebuilt in the 1950s. In 1952 the city became the seat of the Eilenburg District in Bezirk Leipzig, newly formed by the administrative reform in East Germany. In the eastern part of Eilenburg large new housing areas were built. In autumn 1989 up to seven thousand inhabitants formed peaceful demonstrations demanding a change ("Wende") especially on the political level. After German reunification some long-established state socialist companies went out of business. Dismantling of jobs could only be partially offset by new business settlements on newly created industrial areas outside the town. In 1994 Eilenburg District was annexed by Delitzsch District in the course of district reform.

In 2002 Eilenburg was hit hard by flood of the river Mulde. The damages amounted to €135 million. The construction of flood protection facilities was intensified after the flood. In 2008 the construction measures ended after investments amounting to €35 million. Eilenburg was the first city in Saxony completely protected against flood. Since 1 August 2008 Eilenburg lies roughly in the middle of the then newly formed Nordsachsen (northern Saxony) District.

== Twinned cities ==
- Butzbach, Hesse, Germany
- Jihlava, Czech Republic
- Rawicz, Poland
- Anjalankoski, Finland
- Sukhumi, Abchasia / Georgia

== Notable residents ==
- Franz Abt (1819–1885), composer and choral conductor
- Ulrike Gräßler (born 1987), ski jumper
- Wilfried Gröbner (born 1949), football player, member of the gold winning team at the 1976 olympics
- Harald Heinke (born 1955), judoka
- Gustav Höcker (1832–1911), writer
- Alexander König (born 1966), pair skater and skating coach
- Ute Kostrzewa (born 1961), volleyball player
- Karina Kraushaar (1971–2015), actress
- Friedrich Ludwig Kreysig (1770–1839), physician and botanist
- Karl August Möbius (1825–1908), zoologist
- Karl Neumann (1916–1985), youth book author
- Carl Ludwig Nietzsche (1813–1849), Lutheran pastor, father of Friedrich Nietzsche
- Martin Rinckart (1586–1649), Lutheran clergyman and hymnist
- Marco Thomas (born 1972), clarinetist, professor of clarinet at the University of the Arts Bremen
- Karl Ludwig von Le Coq (1754–1829), Prussian General Officer and cartographer
