= Dommitzsch =

- Town
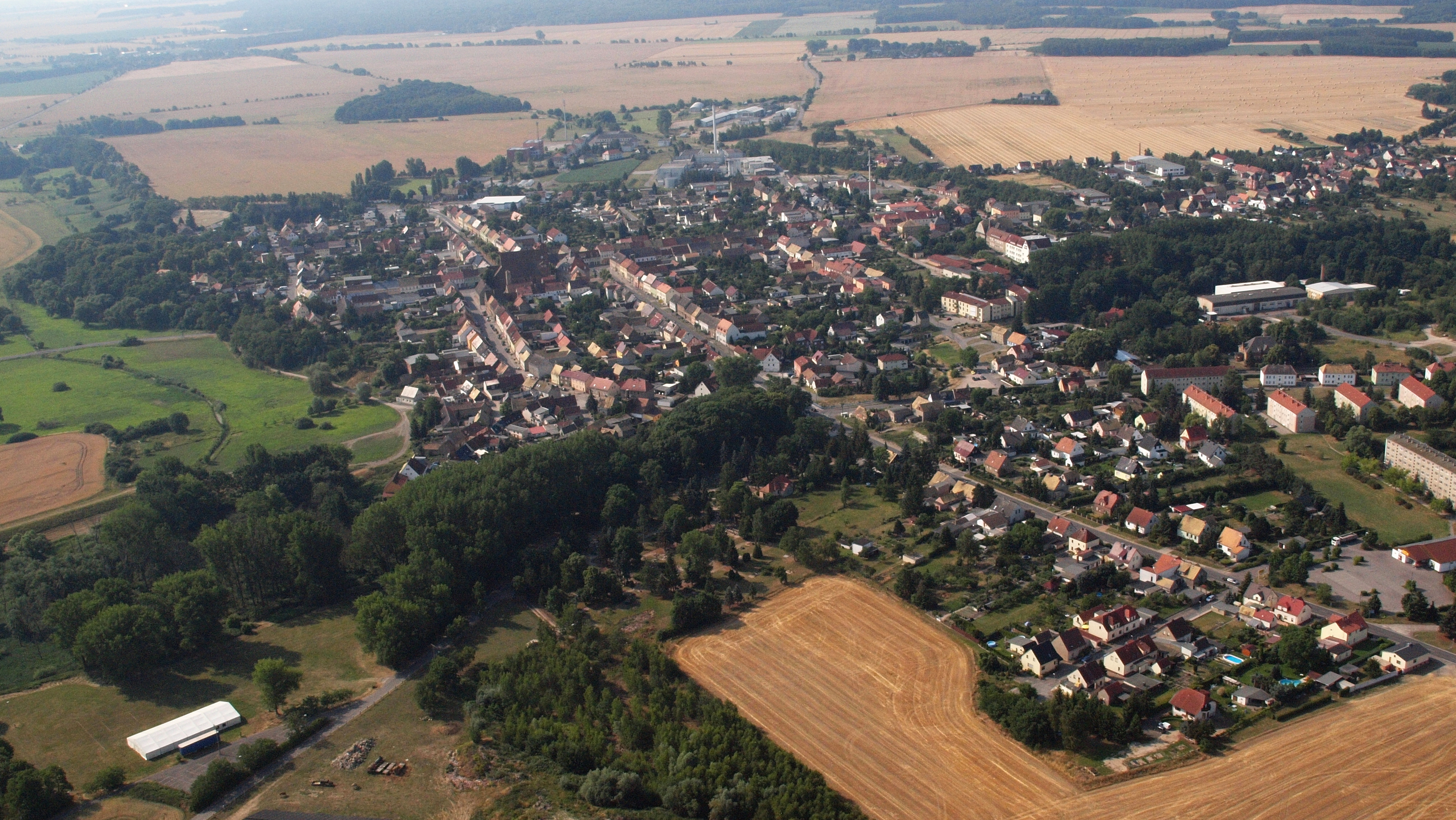
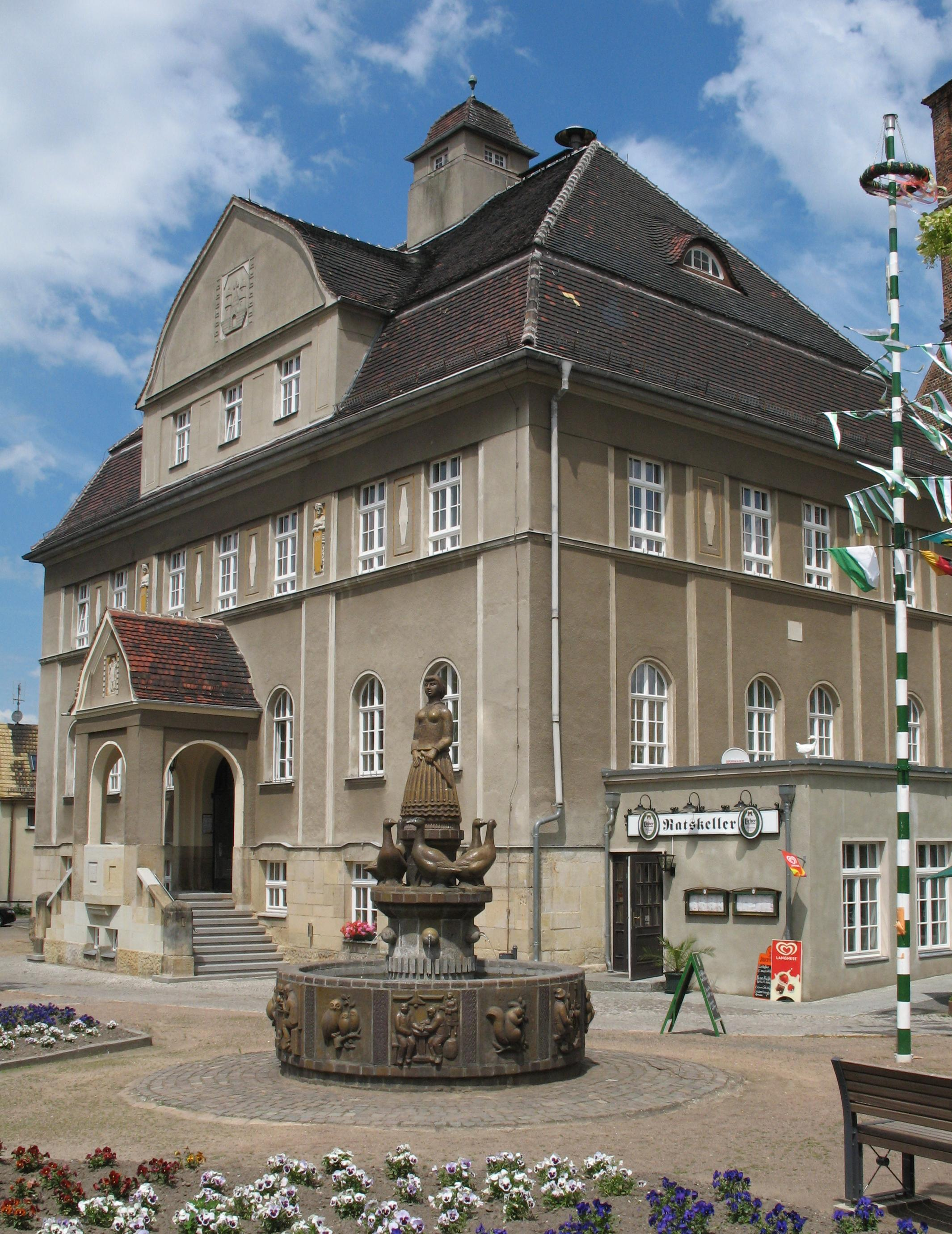
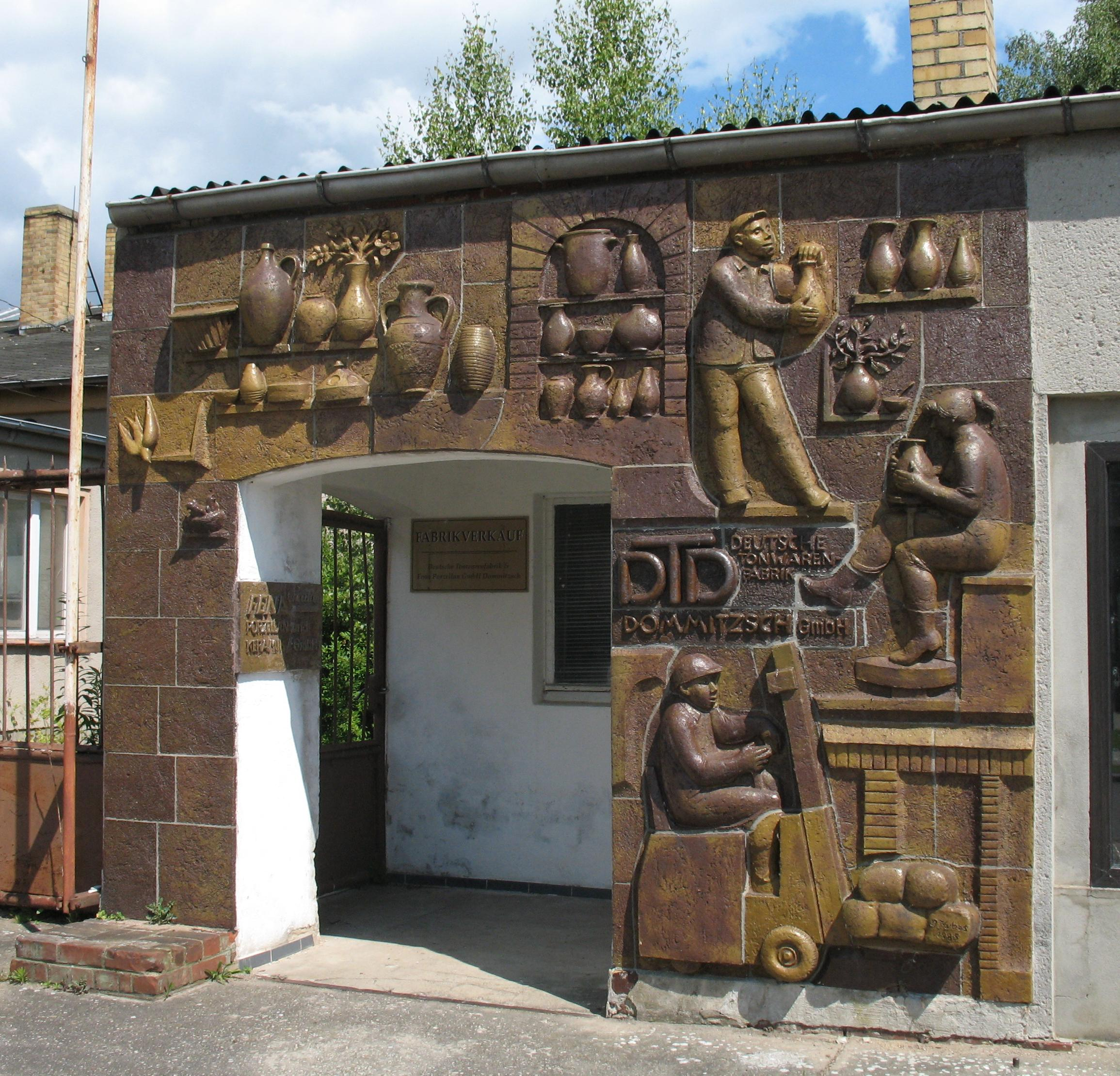
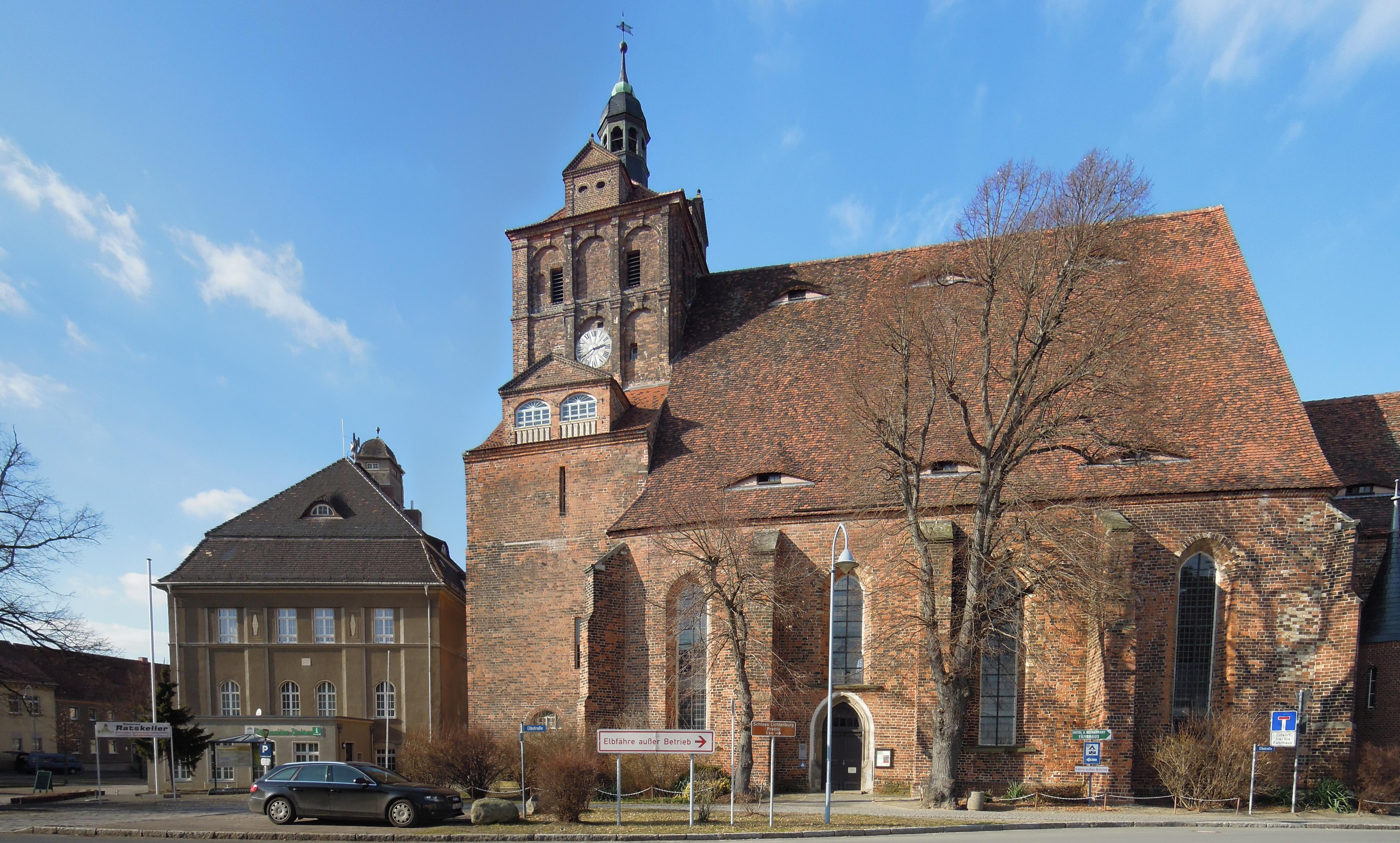
- Dommitzsch from air Town hall Former pottery factory St. Marien church

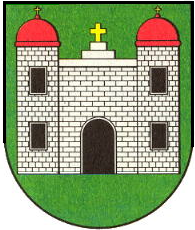
- Coat of arms

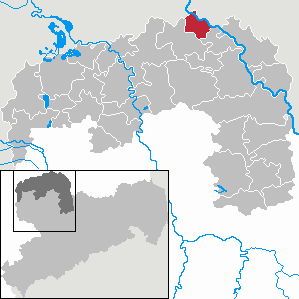
- Location of Dommitzsch within Nordsachsen district
- Interactive map of Dommitzsch
- Location within Germany Location within Saxony
- Coordinates: 51°39′N 12°53′E
- Country: Germany
- State: Saxony
- District: Nordsachsen

Government
  - Mayor (2022–29): Bernd Schlobach (SPD)

Area
  - Total: 30.44 km^{2} (11.75 sq mi)
- Elevation: 83 m (272 ft)

Population (2025-12-31)
  - Total: 2,206
  - Density: 72.47/km^{2} (187.7/sq mi)
- Time zone: UTC+01:00 (CET)
  - Summer (DST): UTC+02:00 (CEST)
- Postal codes: 04880
- Dialling codes: 034223
- Vehicle registration: TDO, DZ, EB, OZ, TG, TO
- Website: www.dommitzsch.de

Dommitzsch (German pronunciation: [ˈdɔmɪtʃ]) is a town in the district Nordsachsen, in Saxony, Germany and is Saxony's northmost city. It lies on the left bank of the Elbe, 12 km northwest of Torgau and 31 km southeast of Wittenberg.
