= Nordsachsen =

Coordinates: 51°30′N 12°45′E

- District
- Flag Coat of arms
- Country: Germany
- State: Saxony
- Capital: Torgau

Government
  - District admin.: Kai Emanuel (Independent)

Area
  - Total: 2,020 km^{2} (780 sq mi)

Population (31 December 2025)
  - Total: 198,639
  - Density: 98.3/km^{2} (255/sq mi)
- Time zone: UTC+01:00 (CET)
  - Summer (DST): UTC+02:00 (CEST)
- Vehicle registration: TDO, DZ, EB, TG, TO, OZ
- Website: www.landkreis-nordsachsen.de

Nordsachsen (German pronunciation: [ˈnɔʁtˌzaksn̩], lit. 'North Saxony') is a district (Kreis) in Saxony, Germany.

== History ==
The district was established by merging the former districts of Delitzsch and Torgau-Oschatz as part of the district reform of August 2008.

On 10 December 2009 the district council adopted the district's new coat of arms.

“Or a lion rampant Sable armed and langued Gules between two pallets wavy Azure.”

== Geography ==
The district is located in the plains north and east of Leipzig. The main rivers of the district are the Mulde and the Elbe. The district borders (from the west and clockwise) the states Saxony-Anhalt and Brandenburg, the districts of Meißen, Mittelsachsen and Leipzig, and the urban district Leipzig.

== Towns and municipalities ==
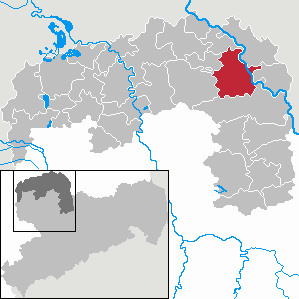
Clickable map of towns and municipalities in the district

Towns
Municipalities
Verwaltungsverband
1. Bad Düben
2. Belgern-Schildau
3. Dahlen
4. Delitzsch
5. Dommitzsch
6. Eilenburg
7. Mügeln
8. Oschatz
9. Schkeuditz
10. Taucha
11. Torgau
1. Arzberg
2. Beilrode
3. Cavertitz
4. Doberschütz
5. Dreiheide
6. Elsnig
7. Krostitz
8. Laußig
9. Liebschützberg
10. Löbnitz
11. Mockrehna
12. Naundorf
13. Rackwitz
14. Schönwölkau
15. Trossin
16. Wermsdorf
17. Wiedemar

Eilenburg-West

1. Jesewitz
2. Zschepplin
