= Taucha =

Town in Saxony, Germany

- Town
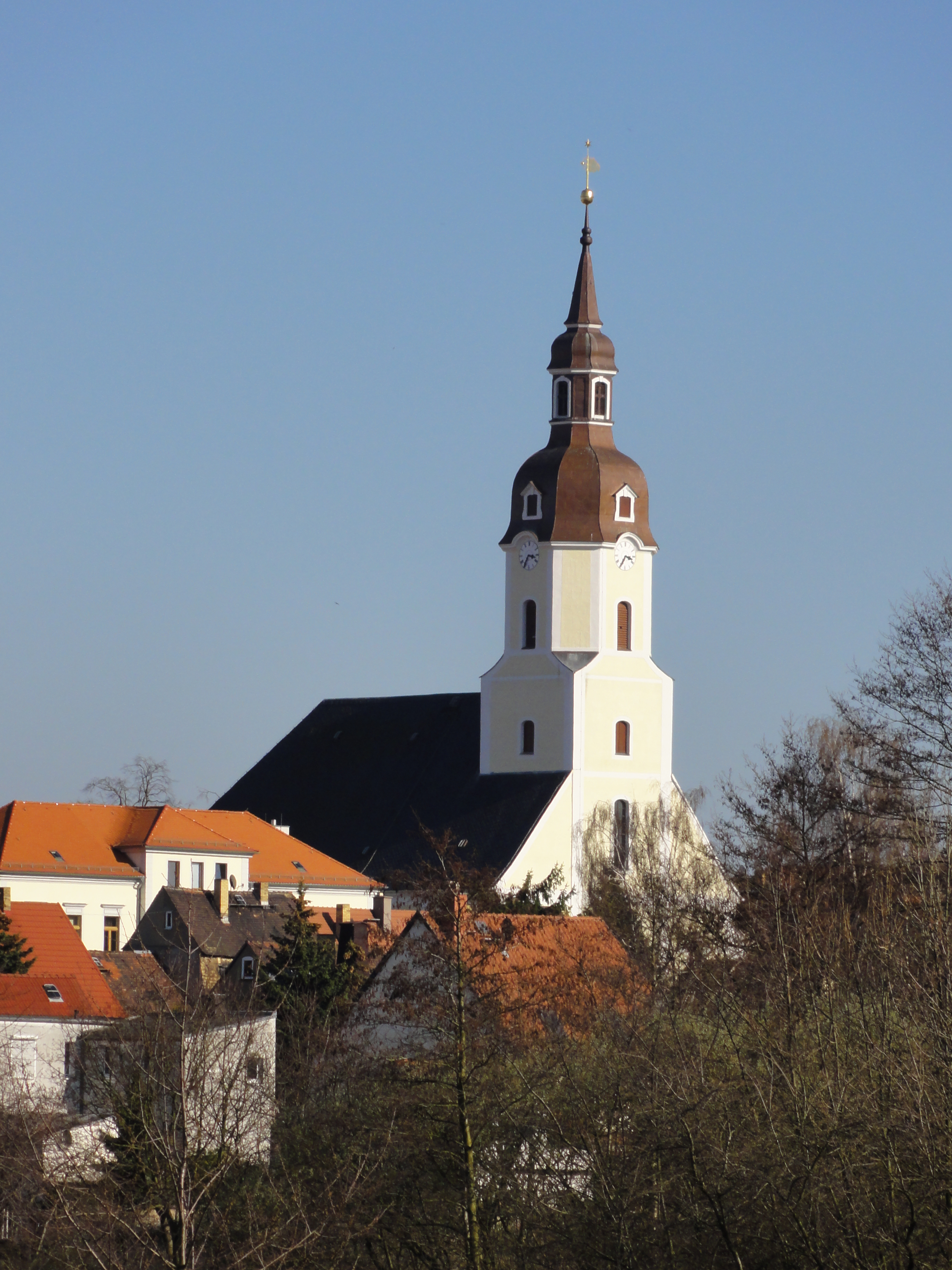

- Coat of arms

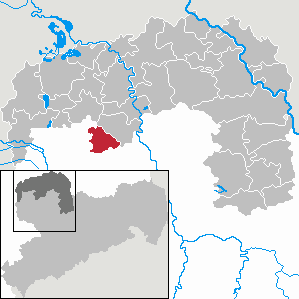
- Location of Taucha within Nordsachsen district
- Interactive map of Taucha
- Location within Germany Location within Saxony
- Coordinates: 51°22′48″N 12°29′37″E
- Country: Germany
- State: Saxony
- District: Nordsachsen
- Subdivisions: 9

Government
  - Mayor (2022–29): Tobias Meier (FDP)

Area
  - Total: 33.23 km^{2} (12.83 sq mi)
- Elevation: 128 m (420 ft)

Population (2025-12-31)
  - Total: 15,815
  - Density: 475.9/km^{2} (1,233/sq mi)
- Time zone: UTC+01:00 (CET)
  - Summer (DST): UTC+02:00 (CEST)
- Postal codes: 04425
- Dialling codes: 034298
- Vehicle registration: TDO, DZ, EB, OZ, TG, TO
- Website: taucha.de

Taucha (German pronunciation: [ˈtaʊxa]) is a town in the district of Nordsachsen, in Saxony, Germany. It is situated on the river Parthe, 10 km northeast of Leipzig.

== Geography ==
Taucha is part of the Leipzig Bay. The Parthe runs through the city, and its expansive floodplain surrounding the city is a protected nature area. The landscape outside of the floodplain was formed by ice age (Wolstonian Stage) terminal moraines. Remains of former volcanoes, which have been used as stone quarries, can still be found in the area.

Taucha consists of the city of Taucha itself and the districts Cradefeld, Dewitz, Graßdorf, Merkwitz, Plösitz, Pönitz, Seegeritz, and Sehlis.

Annexations to Taucha
Original municipality	Date	Notes
Cradefeld	January 1, 1934	Annexed to Taucha
Dewitz	April 1, 1937	Annexed to Taucha
Döbitz	1929	Annexed to Dewitz
Graßdorf	1934	Annexed to Taucha
Merkwitz	October 1, 1992	Annexed to Taucha
Plösitz	April 1, 1937	Annexed to Taucha
Pönitz	December 1, 1991	Annexed to Taucha
Seegeritz	April 1, 1973	Annexed to Merkwitz
Sehlis	October 1, 1973	Annexed to Taucha

== History ==
The location was first mentioned by Bishop Thietmar of Merseburg in 974 as urbs Cothung. In 1170, the market town Tuch was awarded town privileges by the Archbishop of Magdeburg Wichmann von Seeburg. This planted the seeds of a rivalry with Leipzig, which belonged at the time to the Margravate of Meissen. As an apparent attempt to express the city's independence, Archbishop Albert von Magdeburg commissioned a castle and city wall in 1220.

In 1282 Dietrich von Landsberg, the Margrave of Meissen, sieged the city and razed the castle after capturing it. After Archbishop Otto von Hessen finally renounced ownership of the city in 1355, Taucha became a fief of the Margravate of Meissen. In 1569, the Leipzig council bought the city and manor in Taucha.

In 1621 a mint (facility) was established in the city. The mint produced so-called Kippermünzen, a coin currency used during the crisis of Kipper und Wipper.

Several major plagues swept the location between 1626 and 1680. The area was further destroyed between 1631 and 1644, during the Thirty Years' War. The city wall was torn down in 1819 and 1820. In 1832 Taucha became a fully independent city. It remained until 1856 a member of Electorate of Saxony (later the Kingdom of Saxony). The city was a member of the Gerichtsamt Taucha from 1856 until 1875, when it joined the administrative district (Amtshauptmannschaft) of Leipzig.

In 1935 the group Mitteldeutsche Motorenwerke, a subsidiary of the Auto Union, began construction of an engine works in the city on Graßdorfer Straße. The plant was camouflaged in a large forest area, partially lying in the city of Leipzig. This area inside of Leipzig was forcibly reassigned to Taucha on April 1, 1939. Bombing attacks seriously damaged the factory in 1944. From 1946 to 1947 the factory buildings were stripped and the buildings were exploded.

In 1944 and 1945 a subcamp of the Buchenwald concentration camp was located on what today is Mathias-Erzberger-Straße. The camp fit 440 prisoners, who performed forced labour at HASAG. A subcamp of 1,200 women, mostly Jews, were likewise forced to support military production. Most of the prisoners did not survive a death march in 1945 after the closure of the camps. Next to these camps were 12 additional forced labor camps and prisoner of war camps, whose prisoners worked for the Mitteldeutsche Motorenwerke GmbH (also known as "Mimo"). These latter camps belonged at the time to the district Pönitz.

In 1999 Taucha was reassigned from the district Leipziger Land to Delitzsch district. In the course of the Saxon district reforms of 2008, Taucha became part of Nordsachsen.

== Sons and daughters of the town as well as prominent inhabitants ==
- Friedrich Adolf Ebert (1791–1834), librarian and bibliographer
- Alfred Lemmnitz (1905–1994), economist and politician (SED)
- Harry Merkel (1918–1995), racing driver and designer
- Horst Bittner (1927–2013), GDR diplomat
- Kessler-Zwillinge (born 1936), spent early childhood here and began ballet lessons
