= Falange Auténtica =

Spanish political party

Authentic Phalanx Falange Auténtica
- President: Antonio Pérez Bencomo
- Founded: April 30, 2002; 24 years ago
- Split from: FE/La Falange
- Headquarters: C/ Tucumán, 9 (Alicante)
- Ideology: National syndicalism Spanish nationalism Republicanism; Falangism; Third Position; Anti-Francoism; Anti-capitalism
- Political position: Far-right
- International affiliation: None

Website
- www.falange-autentica.es

Falange Auténtica (English: Authentic Phalanx, FA) is a Falangist political party in Spain. FA emerged in 2002 as a split from FE/La Falange. FA claims to represent the heritage of the dissolved Falange Española de las JONS (Auténtica) (FE-JONS).

The term 'Authentic' refers to the positioning of FA as 'authentic' as opposed to the official Falange under the rule of Francisco Franco. The second National Chief of the Spanish Falange, Manuel Hedilla (1902–1970), had opposed the forced merger of FE-JONS with the traditionalists. Hedilla who had refused to join the council of the new party and had tried to mobilize his supporters was arrested on 25 April 1937, accused of conspiring against Franco, and condemned to death. However, his sentence was commuted to life in prison on the advice of Ramón Serrano Suñer, Franco's brother-in-law.

FA contested the 2003 municipal election in various parts of the country. It won two seats in El Hoyo de Pinares, Ávila, and one in Ardales, Málaga.

== History ==
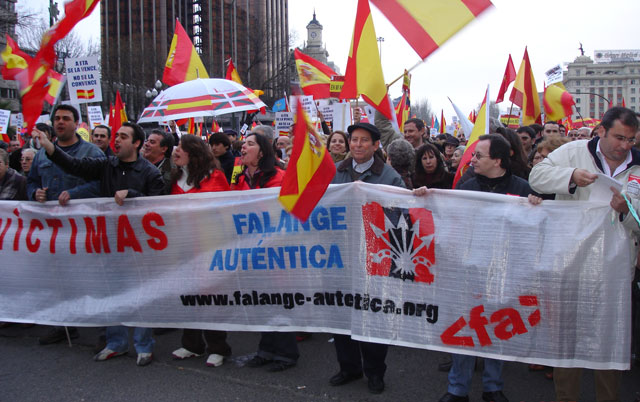
Falange Auténtica supporters at a demonstration of the Ermua Forum against terrorism.

While Falange Auténtica was officially incorporated in the Constituent Congress held in November 2002 in the city of Alicante, it had been operating since April of that year. On that date, an important meeting of the "Phalange National Table" in the town of Viznar, Granada, in which the future actions of the group were defined. The result of one of the decisions made by the attendees, was the launch of a political group under the name Falange Auténtica and the start of the procedures required for public registration. The meeting in Viznar had been called by the aforementioned Phalange National Table. This had appeared in February 2002 when a large group of individual activists and several provincial centers abandoned the direction of FE/La Falange.

Since its founding this political group has participated in several demonstrations against ETA, organised by the AVT in 2006, the Ermua Forum in 2007, and the CCOO and UGT in the same year. Different rallies and public events of Falange Auténtica have had the participation of the likes of sports journalist Jose Antonio Martin Otín, French-Spanish scholar Arnaud Imatz, and writer Fernando Sánchez Dragó.

== Ideology ==
Falange Auténtica proposes the socialization of the economy by taking the trade union as the basis for working life in a way that the people involved in the management of enterprises and the economy through trade unions organized by productive sectors. It rejects capitalism and promotes the strengthening of social protection. They argue that the ownership of the means of production should lead to the collectivization, but not as advocated by Marxists in the ownership of the state, but in the sense of collective ownership of the neighborhood, community or unions. They include the right to a decent life, which not only leads them to reject the death penalty, abortion, torture, racism and euthanasia, but also discrimination based on religion, gender, and sexual orientation. The party is also strongly anti-immigration and advocates for remigration.

They believe that political participation should not be seen only as a right but also a duty of citizens and therefore political participation should not be limited to political parties, but should also actively extended to civic associations, unions and companies.

=== Foreign policy ===
In Argentina, they maintain a close relationship with the Authentic Peronist Movement. While their attention is centered on foreign policy in Latin America, outside of this field they have shown on numerous occasions their sympathy to the Lebanese Kataeb Party.

=== Election results ===
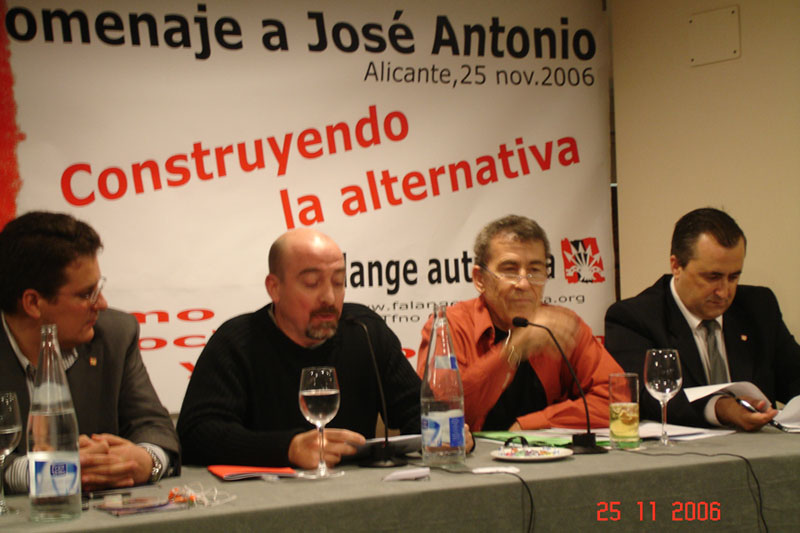
The writer Fernando Sánchez Dragó, at a conference of Falange Auténtica

Their electoral successes have been limited to the municipal level, only ever getting councilors in the municipalities of two small towns: Ardales and El Hoyo de Pinares. These results have been described as "absolutely marginal".

Falange Auténtica was presented to the municipal elections of 2003 in ten municipalities, obtaining two councilors by the Avila town of El Hoyo de Pinares and a councilor for Ardales, Malaga. Under the departments of the party in the town of Avila, the first pilot project Electronic Democracy in Spain was performed.

In the 2007 municipal elections, they presented lists in most municipalities although the results were more modest. They only won two councilors in Ardales, which supported the candidate of the United Left, to access the mayor and thus displace the most votes but without an absolute majority socialist candidate. This provoked enough excitement both in the days before the vote of investiture, as after the outcome. The situation generated some controversy within IU, which threatened with expulsion from the council while it was assumed with apparent ease in the political field of Falange Auténtica.

Falange Auténtica has been submitted to all election calls since its inception, except for the Spanish general elections of 2011, which although initially showed interest in participating, finally did not, as part of the Platform for Constitutional Freedom where they advocated achieving a majority abstention to make way for the opening of a constituent period.

== See also ==
- Falange Española de las JONS (1976)
- Falangism
- Spanish nationalism
