= List of windmills in Saxony =

A list of windmills in the German state of Saxony.

Location	Name of mill	Type	Built	Notes	Photograph
Ablaß-Querbitzsch		Turmholländer		Muehlen Archiv (in German)	
Adelsdorf	Holländermühle Adelsdorf	Turmholländer		Derelict; Muehlen Archiv (in German)	
Altenhain		Turmholländer		House conversion Muehlen Archiv (in German)	
Arnsdorf (Vierkirchen, Saxony)	Windmühle Arnsdorf	Turmholländer		House conversion Muehlen Archiv (in German)	
Arzberg	Wendrichs Bockmühle	Bockwindmühle		Derelict; Muehlen Archiv (in German)	
Arzberg	Beckersche Mühle	Bockwindmühle		Derelict; Muehlen Archiv (in German)	
Audenhain	Ebbecke	Paltrockmühle	1751	Muehlen Archiv (in German)	
Authausen	Bockwindmühle "Ludwig"	Bockwindmühle	1713	Restored; Muehlen Archiv (in German)	
Authausen	Bockwindmühle "Fiehn"	Bockwindmühle	1846	Restored; Muehlen Archiv (in German)	
Bad Lausick-Ballendorf	Ballendorfer Windmühle	Bockwindmühle		Restored; Muehlen Archiv (in German)	
Bad Düben		Bockwindmühle		Restored	
Beilrode	Holländermühle Beilrode	Turmholländer	1830	Muehlen Archiv (in German)	
Bennewitz-Grubnitz	Grubnitzer Holländermühle	Turmholländer		Muehlen Archiv (in German)	
Beucha		Turmholländer		Muehlen Archiv (in German)	
Bischheim-Häslich		Turmholländer		Muehlen Archiv (in German)	
Blankenhain	Kreutzstein-Windmühle	Bockwindmühle	1740	Restored; Muehlen Archiv (in German), location: The Agricultural and Open-Air Museum of Schloss Blankenhain	
Böhlitz		Paltrockmühle / Bockwindmühle		Muehlen Archiv (in German)	
Börln	Holländermühle Börln	Turmholländer		Muehlen Archiv (in German)	
Borna-Zaußwitz	Zaußwitzer Holländermühle	Turmholländer		Muehlen Archiv (in German)	
Boxdorf	Boxdorfer Windmühle	Turmholländer			
Brinnis		Bockwindmühle		Incorporated into engine driven mill Muehlen Archiv (in German)	
Brockwitz		Turmholländer			
Brockwitz		Turmholländer			
Burkartshain-Nitzschka		Turmholländer		Stump only Muehlen Archiv (in German)	
Casabra		Turmholländer		Muehlen Archiv (in German)	
Clanzschwitz	Windmühle Clanzschwitz	Bockwindmühle		Muehlen Archiv (in German)	
Collm		Bockwindmühle		Muehlen Archiv (in German)	
Collmen	Paltrockmühle Collmen	Bockwindmühlet		Muehlen Archiv (in German)	
Dahlen-Kleinböhla	Vorsdorfmühle	Turmholländer		House conversion Muehlen Archiv (in German)	
Dobernitz	Holländermühle Dobernitz	Turmholländer			
Doberschütz	Holländermühle Doberschütz	Turmholländer		House conversion Muehlen Archiv (in German)	
Döbeln	Holländermühle Döbeln	Turmholländer			
Döbrichau	Döbrichauer Paltrockmühle	Paltrockmühle		Muehlen Archiv (in German)	
Dölzig		Bockwindmühle		House conversion Muehlen Archiv (in German)	
Dresden-Gohlis	Gohliser Windmühle	Turmholländer		Muehlen Archiv (in German)	
Dresden-Leutewitz	Leutewitzer Windmühle	Turmholländer	1839	Muehlen Archiv (in German)	
Dresden-Mickten	Micktner Windmühle	Turmholländer		Muehlen Archiv (in German)	
Ebersbach	Ebersbacher Windmühle	Bockwindmühle		Restored; Muehlen Archiv (in German)	
Ebersbach	Ebersbacher Windmühle	Bockwindmühle	1859	Muehlen Archiv (in German)	
Eilenburg	Bechers Mühle	Turmholländer	1868	Muehlen Archiv (in German)	
Freiroda		Bockwindmühle		Muehlen Archiv (in German)	
Freiroda		Bockwindmühle		House conversion Muehlen Archiv (in German)	
Fuchshain	Fuchshainer Paltrockmühle	Paltrockmühle	1927 (re-built)	Muehlen Archiv (in German)	
Fuchshain	Fuchshainer Windmühle	Bockwindmühle		Muehlen Archiv (in German)	
Gallschütz		Bockwindmühle		Trestle and collapsed remains Muehlen Archiv (in German)	
Gerbisdorf	Windmühle Gerbisdorf	Bockwindmühle		Derelict; Muehlen Archiv (in German)	
Geringswalde		Turmholländer		Incorporated into engine driven mill Muehlen Archiv (in German)	
Gersdorf	Paltrockmühle Gersdorf	Paltrockmühle		Muehlen Archiv (in German)	
Gersdorf	Hustemühle Gersdorf	Turmholländer		Muehlen Archiv (in German)	
Glaubitz		Turmholländer		Muehlen Archiv (in German)	
Glaucha	Bockwindmühle Wolkwitz	Bockwindmühle	1748/49	Restored; Muehlen Archiv (in German)	
Glesien	Voßmühle Glesien	Bockwindmühle		Derelict; Muehlen Archiv (in German)	
Großbardau		Turmholländer		Muehlen Archiv (in German)	
Großbothen-Schönbach		Turmholländer		Muehlen Archiv (in German)	
Großbuch		Turmholländer			
Großdobritz	Windmühle Großdobritz	Turmholländer	1899	Muehlen Archiv (in German)	
Großgrabe		Turmholländer		Stump; Muehlen Archiv (in German)	
Großpösna-Seifertshain		Paltrockmühle		Muehlen Archiv (in German)	
Großtreben	Holländermühle Großtreben	Turmholländer		Muehlen Archiv (in German)	
Großwig	Hübner's Mühle	Bockwindmühle	1847	Restored; Muehlen Archiv (in German)	
Hartha-Wallbach	Holländermühle Wallbach	Turmholländer		Muehlen Archiv (in German)	
Hohenroda	Windmühle Hohenroda	Bockwindmühle		Derelict; Muehlen Archiv (in German)	
Holzhausen		Bockwindmühle		Muehlen Archiv (in German)	
Dörgenhausen, Hoyerswerda	Windmühle Dörgenhausen	Bockwindmühle		Restored; Muehlen Archiv (in German)	
Jesewitz-Gallen	Eckard Mühle Gallen	Paltrockmühle		House conversion Muehlen Archiv (in German)	
Bernbruch, Kamenz	Holländermühle Bernbruch	Turmholländer		Stump; Muehlen Archiv (in German)	
Klinga		Paltrockmühle		Muehlen Archiv (in German)	
Klingewalde		Turmholländer		Derelict	
Klitschmar-Peterwitz	Windmühle Peterwitz	Bockwindmühle	1890	Muehlen Archiv (in German)	
Knauthain		Turmholländer			
Knautnaundorf		Turmholländer		Stump; Muehlen Archiv (in German)	
Kobershain	Kobershainer Windmühle	Bockwindmühle		Muehlen Archiv (in German)	
Königshain		Turmholländer		restored	
Kottmarsdorf	Burkmühle Kottmarsdorf	Bockwindmühle	1843	Restored; Muehlen Archiv (in German)	
Krippehna	Kuhne Mühle Krippehna	Bockwindmühle		Trestle only Muehlen Archiv (in German)	
Kupsal		Turmholländer		House conversion Muehlen Archiv (in German)	
Kühnitzsch	Kühnitzscher Windmühle	Bockwindmühle		Restored; Muehlen Archiv (in German)	
Kyhna	Paltrockwindmühle Kyhna	Paltrockmühle	1825	Restored; Muehlen Archiv (in German)	
Langenreichenbach	Langenreichenbacher Bockmühle	Bockwindmühle		Derelict; Muehlen Archiv (in German)	
Laußig	Windmühle Laußig	Bockwindmühle		Trestle only Muehlen Archiv (in German)	
Leipzig-Göbschelwitz		Bockwindmühle		Derelict; Muehlen Archiv (in German)	
Hartmannsdorf, Leipzig		Turmholländer		Muehlen Archiv (in German)	
Leutersdorf-Hetzwalde	Hetzemühle	Bockwindmühle		Five sails Muehlen Archiv (in German)	
Liebschütz	Liebschützer Windmühle	Bockwindmühle		Restored; Muehlen Archiv (in German)	
Liemehna	Holländermühle Liemehna	Turmholländer		Muehlen Archiv (in German)	
Lindennaundorf		Bockwindmühle		Muehlen Archiv (in German)	
Lindenhayn	Windmühle Lindenhayn	Bockwindmühle		House conversion Muehlen Archiv (in German)	
Lindenthal	Holländermühle Lindenthal	Turmholländer	1892	Muehlen Archiv (in German)	
Löbnitz	Bockwindmühle "Döbler" Löbnitz	Bockwindmühle	1760	Restored; Muehlen Archiv (in German) Wikimedia Commons	
Loßwig		Bockwindmühle		Incorporated into engine driven mill Muehlen Archiv (in German)	
Luga	Lugaer Windmühle	Bockwindmühle	1733	Restored; Muehlen Archiv (in German)	
Luppa	Webersche Windmühle Luppa	Bockwindmühle		Restored; Muehlen Archiv (in German)	
Maltitz	Holländermühle Maltitz	Turmholländer			
Markranstädt		Turmholländer		Stump; Muehlen Archiv (in German)	
Markranstädt-Göhrenz		Turmholländer		House conversion Muehlen Archiv (in German)	
Mehderitzsch		Turmholländer		Incorporated into engine driven mill Muehlen Archiv (in German)	
Meltewitz		Turmholländer		House conversion Muehlen Archiv (in German)	
Mocherwitz		Bockwindmühle		Restored; Muehlen Archiv (in German)	
Mockritz		Bockwindmühle		Derelict; Muehlen Archiv (in German)	
Mockrehna		Turmholländer		Muehlen Archiv (in German)	
Moritzburg		Turmholländer		House conversion Muehlen Archiv (in German)	
Mutzschen-Prösitz	Prösitzer Windmühle	Bockwindmühle		Muehlen Archiv (in German)	
Naundorf		Turmholländer		Muehlen Archiv (in German)	
Naunhof		Turmholländer		Muehlen Archiv (in German)	
Neiden		Bockwindmühle		Derelict; Muehlen Archiv (in German)	
Nerchau-Cannewitz		Turmholländer		Stump; Muehlen Archiv (in German)	
Nerchau-Fremdiswalde	Holländermühle Fremdiswalde	Turmholländer		Muehlen Archiv (in German)	
Neueibau		Bockwindmühle		Five sails Muehlen Archiv (in German)	
Neundorf auf dem Eigen, Herrnhut		Bockwindmühle		Muehlen Archiv (in German)	
Niederau		Turmholländer			
Moholz, Niesky	Windmühle See-Moholz	Bockwindmühle		Miniature mill Muehlen Archiv (in German)	
Nünchritz-Grödel		Turmholländer		House conversion Muehlen Archiv (in German)	
Oberoderwitz		Bockwindmühle		Muehlen Archiv (in German)	
Oberoderwitz		Turmholländer		Muehlen Archiv (in German)	
Oberoderwitz		Bockwindmühle		Muehlen Archiv (in German)	
Oberoderwitz		Bockwindmühle		Muehlen Archiv (in German)	
Oberseifersdorf	Donix-Windmühle Oberseifersdorf	Bockwindmühle		Incorporated into engine driven mill Muehlen Archiv (in German)	
Oehna	Oehnaer Paltrockmühle	Paltrockmühle		Base only Muehlen Archiv (in German)	
Pahrenz		Turmholländer		Muehlen Archiv (in German)	
Paschwitz		Turmholländer		Restored; Muehlen Archiv (in German)	
Pommritz	Pommritzer Holländermühle	Turmholländer		Muehlen Archiv (in German)	
Possendorf	Posendorfer Windmühle	Turmholländer		Muehlen Archiv (in German)	
Prausitz		Turmholländer		Stump; Muehlen Archiv (in German)	
Pristäblich		Turmholländer		House conversion, stump Muehlen Archiv (in German)	
Probsthain	Probsthainer Windmühle	Bockwindmühle		Muehlen Archiv (in German)	
Püchau		Turmholländer		House conversion Muehlen Archiv (in German)	
Reibitz		Bockwindmühle		Restored; Muehlen Archiv (in German)	
Reichenbach	Windmühle auf dem Töpferberg	Turmholländer		Stump; Muehlen Archiv (in German)	
Reichstädt	Windmühle Reichstädt	Turmholländer		Muehlen Archiv (in German)	
Reitzendorf		Turmholländer		Muehlen Archiv (in German)	
Rodewitz	Rodewitzer Holländermühle	Turmholländer		Muehlen Archiv (in German)	
Röcknitz		Bockwindmühle			
Röderau-Moritz		Turmholländer		Muehlen Archiv (in German)	
Roitzschjora		Bockwindmühle		Derelict; Muehlen Archiv (in German)	
Rücknitz		Bockwindmühle		Derelict; Muehlen Archiv (in German)	
Sachsendorf		Turmholländer		Muehlen Archiv (in German)	
Schänitz		Turmholländer			
Scharfenberg-Pegenau		Turmholländer		Muehlen Archiv (in German)	
Schildau		Bockwindmühle		Derelict; Muehlen Archiv (in German)	
Schkeuditz		Bockwindmühle		Muehlen Archiv (in German)	
Schkortitz		Paltrockmühle			
Schmannewitz		Bockwindmühle		Restored; Muehlen Archiv (in German)	
Schönberg-Tettau		Turmholländer		Muehlen Archiv (in German)	
Schönborn		Turmholländer		Muehlen Archiv (in German)	
Schorlop-Schkeitbar		Bockwindmühle		Derelict; Muehlen Archiv (in German)	
Selben		Bockwindmühle		Muehlen Archiv (in German)	
Sitzenroda	Holländermühle Sitzenroda	Turmholländer		House Conversion; Muehlen Archiv (in German)	
Sohland am Rotstein	Bachmannwindmühle Sohland a. Rotstein	Bockwindmühle		Restored; Muehlen Archiv (in German)	
Sohland am Rothstein	Windmühle am Mittelgut	Turmholländer		Restored; Muehlen Archiv (in German)	
Staupitz	Staupitzer Windmühle	Bockwindmühle		Muehlen Archiv (in German)	
Straßgräbchen		Turmholländer		House conversion	
Strehla	Windmühle Strehla	Turmholländer		Muehlen Archiv (in German)	
Strehla-Kleinrügeln	Windmühle Kleinrügeln	Paltrockmühle		Muehlen Archiv (in German)	
Strelln	Strellner Windmühle	Bockwindmühle		Derelict; Muehlen Archiv (in German)	
Syrau	Syrauer Holländermühle	Turmholländer	1887	Muehlen Archiv (in German)	
Taucha		Bockwindmühle		Restored; Muehlen Archiv (in German)	
Taucha-Merkwitz		Bockwindmühle		Muehlen Archiv (in German)	
Tautenhain		Bockwindmühle		Muehlen Archiv (in German)	
Thallwitz-Canitz	Canitzer Holländermühle	Turmholländer		Muehlen Archiv (in German)	
Thammenhain-Voigtshain	Voigtshainer Holländermühle	Turmholländer		Muehlen Archiv (in German)	
Thümmlitzwalde-Nauberg	Nauberger Holländermühle	Turmholländer		Muehlen Archiv (in German)	
Tiefensee		Bockwindmühle		Restored; Muehlen Archiv (in German)	
Weinböhla		Turmholländer			
Weißig		Turmholländer		Muehlen Archiv (in German)	
Weßnitz		Turmholländer		Muehlen Archiv (in German)	
Wiesenena		Bockwindmühle		Derelict; Muehlen Archiv (in German)	
Wildenhain		Bockwindmühle		Remains only Muehlen Archiv (in German)	
Wilsdruff-Kaufbach	Windmühle Kaufbach	Turmholländer		Muehlen Archiv (in German)	
Wohla	Holländermühle Wohla	Erdholländer		Derelict; Muehlen Archiv (in German)	
Wöllmen		Bockwindmühle		Derelict; Muehlen Archiv (in German)	
Wurzen-Dehnitz		Turmholländer		Derelict; Muehlen Archiv (in German)	
Wurzen-Roitzsch		Paltrockmühle		Muehlen Archiv (in German)	
Zeuckritz	Zeuckritzer Windmühle	Bockwindmühle		Muehlen Archiv (in German)	
Zottewitz		Turmholländer		Muehlen Archiv (in German)	
Zschepa	Windmühle Zschepa	Bockwindmühle	1852	Muehlen Archiv (in German)	
Zschepa-Lorenzkirch		Turmholländer		Stump; Muehlen Archiv (in German)	
Zschepplin	Motormühle Zschepplin	Paltrockmühle		Incorporated into engine driven mill Muehlen Archiv (in German)	
Zwethau		Bockwindmühle		Derelict; Muehlen Archiv (in German)	
Zwochau	Döblermühle Zwochau	Bockwindmühle		Derelict; Muehlen Archiv (in German)	
Zwochau	Zwochauer Bockwindmühle	Bockwindmühle	1806		
