= Peißen station =

Railway station in Germany

Peißen
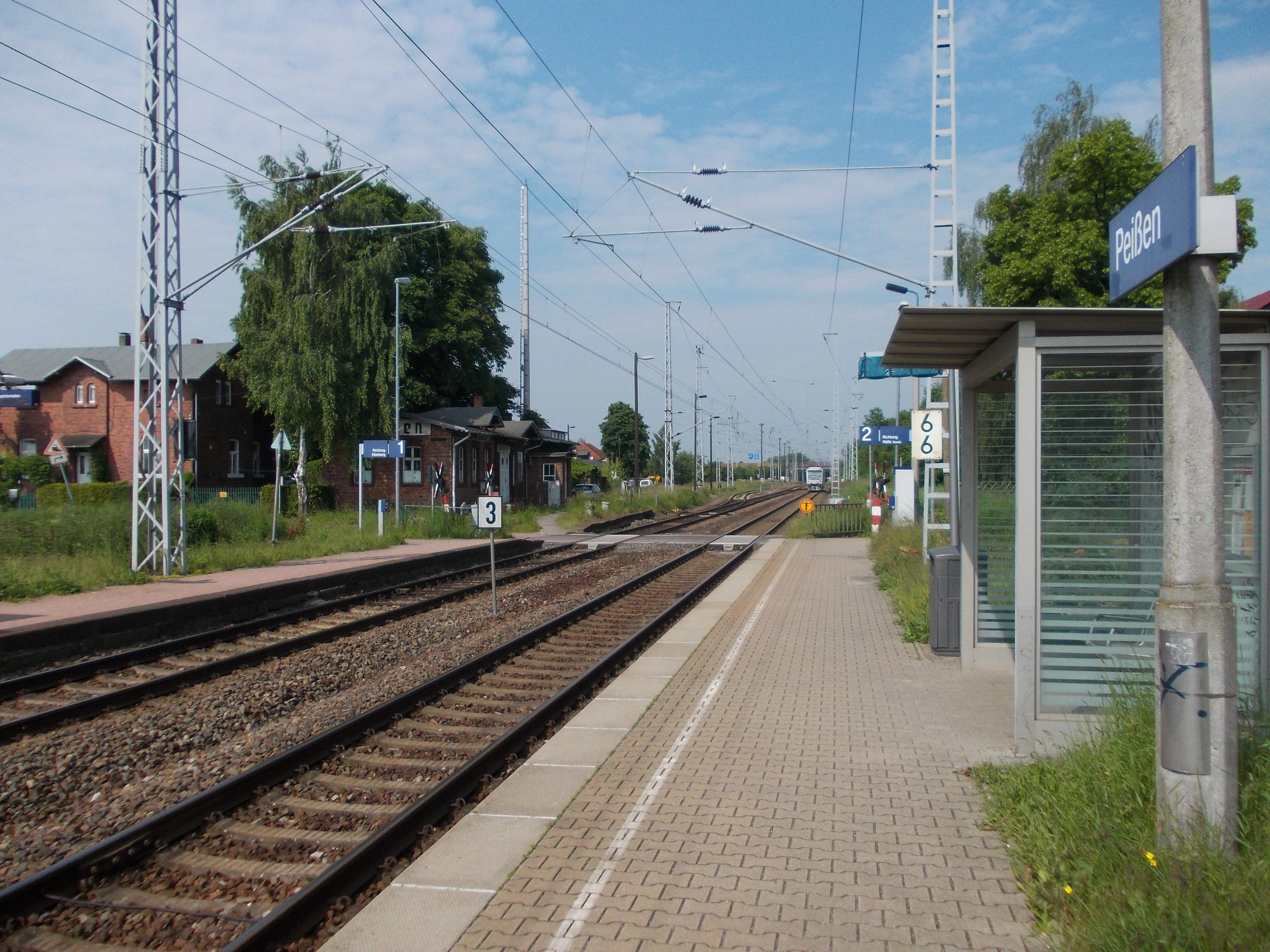
- 2013

General information
- Location: Lindenring; 06188 Peißen; Saxony-Anhalt; Germany
- Coordinates: 51.501°N 12.060°E
- System: Hp
- Owner: Deutsche Bahn
- Operator: DB Netz; DB Station&Service
- Lines: Halle–Cottbus railway (KBS 219)
- Platforms: 2 side platforms
- Tracks: 2
- Train operators: S-Bahn Mitteldeutschland
- Connections: S 9

Construction
- Parking: no
- Cycle facilities: no
- Accessible: yes

Other information
- Station code: 4887
- DS100 code: LPE
- IBNR: 8012619
- Category: 6
- Fare zone: MDV: 224
- Website: www.bahnhof.de

Services
Preceding station	Mitteldeutschland S-Bahn	Following station
Halle (Saale) Hbf Terminus	S 9	Reußen towards Eilenburg
Location
- Location within Saxony-Anhalt Location within Germany Location within Europe

Peißen station (German: Haltepunkt Peißen) is a railway station in the municipality of Peißen, located in the Saalekreis district in Saxony-Anhalt, Germany.
