= Adelsdorf =

Adelsdorf may refer to:

- Adelsdorf, Bavaria
- Adelsdorf, Saxony; see List of windmills in Saxony
- Zagrodno (Adelsdorf), in Lower Silesia
