= Prince Wilhelm Victor of Prussia =

German nobleman, soldier, and diplomat (1919–1989)

- Born: 15 February 1919; Kiel, Schleswig-Holstein, Weimar Republic
- Died: 7 February 1989 (aged 69); Donaueschingen, Baden-Württemberg, West Germany
- Burial: 11 February 1989; Nordfriedhof, Munich, Germany
- Spouse: Countess Marie Antoinette of Hoyos-Stichsenstein (m. 1944)
- Issue: Princess Marie Louise, Countess of Schönburg-Glauchau; Prince Adalbert Alexander Friedrich of Prussia
Names
- German: Wilhelm Viktor Ernst Freund Friedrich Georg Adalbert
- House: Hohenzollern
- Father: Prince Adalbert of Prussia
- Mother: Princess Adelaide of Saxe-Meiningen

Prince Wilhelm Victor of Prussia (German: Wilhelm Viktor Ernst Freund Friedrich Georg Adalbert; 15 February 1919 – 7 February 1989) was a German royal, soldier and diplomat.

== Life ==
Prince Wilhelm Victor was a grandson of Emperor Wilhelm II and the youngest child of Prince Adalbert of Prussia (1884–1948) and Princess Adelheid "Adi" of Saxe-Meiningen (1891–1971). His father, Prince Adalbert carried also the title "Graf von Lingen". He forfeited his rights of succession as a result of his unequal marriage. His only surviving sister, Princess Viktoria Marina (1917–1981) married Kirby William Patterson (1907–1984).

Imperial Coat of Arms of the House of Hohenzollern

== Marriage ==
Prince Wilhelm Victor married at Donaueschingen 20 July 1944 Marie Antoinette, Countess of Hoyos-Stichsenstein (Hohenthurm, 27 June 1920 – Marbella 1 March 2004), daughter of Friedrich, Count of Hoyos-Stichsenstein (1876–1951) and Countess Wilhelmine von Wuthenau-Hohenthurm (1895–1983), niece of Sophie, Duchess of Hohenberg. They had the following issue:

- Princess Marie Louise Marina Franziska of Prussia (b. 18 September 1945) she married Count Rudolf (Rudi) of Schönburg-Glauchau (1932-2026) on 19 May 1971. They have two children:
  - Countess Sophie Anastasia Wilhelmine Marie Antoinette of Schönburg-Glauchau (b. 17 May 1979) she married Carles Andreu Alacreu on 21 September 2013 in Ronda. They have two children:
    - Rudi Federico Nicolás Alacreu y Schönburg-Glauchau (b. 12 September 2017)
    - Carlota Alacreu y Schönburg-Glauchau (b. 6 May 2019)
  - Count Friedrich Wilhelm Simeon Dionysius Joachim Rudolf Maria Adelbert of Schönburg-Glauchau (b. 27 April 1985); he married Amanda Lange on 13 June 2026 in Madrid.
- Prince Adalbert Alexander Friedrich Joachim Christian (born Konstanz 4 March 1948), who married at Glentorf 14 June 1981 Eva Maria Kudicke (born Shahi, Iran 30 June 1951); They have three sons:
  - Prince Alexander Friedrich Wilhelm-Viktor Marcus of Prussia (b. 3 October 1984), he married Jenny von Rumohr (b. 15 December 1985) on 14 February 2020.
  - Prince Christian Friedrich Wilhelm Johannes of Prussia (b. 3 July 1986)
  - Prince Philipp Heinrich Adalbert Günther of Prussia (b. 3 July 1986), he married Aline von Alvensleben on 27 September 2024, descendant of Count Albrecht von Alvensleben-Schönborn (1848–1928)
    - Princess Coralie of Prussia (b. 2025)

== Death ==
Prince Wilhelm Viktor died on 7 February 1989 at age 69. He is buried alongside his wife in Nordfriedhof, Munich, Germany.

== Bibliography ==
- Marlene A. Eilers, Queen Victoria's Descendants (Baltimore, Maryland: Genealogical Publishing Co., 1987), page 155. Hereinafter cited as Queen Victoria's Descendants.
- C. Arnold McNaughton, The Book of Kings: A Royal Genealogy, in 3 volumes (London, U.K.: Garnstone Press, 1973), volume 1, page 59. Hereinafter cited as The Book of King.
- Karin Feuerstein-Praßer: Die Deutschen Kaiserinnen 1871–1918, Piper Verlag 2002.
- John C. G. Röhl: The Kaiser and his court. Wilhelm II and the government of Germany. Cambridge University Press, Cambridge 1994.
- John C. G. Röhl: Wilhelm II., C. H. Beck, München 1993–2008.
