= Landsberg (b Halle/Saale) Süd station =

Railway station in Saxony-Anhalt, Germany

Landsberg (b Halle/Saale) Süd
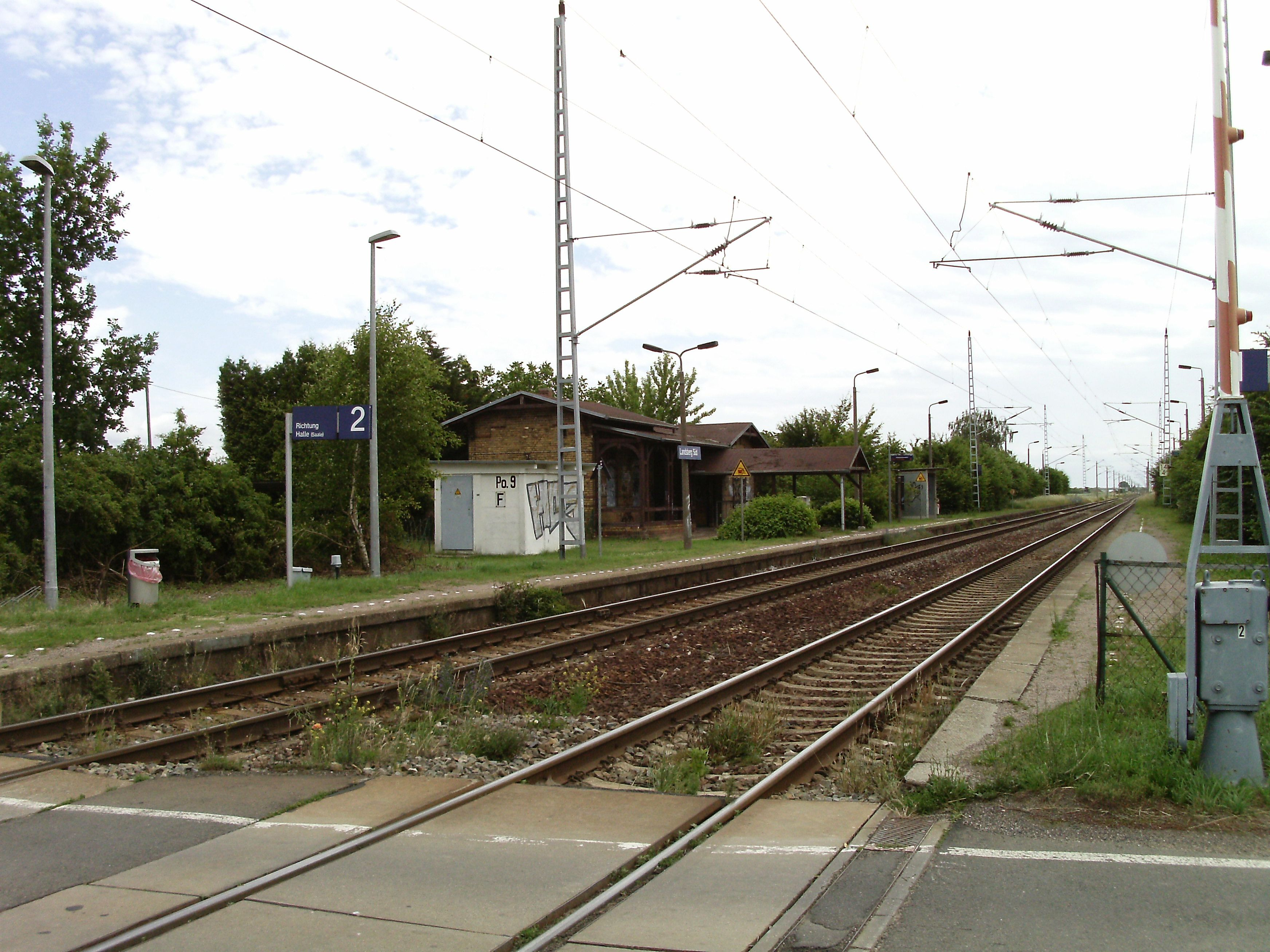
- 2012

General information
- Location: August-Bebel-Straße; 06188 Landsberg; Saxony-Anhalt; Germany
- Coordinates: 51.505°N 12.172°E
- System: Hp
- Owner: Deutsche Bahn
- Operator: DB Station&Service
- Lines: Halle–Cottbus railway (KBS 219)
- Platforms: 2 side platforms
- Tracks: 2
- Train operators: S-Bahn Mitteldeutschland
- Connections: S 9

Construction
- Parking: no
- Cycle facilities: no
- Accessible: yes

Other information
- Station code: 3508
- DS100 code: LLAS
- IBNR: 8012148
- Category: 6
- Fare zone: MDV: 224
- Website: www.bahnhof.de

Services
Preceding station	Mitteldeutschland S-Bahn	Following station
Reußen towards Halle (Saale) Hbf	S 9	Klitschmar towards Eilenburg
Location
- Location within Saxony-Anhalt Location within Germany Location within Europe

Landsberg (b Halle/Saale) Süd station (German: Haltepunkt Landsberg (b Halle/Saale) Süd) is a railway station in the municipality of Landsberg, located in the Saalekreis district in Saxony-Anhalt, Germany.
