= Franz Evers =

German publisher

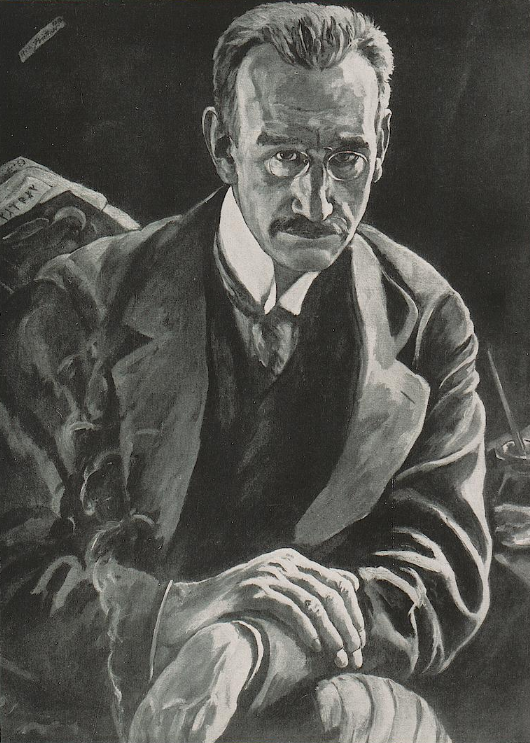
Franz Evers (1916)

Franz Evers (10 July 1871 – 14 September 1947) was first a bookseller and from 1889, editor of the monthly journal Litterarische Blätter.

== Life ==
Evers was born in Winsen an der Luhe. In 1892, together with Carl Hermann Busse, G. E. Geilfus (Georg Edward), Victor Hardung and Julius Vanselow (1868-1892), he published the anthology Symphonie. He met the theosophist Wilhelm Hübbe-Schleiden. Afterwards he worked as an editor of the theosophical journal Sphinx and was a freelance writer from 1894. He shared a studio with Fidus, who illustrated his Hohe Lieder.

He succeeded in placing some poems, both by Julius and Carl Vanselow, in the journal Sphinx in the 1893/1894 volumes, which published hardly any poetry before and after that. Possibly also by other members of his circle. There are three poems and a tale by Evers in volume 15 and three poems in volume 16. In volume 17 (1893), there are four prose texts and three poems. In this volume there are also abundant "art supplements" by Fidus and Karl Wilhelm Diefenbach, but these became increasingly sparse. He translated Paul Verlaine.

Evers died in Niemberg at the age of 76.

== Work ==
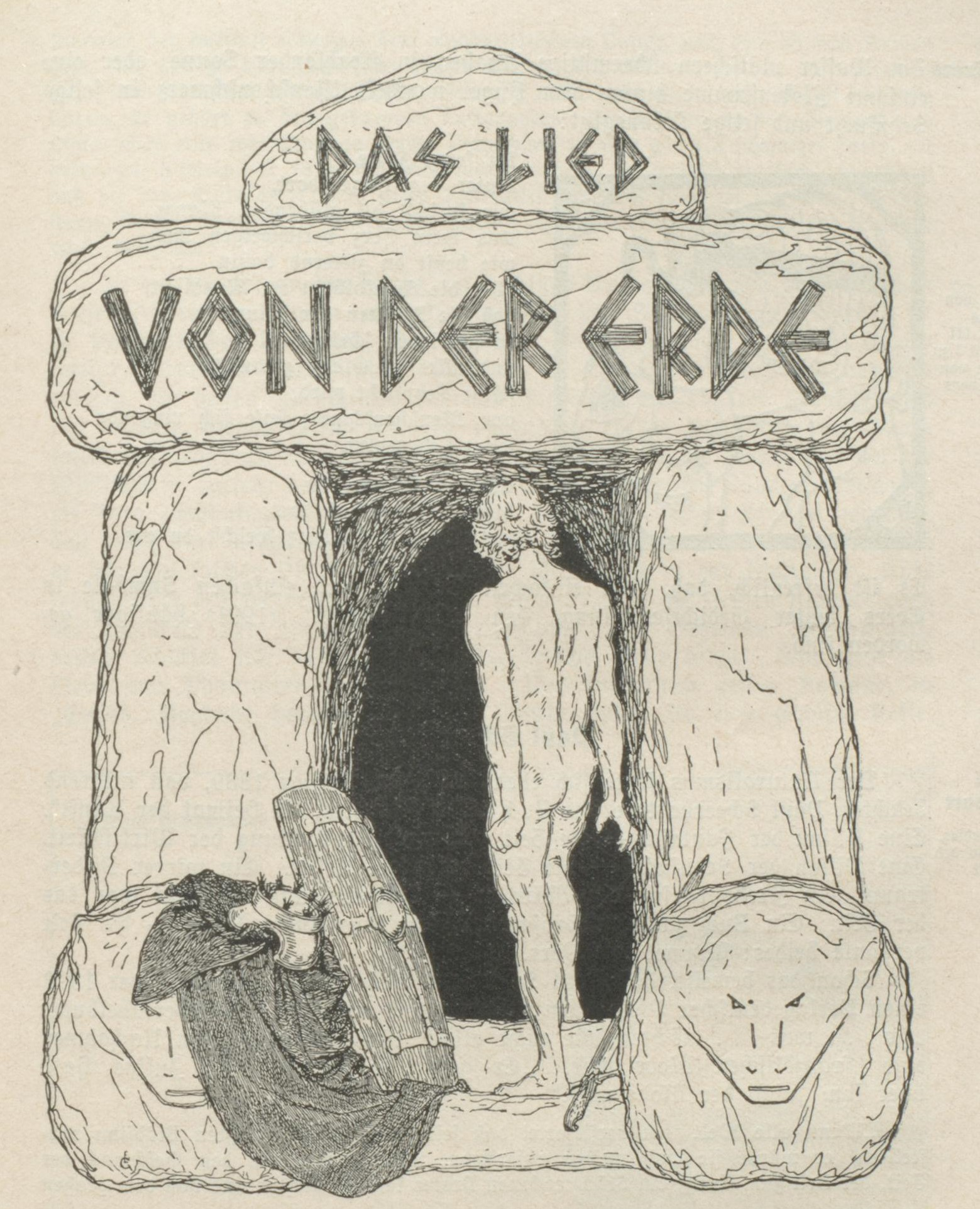
Fidus: Illustration for Hohe Lieder (1896)

- Symphonie: Ein Gedichtbuch von Carl Busse, Franz Evers, Georg E. Geilfus, Victor Hardung, Julius Vanselow. München. M. Poessl. 1892. 199 S.
- Fundamente. Poems. Leipzig 1893. With picture decorations by Fidus.
- Deutsche Lieder. Berlin 1895.
- Königslieder. Leipzig 1895.
- Hohe Lieder. Berlin 1896. With picture decorations by Fidus.
- Paradiese. Leipzig 1897.
- Der Halbgott. Poems. Leipzig 1900.
- Erntelieder. Leipzig 1901.
- Nachtwandel der Liebe. Leipzig 1911.
