= Prince Adalbert of Prussia =

- Prince Adalbert of Prussia (1884–1948)
- Prince Adalbert of Prussia (1811–1873)
