= Klitschmar station =

Railway station in Germany

Klitschmar
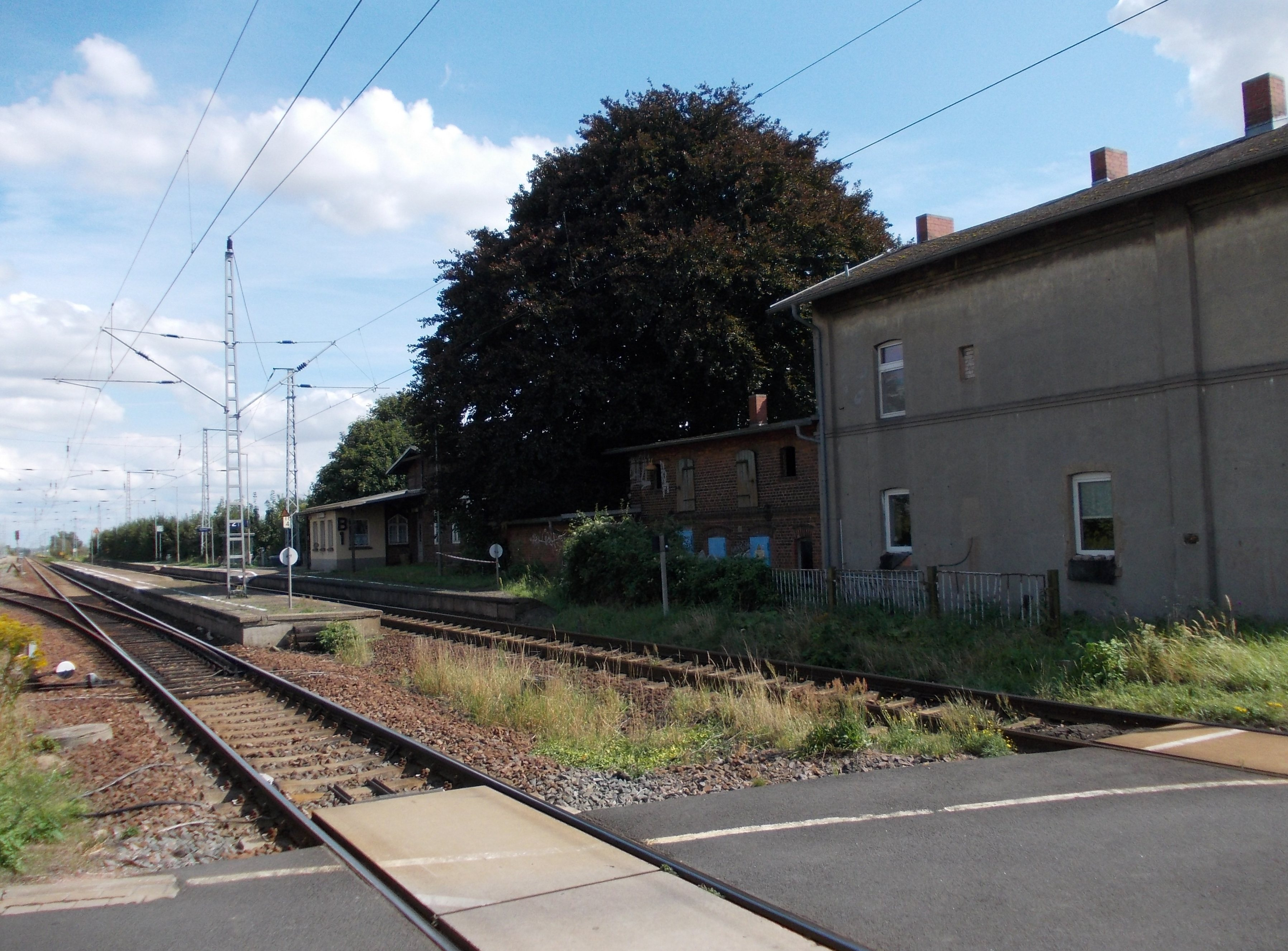
- 2012

General information
- Location: Am Bahnhof; 04509 Klitschmar; Saxony; Germany
- Coordinates: 51.508°N 12.229°E
- System: Hp
- Owner: Deutsche Bahn
- Operator: DB Station&Service
- Lines: Halle–Cottbus railway (KBS 219)
- Platforms: 2 side platforms
- Tracks: 2
- Train operators: S-Bahn Mitteldeutschland
- Connections: S 9

Construction
- Parking: no
- Cycle facilities: no
- Accessible: yes

Other information
- Station code: 3275
- DS100 code: LKLM
- IBNR: 8012046
- Category: 6
- Fare zone: MDV: 163
- Website: www.bahnhof.de

Services
Preceding station	Mitteldeutschland S-Bahn	Following station
Landsberg (b Halle/Saale) Süd towards Halle (Saale) Hbf	S 9	Kyhna towards Eilenburg
Location
- Location within Saxony Location within Germany Location within Europe

Klitschmar station (German: Haltepunkt Klitschmar) is a railway station in the municipality of Klitschmar, located in the Nordsachsen district in Saxony, Germany.
