= Norman Volker Franz =

German murderer

Norman Volker Franz (born 30 January 1970 in Neheim-Hüsten, West Germany) is a German murderer and fugitive who is being sought after by international arrest warrant.

== Early life ==
After secondary school, he was an electrician's apprentice and wanted to catch up in Dortmund with his high school diploma. He was described as "an unobtrusive student" by one teacher. Franz finished school half a year before graduation.

== Crimes ==
Norman Volker Franz belonged to a gang of criminals who attacked banks, smuggled cigarettes, traded weapons and maintained contacts with pimps. When gang boss Christian K. was blackmailed by three rival Polish cigarette smugglers, he ordered Franz and three other men to kill the Poles. In May 1995, K. lured the three extortionists on a deserted street near the Syburg district of Dortmund. Franz stopped the Poles' car and asked them to turn down the window, because he had to discuss something briefly. Then he threw a hand grenade into the vehicle. One of the men was killed instantly, and another was seriously injured but attempted to escape, but was caught by Franz and his accomplices and shot several times in the head. The third man escaped, although they followed him in Franz's BMW, from whose windows they shot him with a pump action, seriously injuring him.

After this, Franz tried to flee with his girlfriend Sandra from the Netherlands, Belgium, France, Spain and then to Portugal, but was arrested at a toll in France and transferred to Germany. The Dortmund jury sentenced him in March 1996 for two murders to life imprisonment and was transferred to the Hagen Prison. In May 1996, he married his girlfriend in prison. On 11 March 1997, he sawed through the window bars of his cell, climbed onto the roof with a ladder made of bucket handles and broomsticks, and slid down the gutter. He jumped into a red Volkswagen Polo, where his wife had been waiting for him, and fled.

On 26 March 1997, Franz shot the security guard Rudolf Tamm, who had brought a cash box with 10,000 Deutsche Mark to a safe in the Dresdner Bank in Weimar. He grabbed the cash box and fled on foot with his wife, who had stood guard in front of the bank. On 21 July 1997, Franz shot and killed two guards, Gerd Koch and Peter Seidel, who were about to stow the weekend income in the amount of half a million Deutsche Mark in an armoured car behind the Metromarkt in Peißen near Halle.

== Arrest ==
On 24 October 1998, Franz and his wife were arrested in a Portuguese apartment in Albufeira by German investigators. Portuguese policemen in Algarve were aware of a BMW with a German license plate, which was suspiciously parked in front of a bank. The police checked the license plate and found out that the car had been purchased under a pseudonym and that the wanted murderer Norman Volker Franz had used it more often. The two fugitives made no resistance and came into Portuguese custody peacefully.

== Renewed flight ==
After Franz had filed an unsuccessful complaint against his extradition to the German authorities before the Portuguese Constitutional Court, on 28 July 1999 he escaped successfully from the central prison of Lisbon. He had cut through the window grill and roped off with sheets. Since his escape, the authorities have been looking in vain for the perpetrator. His wife, who was sentenced to a six-year and three-year juvenile fine in Portuguese custody by the Halle court, has since divorced him.

For the arrest of Norman Volker Franz, there are currently rewards totaling around €100,000 from several institutions and authorities. According to the BKA, Franz is thought to be staying abroad, as there have been sightings of him. The police concentrate on such leads. As part of the Infra-Red since June 2010, Interpol seeks worldwide using witnesses and by visiting the various Internet platforms specifically for violent criminals, including Norman Volker Franz.

In ZDF documentary in August 2007, various police officers speculated that he could still be in Portugal or that he had contacts in Morocco and possibly was there. Investigators assume that Franz is staying in areas not frequented by many Germans and had broken off contacts with all family members and friends from the past. Public prosecutor Klaus Wiechmann from Halle told Bild.de in the summer of 2009 that he was sure, sooner or later, that Franz would be captured if still alive and investigators would still search for him. According to the same report, the BKA had no indications that Franz had committed further violent crimes since his 1999 escape. The public prosecutor's office in Dortmund announced that the Landeskriminalant Nordrhein-Westfalen had carried out a covert search and still followed up clues on Franz's location. On 28 February 2018, a voice sample from a phone call recording was broadcast in the ZDF program Aktenzeichen XY… ungelöst.
