= Kyhna station =

German rail station

Kyhna
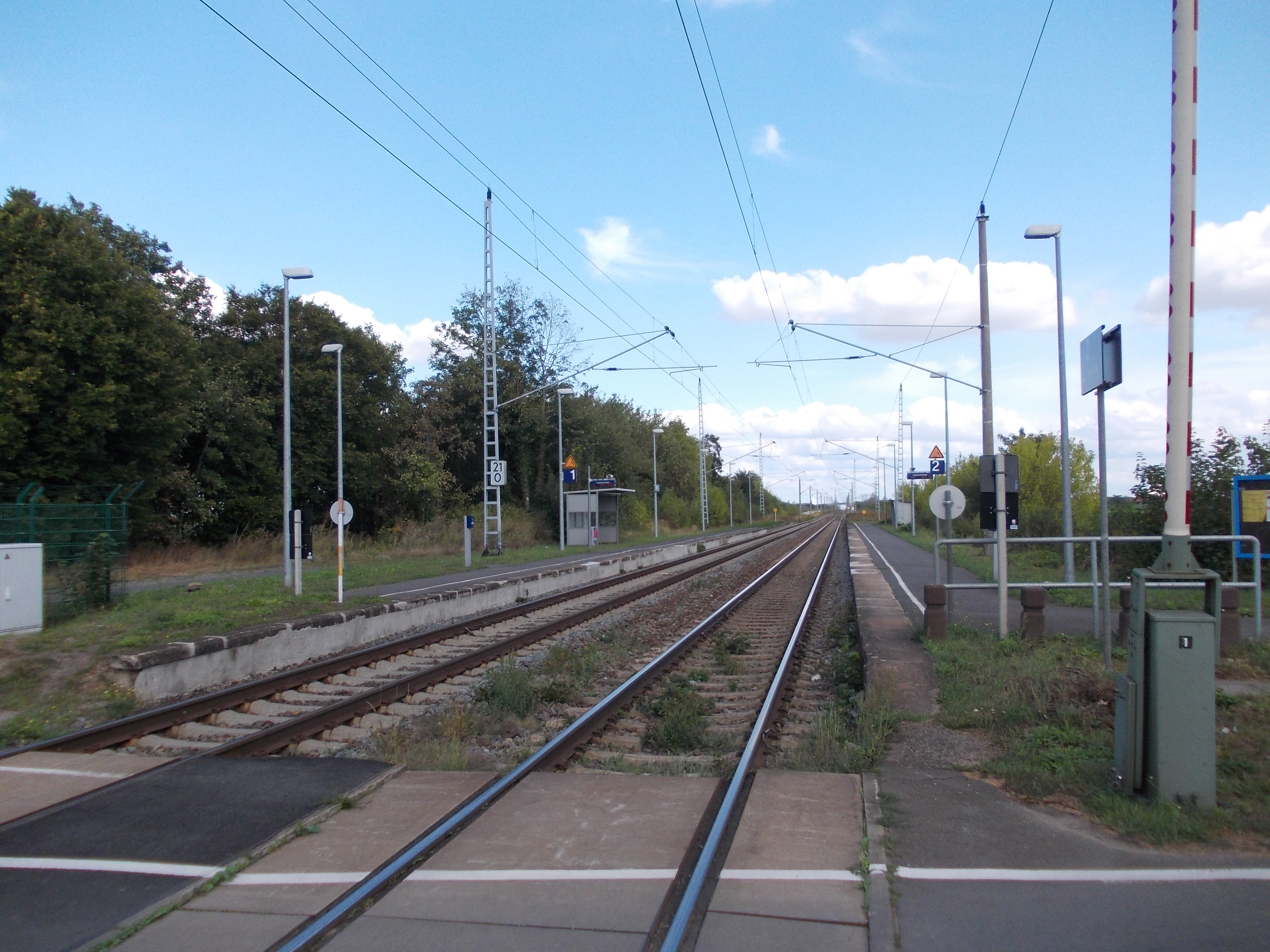
- 2012

General information
- Location: Zu Voigts Mühle/Queringer Straße; 04509 Kyhna; Saxony; Germany
- Coordinates: 51.511°N 12.266°E
- System: Hp
- Owner: Deutsche Bahn
- Operator: DB Station&Service
- Lines: Halle–Cottbus railway (KBS 219)
- Platforms: 2 side platforms
- Tracks: 2
- Train operators: S-Bahn Mitteldeutschland
- Connections: S 9

Construction
- Parking: no
- Cycle facilities: no
- Accessible: yes

Other information
- Station code: 3481
- DS100 code: LKYA
- IBNR: 8012141
- Category: 6
- Fare zone: MDV: 163
- Website: www.bahnhof.de

Services
Preceding station	Mitteldeutschland S-Bahn	Following station
Klitschmar towards Halle (Saale) Hbf	S 9	Delitzsch ob Bf towards Eilenburg
Location
- Location within Saxony Location within Germany Location within Europe

Kyhna station (German: Haltepunkt Kyhna) is a railway station in the municipality of Kyhna, located in the Nordsachsen district in Saxony, Germany.
