= LRE (disambiguation) =

LRE may refer to:

- Long Reach Ethernet, a proprietary networking protocol marketed by Cisco Systems
- Least restrictive environment in education
- Left-to-Right Embedding, the Unicode character U+202A
- Longreach Airport, the IATA code LRE
- Reußen station, the DS100 code LRE
- lre, the ISO 639 code for Laurentian language
- Language Resources and Evaluation Map, a freely accessible large database on resources dedicated to Natural language processing
- Little River Extension, one of the newest and busiest recreational trails in Windsor, Ontario
