= Schönborn =

Schönborn may refer to:

== Places ==
- Schönborn, Brandenburg, in the Elbe-Elster district, Brandenburg
- Bad Schönborn, in the district of Karlsruhe, Baden-Württemberg
- Schönborn, Rhein-Hunsrück, in the Rhein-Hunsrück district, Rhineland-Palatinate
- Schönborn, Rhein-Lahn, in the Rhein-Lahn-Kreis district, Rhineland-Palatinate
- Schönborn, Donnersbergkreis, in the Donnersbergkreis district, Rhineland-Palatinate
- Schönborn, Saxony, location of a windmill in Saxony
- Schönborn (state), a former principality of the Holy Roman Empire

== People ==
- Eleonore Schönborn (1920–2022)

The House of Schönborn counts several prelates of the Roman Catholic Church:

- Johann Philipp von Schönborn (1605–1673), Archbishop of Mainz, Bishop of Würzburg and Worms
- Lothar Franz von Schönborn (1655–1729), Archbishop of Mainz (1695–1729) and Bishop of Bamberg (1693)
- Damian Hugo Philipp von Schönborn (1676–1743), Prince Bishop of Speyer (1719–1743), Bishop of Konstanz (1740) and a cardinal
- Philipp Franz von Schönborn (1673–1724), Bishop of Würzburg (1719–1725)
- Franz Georg von Schönborn (1682–1756), Archbishop of Trier (1729–1756) and Bishop of Worms (1732)
- Friedrich Karl von Schönborn (1674–1746), Bishop of Bamberg and Bishop of Würzburg (1729–1746)
- Franziskus von Paula Graf von Schönborn (1844–1899), Cardinal Archbishop of Prague
- Christoph Schönborn (born 1945), Cardinal Archbishop of Vienna

== See also ==
- Schoenborn
