= Oppin =

- Stadtteil of Landsberg
- Coat of arms
- Interactive map of Oppin
- Location within Germany Location within Saxony-Anhalt
- Coordinates: 51°33′6″N 12°1′49″E
- Country: Germany
- State: Saxony-Anhalt
- District: Saalekreis
- Town: Landsberg

Area
  - Total: 15.74 km^{2} (6.08 sq mi)
- Elevation: 104 m (341 ft)

Population (2006-12-31)
  - Total: 1,551
  - Density: 98.54/km^{2} (255.2/sq mi)
- Time zone: UTC+01:00 (CET)
  - Summer (DST): UTC+02:00 (CEST)
- Postal codes: 06188
- Dialling codes: 034604

Oppin is a village and a former municipality in the district Saalekreis, in Saxony-Anhalt, Germany.

Since 1 January 2010, it is part of the town Landsberg.

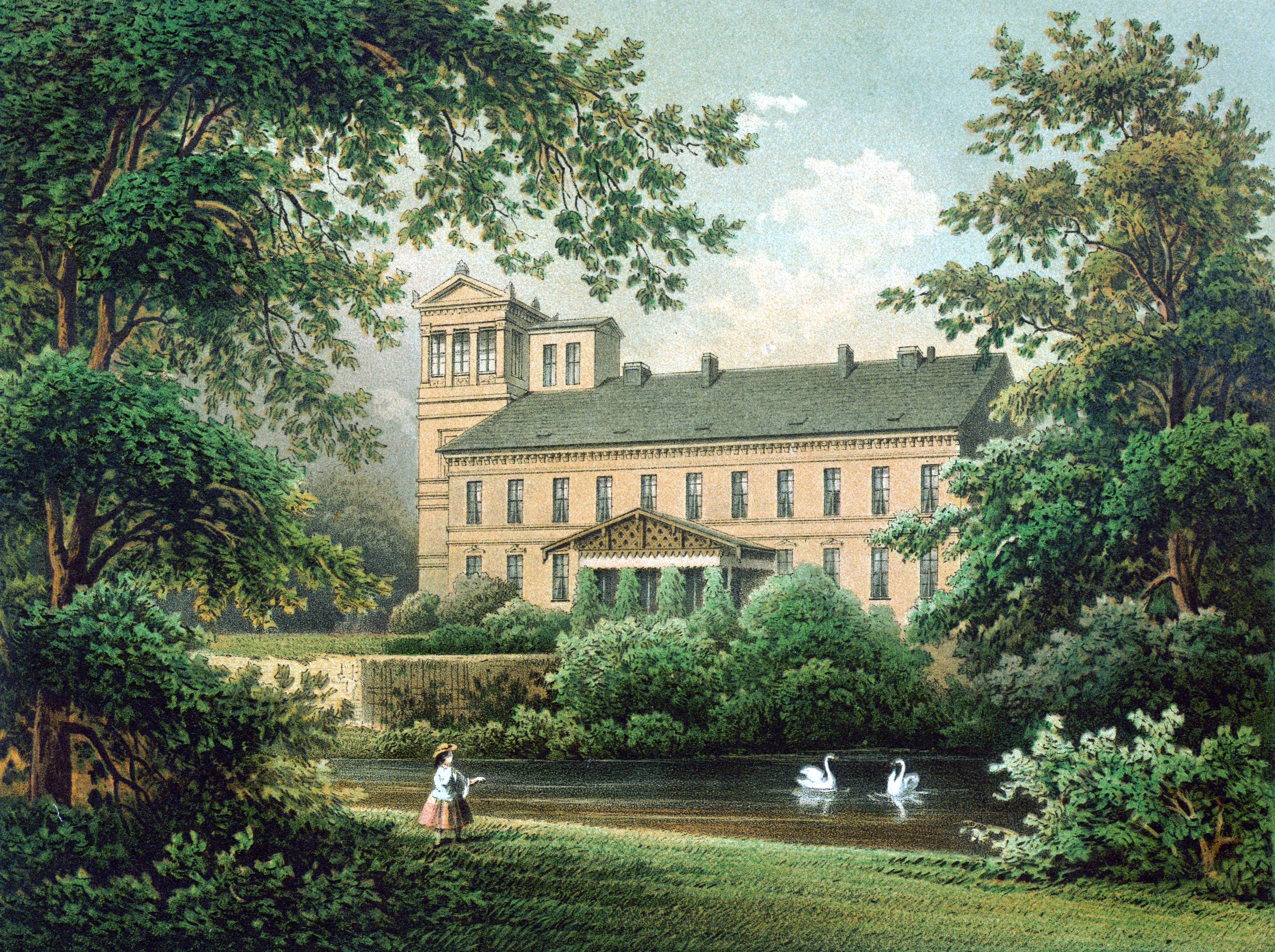
Schloss Oppin around 1860, from the collection of Alexander Duncker

== Location ==
Oppin is situate 7 km north east of Halle on the Saale. The river Riede rises not far to the north of the village and flows through the village.
