= Zwochau =

- Ortsteil of Wiedemar
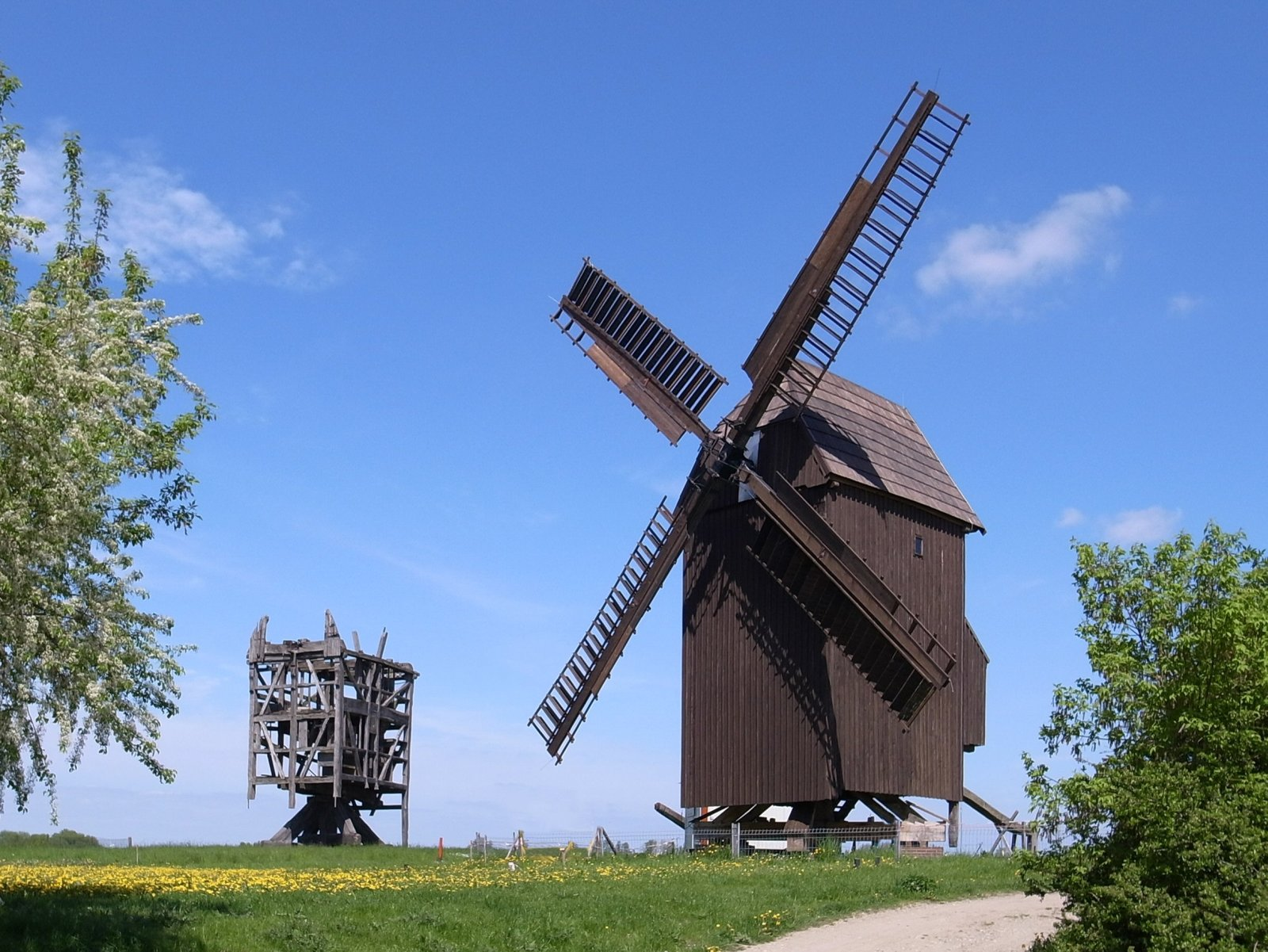
- Zwochauer Bockwindmühle

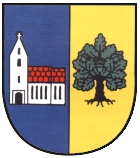
- Coat of arms
- Interactive map of Zwochau
- Location within Germany Location within Saxony
- Coordinates: 51°28′N 12°16′E
- Country: Germany
- State: Saxony
- District: Nordsachsen
- Municipality: Wiedemar

Area
  - Total: 18.84 km^{2} (7.27 sq mi)
- Elevation: 112 m (367 ft)

Population (2011-12-31)
  - Total: 1,080
  - Density: 57.3/km^{2} (148/sq mi)
- Time zone: UTC+01:00 (CET)
  - Summer (DST): UTC+02:00 (CEST)
- Postal codes: 04509
- Dialling codes: 034207
- Vehicle registration: TDO
- Website: www.zwochau.de

Zwochau is a village and a former municipality in the district (Landkreis) of North Saxony, in the administrative region (Direktionsbezirk) of Leipzig, in Saxony. Since 1 January 2013, it is part of the municipality Wiedemar.

== Location ==
The village lies approximately 30 km east of Halle (Saale), ca. 20 km northwest of Leipzig, and 10 km southwest of Delitzsch. The national autobahn no. 9 runs west of the corporate boundary and can be accessed via the Wiedemar entrance ramp (ca. 4 km). The community is marked with the vestiges of the defunct middle German Brown coal industry. Lakes are currently forming in the vast open pits of the former mines (the Werbeliner See, Grabschützer See, and Zwochauer See) as a part of the new "Saxon Sealand." The Leipzig/Halle Airport is immediately south of Zwochau in the Schkeuditz district.

== History ==
The existence of the village of Zwochau is first documented in a charter from 1158. Since 1 April 1936 the villages of Flemsdorf and Schladitz have been amalgamated with Zwochau.

From 1815 to 1944, Zwochau was part of the Prussian Province of Saxony, from 1944 to 1945 of the Province of Halle-Merseburg, from 1945 to 1952 of the State of Saxony-Anhalt, from 1952 to 1990 of the Bezirk Leipzig of East Germany and since 1990 of Saxony.

== Sights ==
- The "Saxon Sealand" (Sächsisches Seenland)
- The Zwochau Church
- The Zwochau Post Windmill (Neue Bockwindmühle)
