= Reußen station =

Railway station in the municipality of Reußen, in Saxony-Anhalt, Germany

Reußen
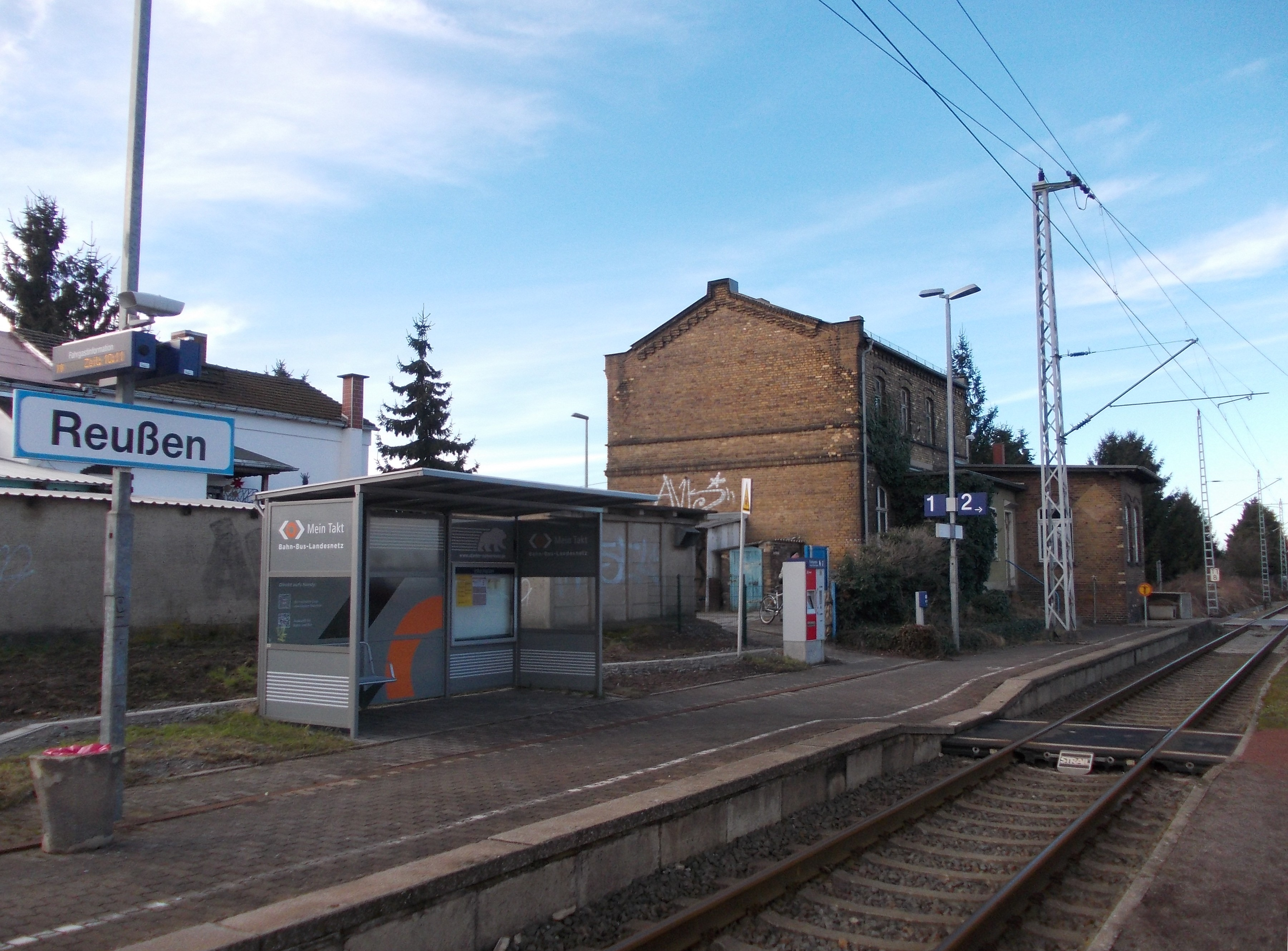
- 2014

General information
- Location: Neue Bahnhofstraße 1; 06188 Reußen; Saxony-Anhalt; Germany
- Coordinates: 51.503°N 12.134°E
- System: Bf
- Owner: Deutsche Bahn
- Operator: DB Station&Service
- Lines: Halle–Cottbus railway (KBS 219)
- Platforms: 2 side platforms
- Tracks: 3
- Train operators: S-Bahn Mitteldeutschland
- Connections: S 9

Construction
- Parking: no
- Cycle facilities: no
- Accessible: yes

Other information
- Station code: 5238
- DS100 code: LRE
- IBNR: 8012757
- Category: 6
- Fare zone: MDV: 224
- Website: www.bahnhof.de

Services
Preceding station	Mitteldeutschland S-Bahn	Following station
Peißen towards Halle (Saale) Hbf	S 9	Landsberg (b Halle/Saale) Süd towards Eilenburg
Location
- Location within Saxony-Anhalt Location within Germany Location within Europe

Reußen station (German: Bahnhof Reußen) is a railway station in the municipality of Reußen, located in the Saalekreis district in Saxony-Anhalt, Germany.
