= Winsen (Luhe) =

- Town
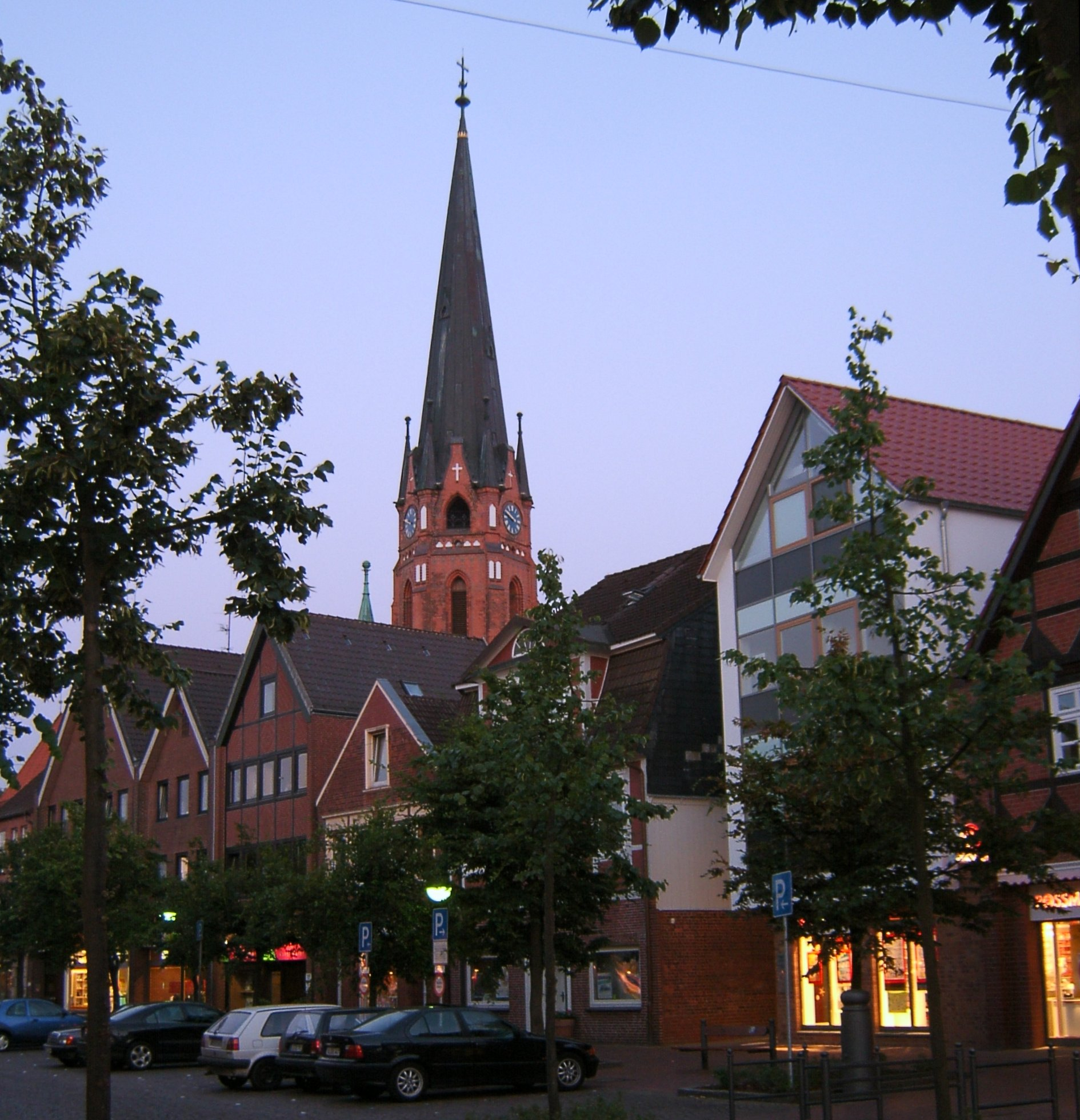
- Market street with the Church of Saint Mary

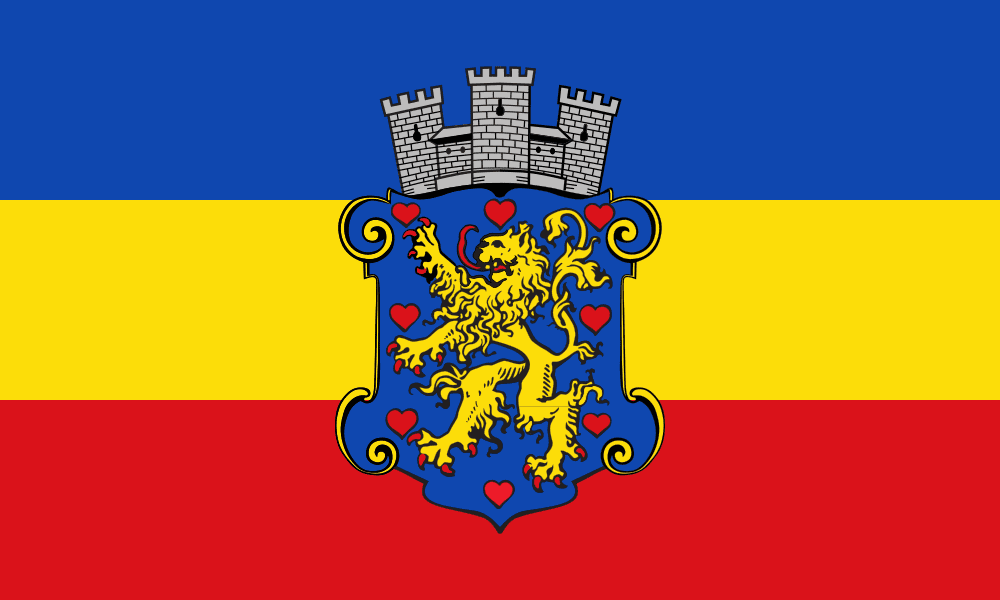
- Flag Coat of arms

- Location of Winsen within Harburg district
- Interactive map of Winsen
- Location within Germany Location within Lower Saxony
- Coordinates: 53°22′N 10°13′E
- Country: Germany
- State: Lower Saxony
- District: Harburg
- Subdivisions: 13 districts

Government
  - Mayor (2019–24): André Wiese (CDU)

Area
  - Total: 109.77 km^{2} (42.38 sq mi)
- Elevation: 5 m (16 ft)

Population (2025-12-31)
  - Total: 37,050
  - Density: 337.5/km^{2} (874.2/sq mi)
- Time zone: UTC+01:00 (CET)
  - Summer (DST): UTC+02:00 (CEST)
- Postal codes: 21423
- Dialling codes: 04171
- Vehicle registration: WL

Winsen (Luhe) (German pronunciation: [ˌvɪnzn̩ ˈluːə]) is the capital of the district of Harburg, in Lower Saxony, Germany. It is situated on the small river Luhe, near its confluence with the Elbe, approx. 25 km southeast of Hamburg, and 20 km northwest of Lüneburg.

== History ==
Winsen was first mentioned in a document of the Diocese of Verden in 1158. Winsen Castle, first mentioned in 1315, was built at a crossing over the Luhe to protect the harbour. At the beginning of the 15th century, the Church of Saint Mary was built.

In 1593, Dorothea of Denmark, widow of William the Younger, moved into Winsen Castle and lived there until her death in 1617. During this time, the Marstall (stables) was built. In the Thirty Years' War, Danes invaded the town and burned down about 25 houses.

On 1 May 1847, Winsen was connected to the Hanover–Hamburg railway of the Royal Hanoverian State Railways.

On 1 July 1972, thirteen previously independent villages, Bahlburg, Borstel, Gehrden, Hoopte, Laßrönne, Luhdorf, Pattensen, Rottorf, Roydorf, Sangenstedt, Scharmbeck, Stöckte and Tönnhausen, were incorporated into the town.

== Main sights ==
=== Winsen Castle ===
Winsen Castle was first mentioned explicitly in 1315. Another document from 1277 indicates that the castle probably already existed at that time. The castle served long periods of its history as an administrative building and was the seat of Großvögte, Amtmänner and Landräte. Today, it is the seat of the Amtsgericht; therefore, the rooms are generally not open to the public. In 2008, an exhibition was opened in the castle tower.

=== Marstall ===
The Marstall was originally used for horse and carriage. Although a timber beam shows the year 1599, the year of construction is unknown. Today, the four-story half-timbered building contains the tourist information centre, the public library, the museum of local history and an event room. On the eastern gable, a modern carillon is installed.

=== Church of Saint Mary ===
The construction of the late Gothic hall church started around 1415. The choir was covered in 1437, and the nave in 1465. The church has only one side aisle and the vault of the nave never was finished. In the 1950s, the interior decoration was changed. The colourful windows were designed and produced by Claus Wallner between 1958 and 1966. The altarpiece, the baptismal font and the bronze pulpit plates were made by Fritz Fleer. Friedrich Meinecke, born in Winsen, created the statue of Luther. Like the 62-metre-high neo-Gothic bell tower, it was completed in 1899.

=== Blaufärberhaus ===
The oldest still existing residential house is located in the Luhestraße. The Blaufärberhaus (blue-dyer's house) was built on the Luhe island immediately after the great town fire in 1585. The gable is richly decorated with Renaissance motifs. The building is not open to the public.

=== Saint George's Chapel ===
Formerly outside the town, a leprosarium, the St. Georg foundation, was established in 1401. The chapel was first documented in 1445. The present hospital building was constructed in 1766, and the chapel was built in 1750 and got its current appearance in 1903.

=== Further buildings ===
Historic buildings of the old town are situated on the Luhe island, specifically in Deichstraße, Mühlenstraße, Luhestraße, and Kehrwieder.

The Alte Stadtschule (old town school) was erected in Eckermannstraße in 1893 in historicism style. It is the oldest school in Winsen and nowadays a pure primary school. On the upper floor of the main building, there is a historic auditorium that is used for events. On the opposite side of the street, the gym of the MTV Winsen built in 1889 was located. It was destroyed to the ground in a fire in April 2016. The half-timbered building was the first gymnasium in Winsen.

The historic town hall was built in 1896. The former Amtsschreiberhaus ([scrivener]'s house) was mentioned in a document in 1714. The hotel "Zum Weißen Ross" already existed in 1684. It was the residence of Edwin von Manteuffel, commander of the Prussian Army in Austro-Prussian War, in 1866. The carefully restored Buchengasse, a connection between Rathausstraße and Plankenstraße, invites to linger. The ducal watermill was first mentioned in 1385 and moved to the southern end of the Luhe island (Mühlenstraße) in 1750. The brick facade was added in 1940.

== Twin towns – sister cities ==
Winsen is twinned with:

- Drezdenko, Poland
- Fukui Prefecture, Japan
- Le Pont-de-Claix, France
- Pritzwalk, Germany

== Notable people ==
- Johann Peter Eckermann (1792–1854), poet and friend of Johann Wolfgang von Goethe
- Wilhelm Moritz Keferstein (1833–1870), professor of zoology and comparative anatomy in Göttingen
- Rudolf Sievers (1841–1921), businessman, Senator and member of the Reichstag (NLP)
- Eduard Schlöbcke (1852–1936), building officer,
- Agnes Stavenhagen (1860–1945), born Denninghoff; operatic soprano and chamber singer
- Ernst Preczang (1870–1949), author and co-founder of books Gutenberg
- Franz Evers (1871–1947), author and editor of the monthly magazine Litterarische Blätter
- Willem Fricke (1928–2009), actor
- Erich Brüggemann (born 1928), freelance artist, known for marquetry, sculpture, painting, drawing, carpentry
- Jürgen Peter Ravens (1932–2012), journalist, newspaper publisher and author
- Hans-Peter Voigt (1936–2014), politician (CDU) and member of the German Bundestag
- Björn-Hergen Schimpf (born 1943), radio and television presenter
- Monika Wörmer-Zimmermann (born 1944), politician (SPD) and Member of Parliament
- Marlene Charell (born 1944), dancer, singer and presenter
- Hans-Henning Lühr (born 1950), diploma administration-host, politician (SPD), a lawyer and State Council in Bremen
- André Wiese (born 1975), politician (CDU), former Member of Parliament, Mayor of Winsen since 2011
- Sanny van Heteren (born 1977), actress and director
- Birte Gutzki-Heitmann (born 1977), furniture carpenter, politician (SPD), a member of the Hamburg Parliament
- Esther Möller (born 1977), athlete
- Benjamin Maack (born 1978), journalist and author
