= Prince Adalbert of Prussia (1884–1948) =

Prussian prince (1884–1948)

Prince Adalbert
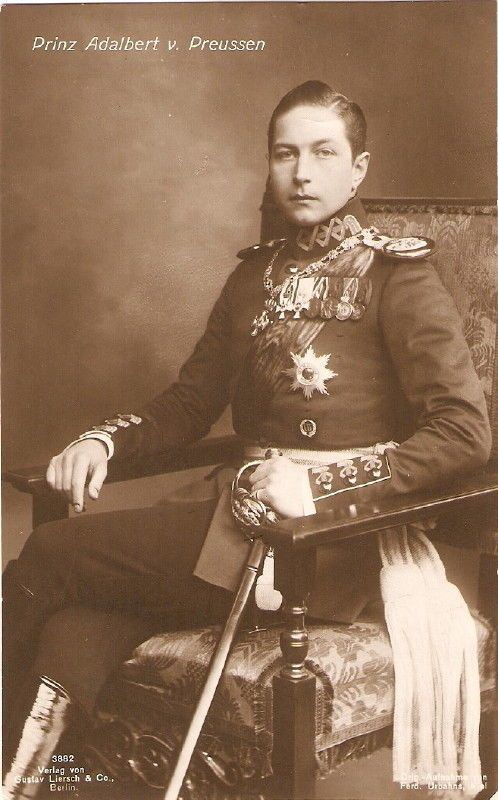
- Prince Adalbert of Prussia, 3rd son of Wilhelm II of Prussia
- Born: 14 July 1884; Marmorpalais, Potsdam, Prussia, German Empire
- Died: 22 September 1948 (aged 64); La Tour de Peilz, Vaud, Switzerland
- Burial: 26 September 1948; Vassin Cemetery, La Tour de Peilz, Vaud, Switzerland
- Spouse: Princess Adelaide of Saxe-Meiningen (m. 1914)
- Issue: Princess Victoria Marina; Prince Wilhelm Victor
Names
- Adalbert Ferdinand Berengar Viktor
- House: Hohenzollern
- Father: Wilhelm II, German Emperor
- Mother: Augusta Victoria of Schleswig-Holstein

Prince Adalbert Ferdinand Berengar Viktor of Prussia (14 July 1884 – 22 September 1948) was the third son of Wilhelm II, German Emperor, and Augusta Victoria of Schleswig-Holstein.

== Early life ==
Prince Adalbert was born on 14 July 1884 as the third son of the then Prince Wilhelm of Prussia and his first wife, Princess Augusta Victoria of Schleswig-Holstein. He was born in the Marmorpalais of Potsdam in the Province of Brandenburg, where his parents resided until his father acceded to the throne as Emperor Wilhelm II in 1888. He spent his childhood with his siblings at the New Palace, also in Potsdam, and his school days with his brothers at the Prinzenhaus in Plön in his mother’s ancestral Schleswig-Holstein.

His bride was Princess Adelheid "Adi" of Saxe-Meiningen (16 August 1891 – 25 April 1971), daughter of Prince Frederick and Countess Adelaide of Lippe-Biesterfeld. They married on 3 August 1914 in Wilhelmshaven, Germany, and had three children, five grandchildren, six great-grandchildren and two great-great-grandchildren:

- Princess Victoria Marina of Prussia (born and died, 4 September 1915) stillborn
- Princess Victoria Marina of Prussia (11 September 1917 – 21 January 1981) she married Kirby Patterson (24 July 1907 – 4 June 1984) on 26 September 1947. They had three children and one grandson:
  - Berengar Orin Bernhard Kirby Patterson (21 August 1948 – 18 May 2011) he married Pamela Knight in 1994.
  - Marina Adelaide Emily Patterson (21 August 1948 – 10 January 2011) she married John Engel on 24 September 1982. They had one son:
    - William John Engel (17 February 1983)
  - Dohna Maria Patterson (7 August 1954) she married Stephen Pearl on 28 July 1974.
- Prince Wilhelm Victor of Prussia (15 February 1919 – 7 February 1989), he married at Donaueschingen on 20 July 1944 Marie Antoinette, Countess of Hoyos zu Stichsenstein (Hohenthurm, 27 June 1920 – Marbella, 1 March 2004). They had two children, five grandchildren and two great-grandchildren:
  - Princess Marie Louise Marina Franziska of Prussia (18 September 1945) she married Count Rudolf (Rudi) of Schönburg-Glauchau on 19 May 1971. They have two children:
    - Countess Sophie Anastasia Wilhelmine Marie Antoinette of Schönburg-Glauchau (17 May 1979) she married Carles Andreu Alacreu on 21 September 2013. They have two children:
      - Rudi Federico Nicolas Alacreu y Schönburg-Glauchau (12 September 2017)
      - Carlota Alacreu y Schönburg-Glauchau (6 May 2019)
    - Count Friedrich Wilhelm Simeon Dionysius Joachim Rudolf Maria Adelbert of Schönburg-Glauchau (27 April 1985)
  - Prince Adalbert Alexander Friedrich Joachim Christian (born Konstanz 4 March 1948), who married at Glentorf 14 June 1981 Eva Maria Kudicke (born Shahi, Iran 30 June 1951); They have three sons:
    - Prince Alexander Friedrich Wilhelm-Viktor Marcus of Prussia (3 October 1984), he married Jenny von Rumohr (15 December 1985) on 14 February 2020.
    - Prince Christian Friedrich Wilhelm Johannes of Prussia (3 July 1986)
    - Prince Philipp Heinrich Adalbert Günther of Prussia (3 July 1986), he married Aline von Alvensleben on 27 September 2024, descendant of Count Albrecht von Alvensleben-Schönborn (1826–1874)
      - Princess Coralie of Prussia (2025)

== Kaiserliche Marine ==
- Leutnant zur See (Ensign / Acting Sub-Lieutenant)
- Oberleutnant zur See (Lieutenant, Junior Grade / Sub-Lieutenant), before 1905 through at least 1908
- Kapitänleutnant (Lieutenant) on staff in SMS Kaiser, 1914
- Korvettenkapitän (Lieutenant Commander) in command of SMS Danzig, 1917
- Fregattenkapitän (Commander) in command of SMS Dresden 1918.

== Regimental Commissions ==
- Leutnant (2nd Lieutenant) à la suite 1. Garderegiment zu Fuß (1st Regiment of Foot Guards), Potsdam, 1894
- à la suite, Grenadierregiment König Friedrich der Große (3. Ostpreussisches) Nr. 4
- à la suite, 1. Gardegrenadierlandwehrregiment (1st Reserve Regiment of Grenadier Guards)

== Chivalric Orders ==
- Knight, Order of the Black Eagle with Chain (Prussia), invested 18 January 1903
- Knight Grand Cross (with Crown), Order of the Red Eagle (Prussia)
- Knight, First Class, Order of the Prussian Crown
- Grand Commander, Royal House Order of Hohenzollern
- Honour Cross, First Class, Princely House Order of Hohenzollern
- Knight, First Class (with Crown in ore), House Order of the Wendish Crown (Grand Duchies of Mechlenburg)
- Knight Grand Cross, Order of the White Falcon (Grand Duchy of Saxe-Weimar-Eisenach)
- House Order of Fidelity (Baden)
- Hanseatic Cross (Bremen)
- Grand Cross of the Ludwig Order (Hesse)
- Grand Cross with golden crown of the House and Merit Order of Peter Frederick Louis (Oldenburg)
- Friedrich August Cross, 1st class
- Order of the Rue Crown (Saxony)
- Grand Cross of the Ducal Saxe-Ernestine House Order (Saxon Duchies)
- Grand Cross of the Order of the Crown with Swords (Württemberg)
- Knight, Supreme Order of the Most Holy Annunciation, Kingdom of Italy
- Knight, First Class, Order of the Netherlands Lion (Netherlands)
- Knight Grand Cross, Royal Hungarian Order of Saint Stephen, Empire of Austria-Hungary
- Knight Grand Cross, Order of Tower and Sword, Portugal
- Knight Grand Cross, Order of the Romanian Crown, Kingdom of Romania
- Knight, Order of Saint Andrew, the First Called, Imperial Russia
- Knight, (star with diamonds) Nichan Iftikhar (Order of Glory, Ottoman Empire) - 21 October 1901 - during the visit to Istanbul of SMS Charlotte, where he served
- Knight, First Class (Star with diamonds), Order of Osmanieh (Ottoman Empire)
- Knight First Class, Order of the Brilliant Star of Zanzibar, Sultanate of Zanzibar (Tanzania)
- Grand Cordon, Supreme Order of the Chrysanthemum, Imperial Japan

== Military Decorations ==
- Gold and silver Imtiyaz Medals (Privilege, Ottoman Empire)
- Gold Liakat Medal (Merit, Ottoman Empire) - 21 October 1901 - during the visit to Istanbul of SMS Charlotte, where he served
- Iron Cross of 1914, 1st and 2nd class, Imperial Germany / Kingdom of Prussia

== Death ==
Adalbert died in La Tour de Peilz, Switzerland, aged 64.

== Ancestry ==
Ancestors of Prince Adalbert of Prussia (1884–1948)

8. William I, German Emperor
4. Frederick III, German Emperor
9. Princess Augusta of Saxe-Weimar-Eisenach
2. Wilhelm II, German Emperor
10. Prince Albert of Saxe-Coburg and Gotha
5. Victoria, Princess Royal
11. Victoria, Queen of the United Kingdom
1. Prince Adalbert of Prussia
12. Christian August II, Duke of Schleswig-Holstein-Sonderburg-Augustenburg
6. Frederick VIII, Duke of Schleswig-Holstein
13. Countess Louise Sophie af Danneskiold-Samsøe
3. Princess Augusta Victoria of Schleswig-Holstein-Sonderburg-Augustenburg
14. Ernst I, Prince of Hohenlohe-Langenburg
7. Princess Adelheid of Hohenlohe-Langenburg
15. Princess Feodora of Leiningen
