= Hoyos family =

Spanish and Austrian noble family

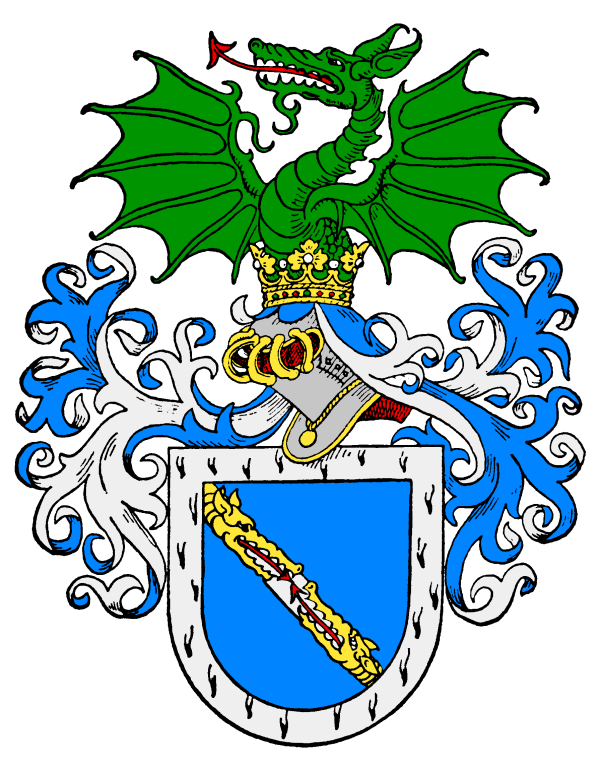
Coat of arms of the Hoyos family

The House of Hoyos is a prominent Austrian noble family of an ancient Castilian origin, whose members held significant political positions during the Austro-Hungarian and the German Empire.

== History ==
It derives its name from El Hoyo de Pinares in Ávila, Castile and León, and can be traced back to the 9th century. Juan de Hoyos and his family accompanied the later Ferdinand I, Holy Roman Emperor, to Lower Austria in 1525, founding the Austrian branch of the family. This branch rose to prominence in Austria and in Hungary as Hungarian magnates over the centuries.

Johann Baptist von Hoyos (1506-1579) was awarded with the title of Imperial Baron in 1549. His two sons, elder Ferdinand Albrecht Freiherr Hoyos von Stichsenstein (1533-1609) and younger Ludwig Hoyos Freiherr Hoyos von Stichsenstein (1550-1600) formed two branches of the family. Members of the elder line of the family were elevated to the rank of Imperial counts in 1682 and survived until today. Members of the younger line were also elevated to the dignity of Imperial counts in 1628, but became extinct in 1718.

The Hoyos family crypt is in the Minoritenkirche, Vienna.

== Notable members ==
- Ernst Karl von Hoyos-Sprinzenstein (1830–1903), Austrian landowner and politician
- Alexander, Count of Hoyos (1876-1937), Austro-Hungarian diplomat
- Marguerite, Countess of Hoyos (1871–1945), sister of Alexander; married Herbert, Prince of Bismarck (1849-1904) and became Princess of Bismarck
- Melanie, Countess of Hoyos (1916–1949), daughter of Alexander; married her cousin Gottfried, Count von Bismarck-Schönhausen (1901-1949) and became Countess von Bismarck-Schönhausen
- Marie Antoinette, Countess of Hoyos (1920–2004), married Prince Wilhem Victor of Prussia (1919–1989), son of Prince Adalbert of Prussia
- Ladislas de Hoyos Count of Hoyos (1939-2011), French TV journalist
- Douglas Hoyos-Trauttmansdorff (1990), Austrian politician

== Literature ==
- Genealogisches Handbuch des Adels, Adelslexikon Band VI, Band 91 der Gesamtreihe, S. 389–390, C. A. Starke Verlag, Limburg (Lahn) 1987, ISSN|0435-2408.
- Michael S. Habsburg-Lothringen: Die Familie Hoyos. Geschichte und Persönlichkeiten. In: Herbert Knittler (ed.): Adel im Wandel. Politik, Kultur, Konfession 1500–1700, Katalog der Niederösterreichischen Landesausstellung Rosenburg 1990. Wien 1990, ISBN 3-85460-019-4, S. 565–576.
