= Braschwitz =

- Stadtteil of Landsberg
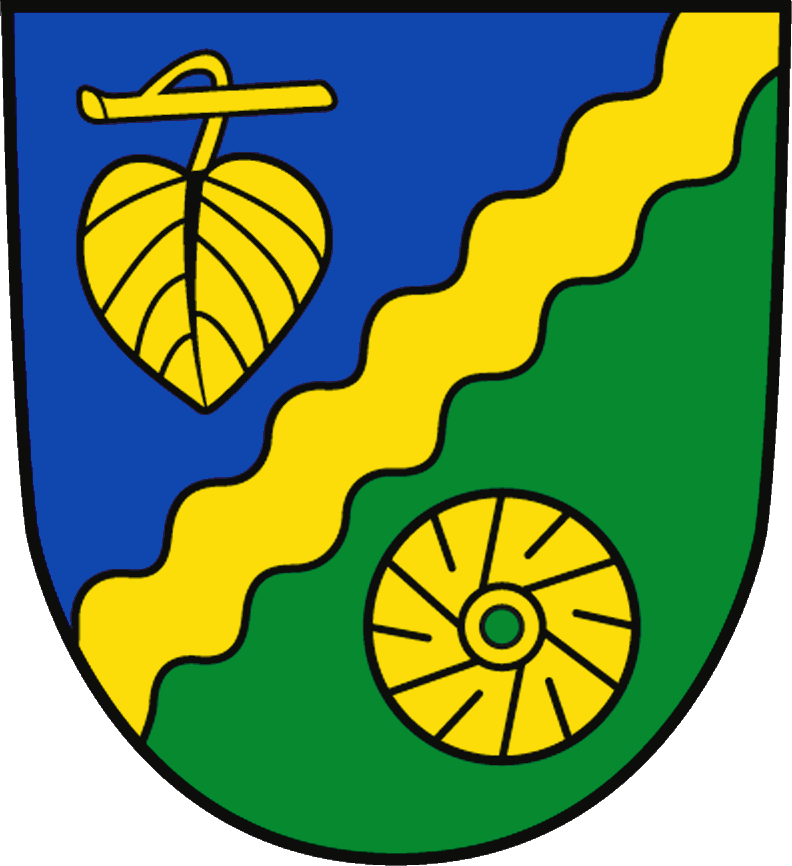
- Coat of arms
- Interactive map of Braschwitz
- Location within Germany Location within Saxony-Anhalt
- Coordinates: 51°31′N 12°4′E
- Country: Germany
- State: Saxony-Anhalt
- District: Saalekreis
- Town: Landsberg

Area
  - Total: 6.90 km^{2} (2.66 sq mi)
- Elevation: 99 m (325 ft)

Population (2006-12-31)
  - Total: 1,264
  - Density: 183/km^{2} (474/sq mi)
- Time zone: UTC+01:00 (CET)
  - Summer (DST): UTC+02:00 (CEST)
- Postal codes: 06188
- Dialling codes: 034604
- Vehicle registration: SK
- Website: www.braschwitz.de

Braschwitz is a village and a former municipality in the district Saalekreis, in Saxony-Anhalt, Germany.

Since 20 April 2010, it is part of the town Landsberg.
