= Friedrich Meinecke (sculptor) =

German sculptor

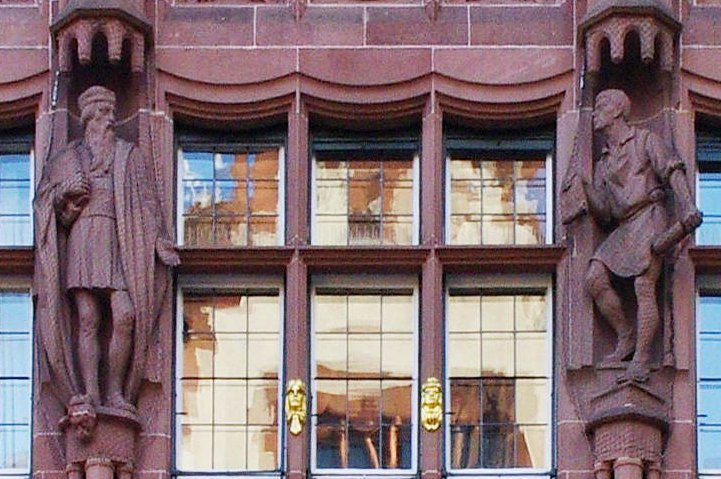
Gutenberg Group

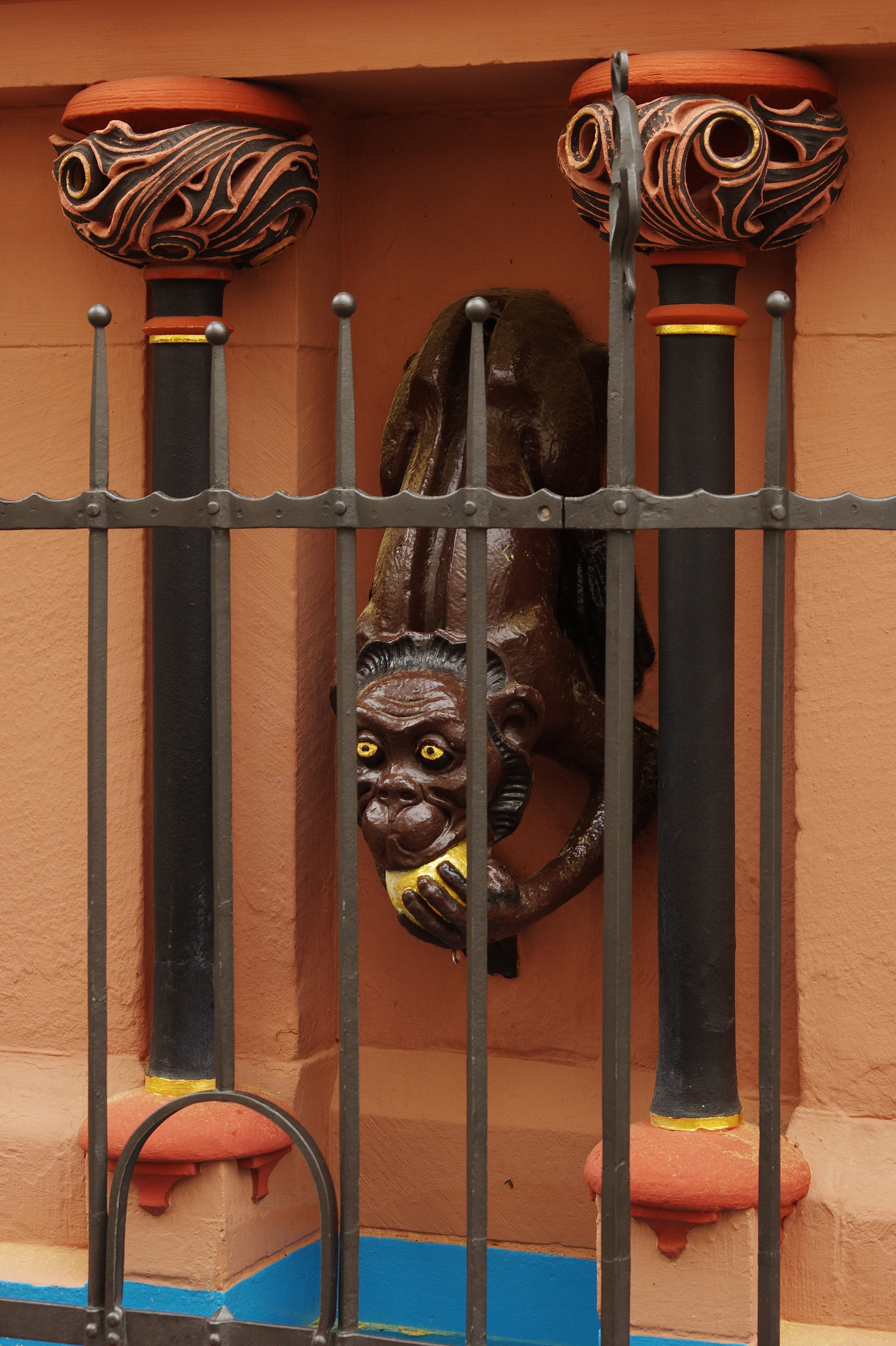
Monkey Fountain

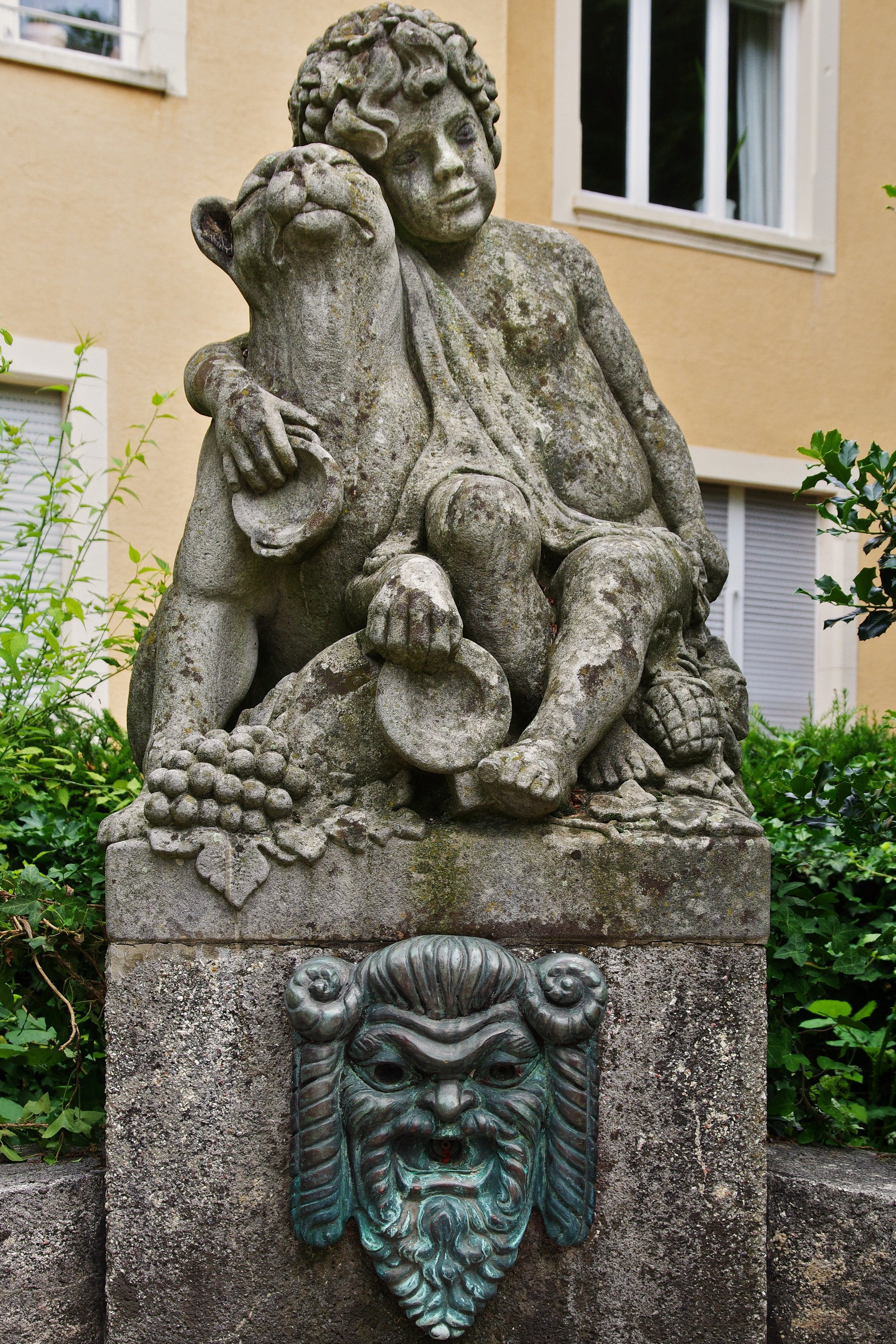
Bacchus Fountain

Friedrich Meinecke (20 May 1873 – 25 July 1913) was a German sculptor. Born in Winsen, Lower Saxony, he worked as in Freiburg im Breisgau, Baden-Württemberg.

== Gutenberg Group ==
The Gutenberg Group from around 1905 in the facade of the building of the former newspaper Freiburger Zeitung is one of the earliest works of Friedrich Meinecke which is still preserved today.

== Monkey Fountain ==
The Monkey Fountain is a fountain on the outside wall of a bank in the historic center of Freiburg which was built in 1905 to replace an older cast iron fountain in the same place. The bank built the fountain with the financial support of the city as a public water supply fountain. Friedrich Meinecke's sculpture depicts a monkey biting an apple. Water flows from the mouth of the monkey into a semicircular bowl and from there into one of Freiburg's streamlets. Symbolically, the monkey represents a man who must bite the sour apple (as they say in German for being forced to do something unpleasant, i.e. having to bite the bullet) and pay the debts of another after carelessly having given bail.

== Bacchus Fountain ==
The Bacchus Fountain in Freiburg's suburb Herdern dates back to 1909. The sculpture of the boy on this fountain, created with sandstone and artificial stone, has also been interpreted as Silenus.
