= Neukyhna =

Village in the state of Saxony, Germany

- Ortsteil of Wiedemar
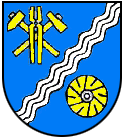
- Coat of arms
- Interactive map of Neukyhna
- Location within Germany Location within Saxony
- Coordinates: 51°31′N 12°15′E
- Country: Germany
- State: Saxony
- District: Nordsachsen
- Municipality: Wiedemar

Area
  - Total: 40.25 km^{2} (15.54 sq mi)
- Elevation: 99 m (325 ft)

Population (2011-12-31)
  - Total: 2,379
  - Density: 59.11/km^{2} (153.1/sq mi)
- Time zone: UTC+01:00 (CET)
  - Summer (DST): UTC+02:00 (CEST)
- Postal codes: 04509
- Dialling codes: 034202, 034602, 034954
- Vehicle registration: TDO
- Website: www.neukyhna.de (archive)

Neukyhna is a village and a former municipality in the district of Nordsachsen, in Saxony, Germany. It has an area of 40.25 km^{2} and a population of 2379 (as of December 31, 2011). Since 1 January 2013, it is part of the municipality of Wiedemar.
