= Niemberg =

- Stadtteil of Landsberg
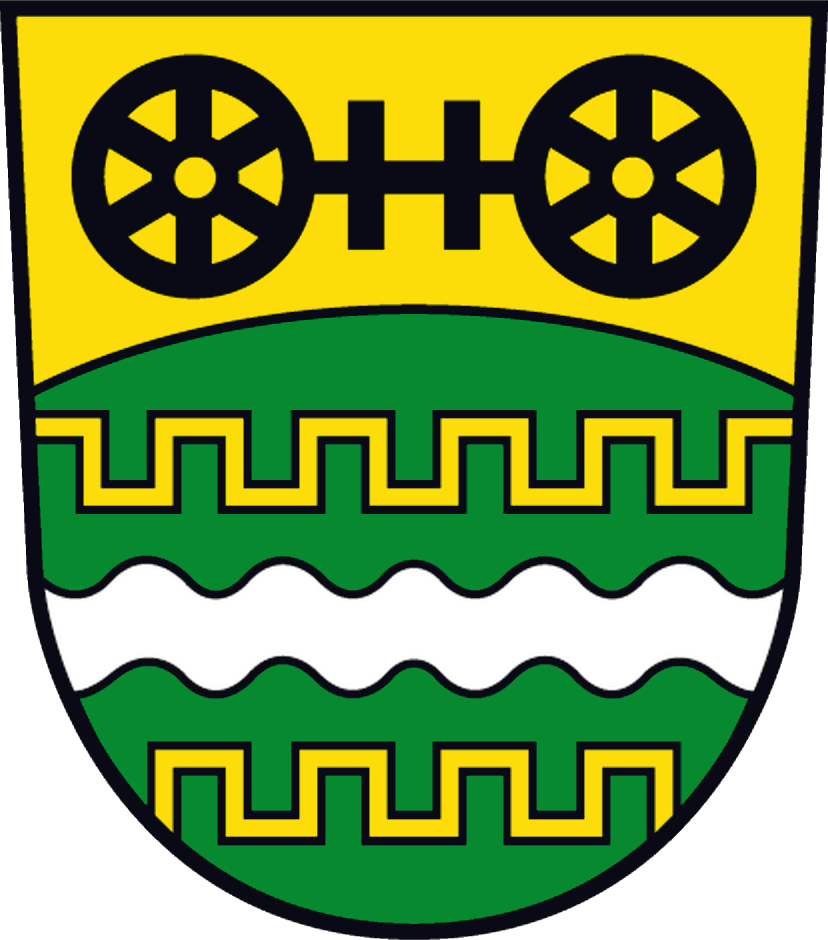
- Coat of arms
- Interactive map of Niemberg
- Location within Germany Location within Saxony-Anhalt
- Coordinates: 51°33′6″N 12°5′27″E
- Country: Germany
- State: Saxony-Anhalt
- District: Saalekreis
- Town: Landsberg

Area
  - Total: 9.89 km^{2} (3.82 sq mi)
- Elevation: 94 m (308 ft)

Population (2006-12-31)
  - Total: 1,482
  - Density: 150/km^{2} (388/sq mi)
- Time zone: UTC+01:00 (CET)
  - Summer (DST): UTC+02:00 (CEST)
- Postal codes: 06188
- Dialling codes: 034604
- Vehicle registration: SK

Niemberg is a village and a former municipality in the district Saalekreis, in Saxony-Anhalt, Germany.

Since 1 January 2010, it is part of the town Landsberg.
