= El Hoyo de Pinares =

- municipality
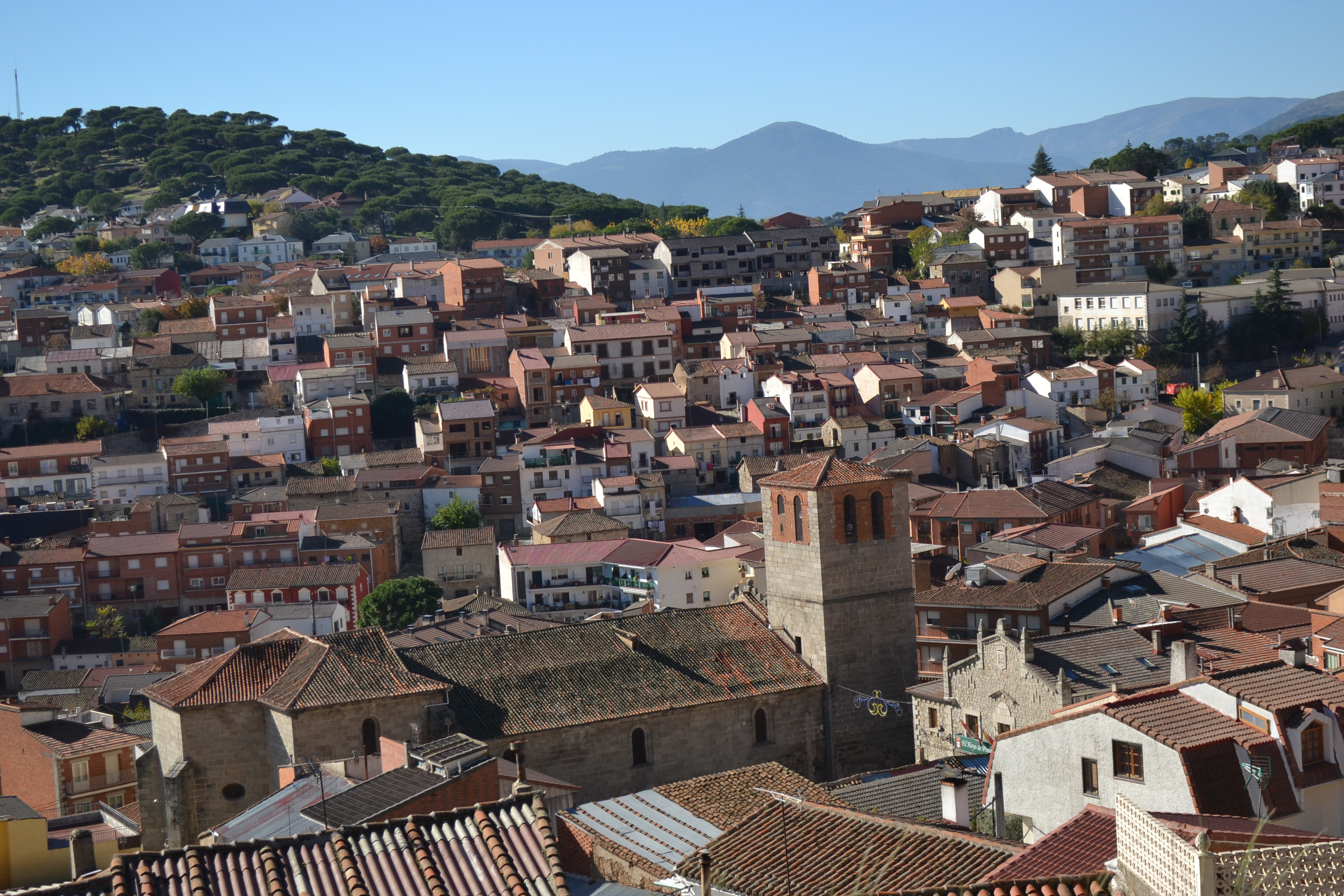
- View of El Hoyo de Pinares

- Flag Coat of arms

- Location in Spain. El Hoyo de Pinares (Spain)
- Coordinates: 40°30′03″N 4°25′26″W
- Country: Spain
- Autonomous community: Castile and León
- Province: Ávila

Area
  - Total: 80.51 km^{2} (31.09 sq mi)
- Elevation: 850 m (2,790 ft)

Population (2025-01-01)
  - Total: 2,179
  - Density: 27.06/km^{2} (70.10/sq mi)
- Time zone: UTC+1 (CET)
  - Summer (DST): UTC+2 (CEST)
- Website: Official website

El Hoyo de Pinares is a municipality located in the province of Ávila, Castile and León, Spain.

The House of Hoyos, a prominent noble family of Austria-Hungary, in named after this place.

== Population ==
Historical population
Year	Pop.	±% p.a.
2023	2,153	—
2024	2,183	+1.39%
2025	2,179	−0.18%
Source: INE
