= Landsberg, Saxony-Anhalt =

Landsberg
- Town
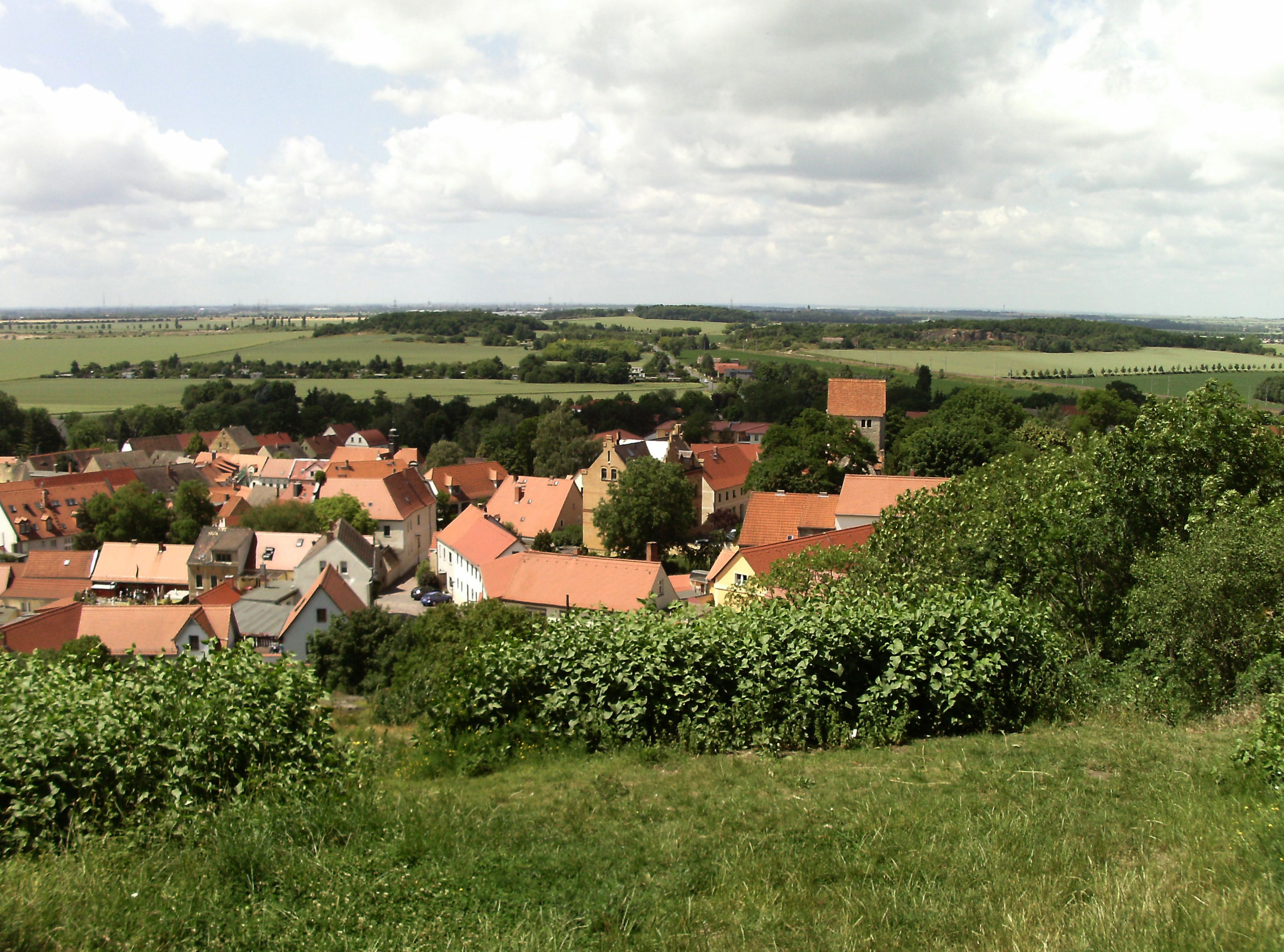
- Old town, view from Chapel Hill

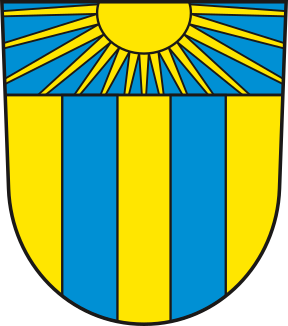
- Coat of arms

- Location of Landsberg within Saalekreis district
- Interactive map of Landsberg
- Location within Germany Location within Saxony-Anhalt
- Coordinates: 51°32′N 12°10′E
- Country: Germany
- State: Saxony-Anhalt
- District: Saalekreis
- Subdivisions: 11

Government
  - Mayor (2022–29): Tobias Halfpap

Area
  - Total: 125.38 km^{2} (48.41 sq mi)
- Elevation: 97 m (318 ft)

Population (2025-12-31)
  - Total: 14,684
  - Density: 117.12/km^{2} (303.33/sq mi)
- Time zone: UTC+01:00 (CET)
  - Summer (DST): UTC+02:00 (CEST)
- Postal codes: 06186–06188
- Dialling codes: 034602
- Vehicle registration: SK
- Website: www.stadt-landsberg.de

Landsberg (German pronunciation: [ˈlantsbɛʁk]) is a town in the Saalekreis in the state of Saxony-Anhalt, Germany

== Geography ==
The town is located between the cities of Halle, about 19 km (12 mi) in the southwest, Leipzig, about 25 km (16 mi) in the southeast, and Bitterfeld-Wolfen, about 15 km (9.3 mi) in the north. Located in the Leipzig Bay of the North German Plain, Landsberg lies within the larger Leipzig-Halle agglomeration in the Central German Metropolitan Region.

The municipal area immediately borders the independent city of Halle in the southwest and the Nordsachsen district of Saxony in the southeast. After several incorporations in recent years, it currently comprises 11 localities (Ortschaften):

- Braschwitz
- Hohenthurm
- Landsberg
- Niemberg
- Oppin
- Peißen
- Queis
- Reußen
- Schwerz
- Sietzsch
- Spickendorf

Known far beyond Landsberg is the Felsenbad ("Cliff Bath"), a swimming pool complex with diving platforms, a 50-metre (160 ft) stretch of competition swimming lanes, and a vast shallow pool where non-swimmers may bathe. Furthermore, the town is the namesake of the well known – in Germany – Landsberger Gemenge (roughly "Landsberg Batch"), a winter catch crop made out of crimson clover, Italian ryegrass and fodder vetch, which is used as livestock fodder or silage.

Landsberg station is a stop on the Berlin–Halle railway, Halle–Cottbus railway, and Magdeburg-Leipzig railway lines.

== History ==
The oldest known trace of early settlements in what is now Landsberg dates from the Neolithic. It is first documented as civitas holm in a 961 deed issued by King Otto I of Germany, then located in the Slavic lands beyond the southeastern borders of the Duchy of Saxony along the Saale River.

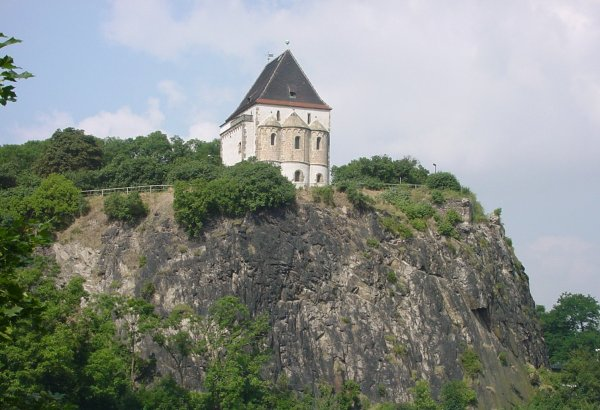
Landsberg Double Chapel

Landsberg Castle from the 12th century onwards was the seat of the Margraves of Landsberg. Held by the Saxon noble House of Wettin, it was rebuilt when Margrave Conrad of Meissen ceded the March of Lusatia with Landsberg to his son Theodoric I in 1156. A loyal follower of the Hohenstaufen emperor Frederick Barbarossa, Theoderic accompanied him on his Italian campaign of 1176/77 against the cities of the Lombard League and witnessed the peace negotiations leading to the Treaty of Venice. Back in Germany, he had a Staufian double chapel erected on the Landsberg castle hill. Built in a Romanesque style up on a cliff and visible even far from the town, it is one of Landsberg's landmarks up to today.

When the Wettin margrave Henry III of Meissen about 1258 re-established the Margraviate of Landsberg for his second son Theodoric, Landsberg Castle had already lost its status as the margravial residence to Weißenfels. Upon the death of Theoderic's son Frederick Tuta in 1291, Landsberg fell to the Ascanian margrave Otto IV of Brandenburg. During decades of feuds between the Wettin and Ascanian dynasties the castle decayed and today only traces of wall remain.

The settlement at the foot of the castle arose around the St Nicholas parish church dating from the 13th century. In 1579, the citizens of Landsberg were granted town privileges by the Saxon electors, though on condition not to erect city fortifications. Severely damaged during the Thirty Years' War, the Landsberg double chapel about 1658/62 was restored at the behest of the Wettin duke Christian I of Saxe-Merseburg.

In 2019, two people were killed and two others were injured in a terrorist attack in the city of Halle. Two of the injuries occurred in the city of Landsberg.

== Coat of arms ==
The town's coat of arms, called "Landsberg Pales" (Landsberger Pfähle) according to heraldic blazon, is first known to have appeared in the late 12th century, and the margraves of the Wettin dynasty, local rulers since the 10th century, used it as their arms. The blue Landsberg Pales appear on the coat of arms of numerous towns and cities in Central Germany, such as Chemnitz, Dresden (in black), and Leipzig.
