= Hohenthurm =

- Stadtteil of Landsberg
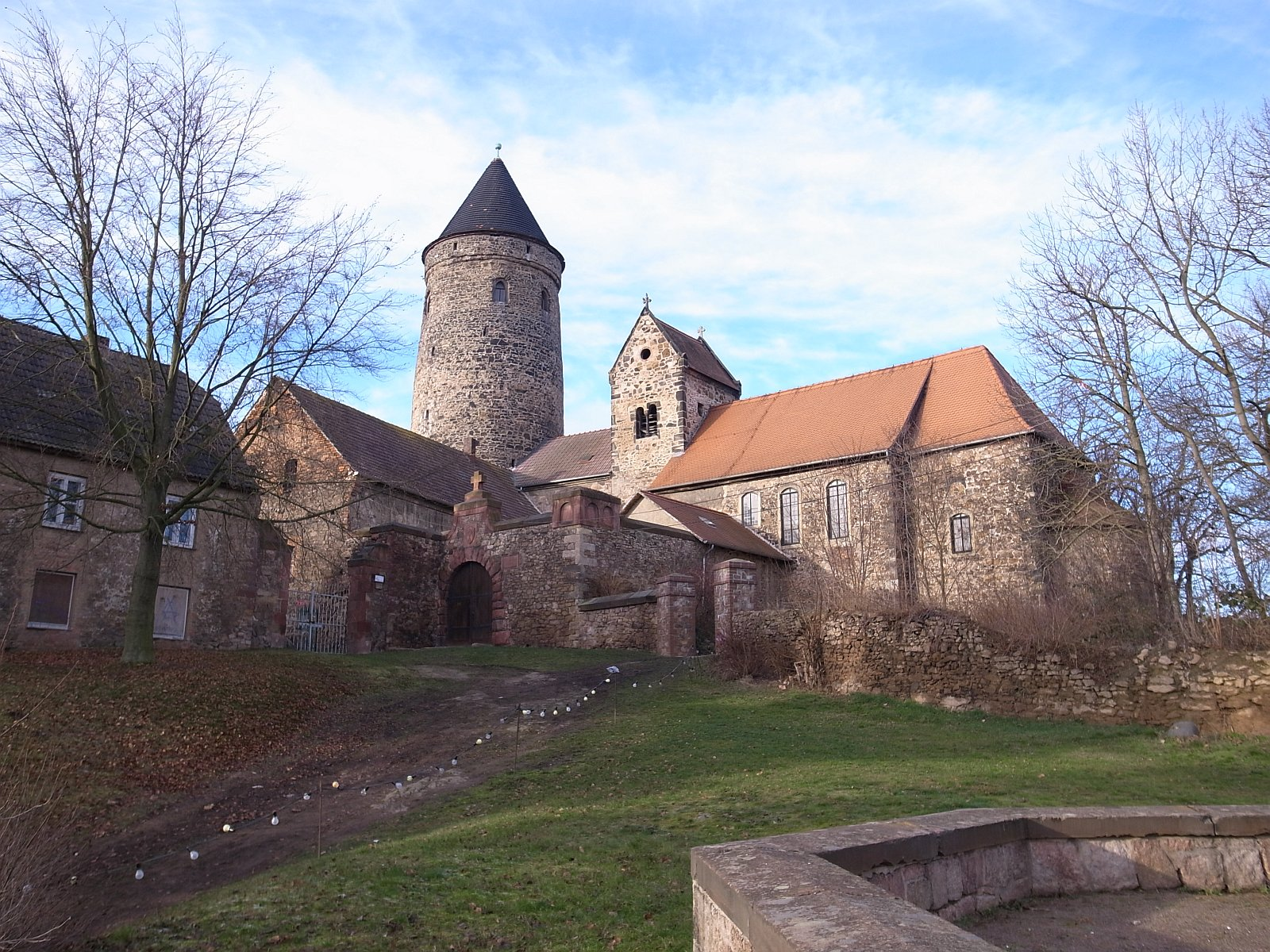

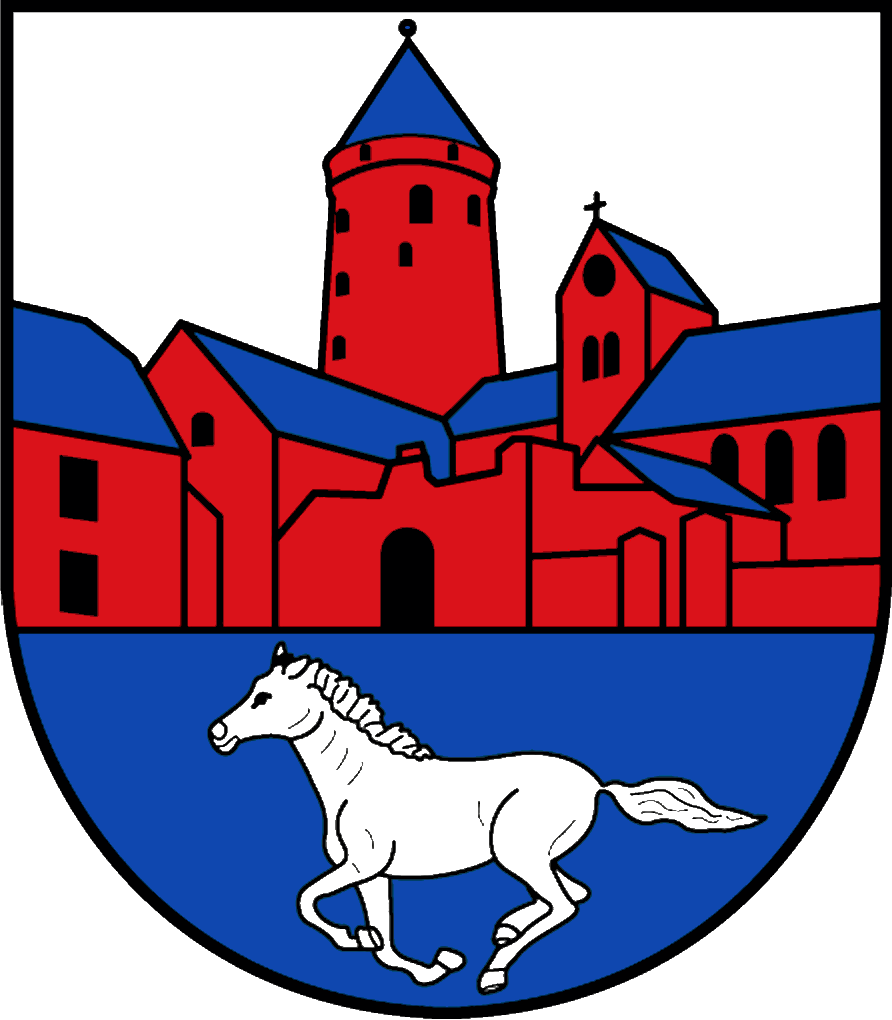
- Coat of arms
- Interactive map of Hohenthurm
- Location within Germany Location within Saxony-Anhalt
- Coordinates: 51°31′N 12°6′E
- Country: Germany
- State: Saxony-Anhalt
- District: Saalekreis
- Town: Landsberg

Area
  - Total: 7.76 km^{2} (3.00 sq mi)
- Elevation: 107 m (351 ft)

Population (2009-12-31)
  - Total: 1,629
  - Density: 210/km^{2} (544/sq mi)
- Time zone: UTC+01:00 (CET)
  - Summer (DST): UTC+02:00 (CEST)
- Postal codes: 06188
- Dialling codes: 034602
- Vehicle registration: SK

Hohenthurm is a village and a former municipality in the Saalekreis district, Saxony-Anhalt, Germany.

Since 1 September 2010, it is part of the town Landsberg.
