= Peißen, Saalekreis =

Peißen
- Stadtteil of Landsberg
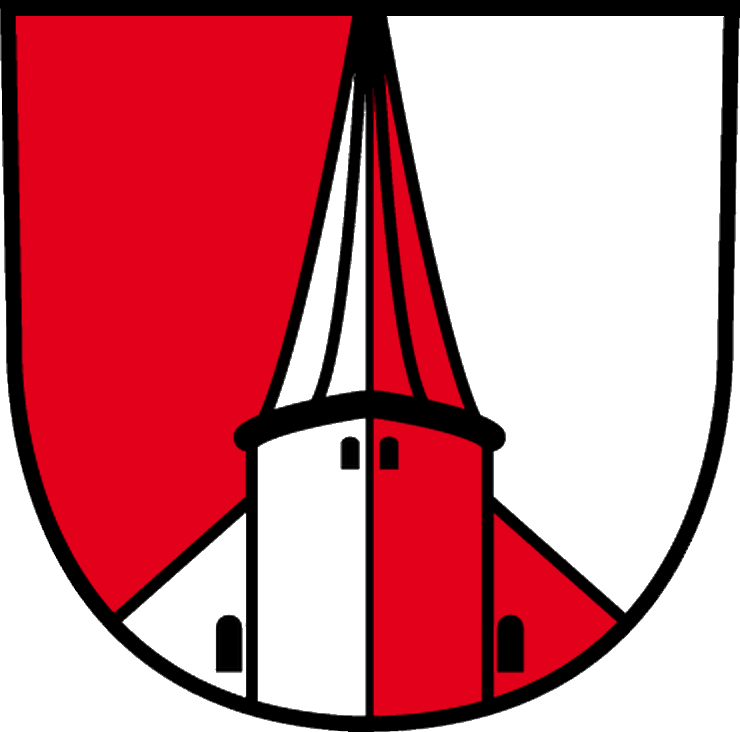
- Coat of arms
- Interactive map of Peißen
- Location within Germany Location within Saxony-Anhalt
- Coordinates: 51°30′10″N 12°3′28″E
- Country: Germany
- State: Saxony-Anhalt
- District: Saalekreis
- Town: Landsberg
- Subdivisions: 4

Area
  - Total: 10.34 km^{2} (3.99 sq mi)
- Elevation: 97 m (318 ft)

Population (2009-12-31)
  - Total: 1,019
  - Density: 98.55/km^{2} (255.2/sq mi)
- Time zone: UTC+01:00 (CET)
  - Summer (DST): UTC+02:00 (CEST)
- Postal codes: 06188
- Dialling codes: 0345
- Vehicle registration: SK
- Website: www.peissen.de

Peißen (German pronunciation: [ˈpaɪsn̩]) is a village and a former municipality in the Saalekreis district, Saxony-Anhalt, Germany. Since 1 September 2010, it is part of the town Landsberg.
