= Wiedemar =

- Municipality
- Coat of arms

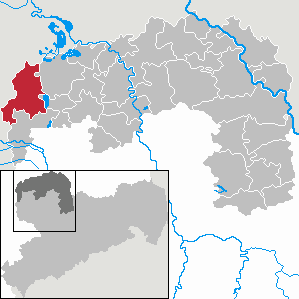
- Location of Wiedemar within Nordsachsen district
- Interactive map of Wiedemar
- Location within Germany Location within Saxony
- Coordinates: 51°29′N 12°14′E
- Country: Germany
- State: Saxony
- District: Nordsachsen
- Subdivisions: 7

Government
  - Mayor (2020–27): Steve Ganzer (CDU)

Area
  - Total: 93.48 km^{2} (36.09 sq mi)
- Elevation: 115 m (377 ft)

Population (2025-12-31)
  - Total: 5,569
  - Density: 59.57/km^{2} (154.3/sq mi)
- Time zone: UTC+01:00 (CET)
  - Summer (DST): UTC+02:00 (CEST)
- Postal codes: 04509
- Dialling codes: 034207
- Vehicle registration: TDO
- Website: www.wiedemar.de

Wiedemar (German pronunciation: [ˈviːdəmaʁ]) is a municipality in the district of Nordsachsen, in Saxony, Germany.
