= List of people with post-traumatic stress disorder =

Many notable people have had post-traumatic stress disorder, or PTSD. This is a list of people with verifiable sources confirming that they struggled with PTSD. In the case of historical figures, retrospective diagnoses are only included when mainstream, expert sources indicate that they probably had the disorder.

PTSD is a mental disorder which develops in the aftermath of a traumatic event, such as witnessing or experiencing warfare, sexual assault, child abuse, domestic abuse, genocide, natural disasters, traffic collisions, and so on. Not everyone who experiences trauma will develop PTSD. Symptoms include flashbacks, nightmares, increased fight-or-flight response, mental and physical distress when reminded of the trauma, efforts to avoid traumatic memories or reminders of the trauma, forgetting parts of the traumatic event(s), negative beliefs about oneself and/or the world, reckless behavior, problems sleeping, irritability, negative emotional state, a feeling of being detached from others, blaming oneself for the trauma, and an inability to experience happiness or pleasure. Women are more likely to have PTSD than men.

== A ==
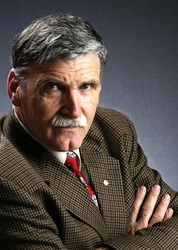
Roméo Dallaire, humanitarian and author

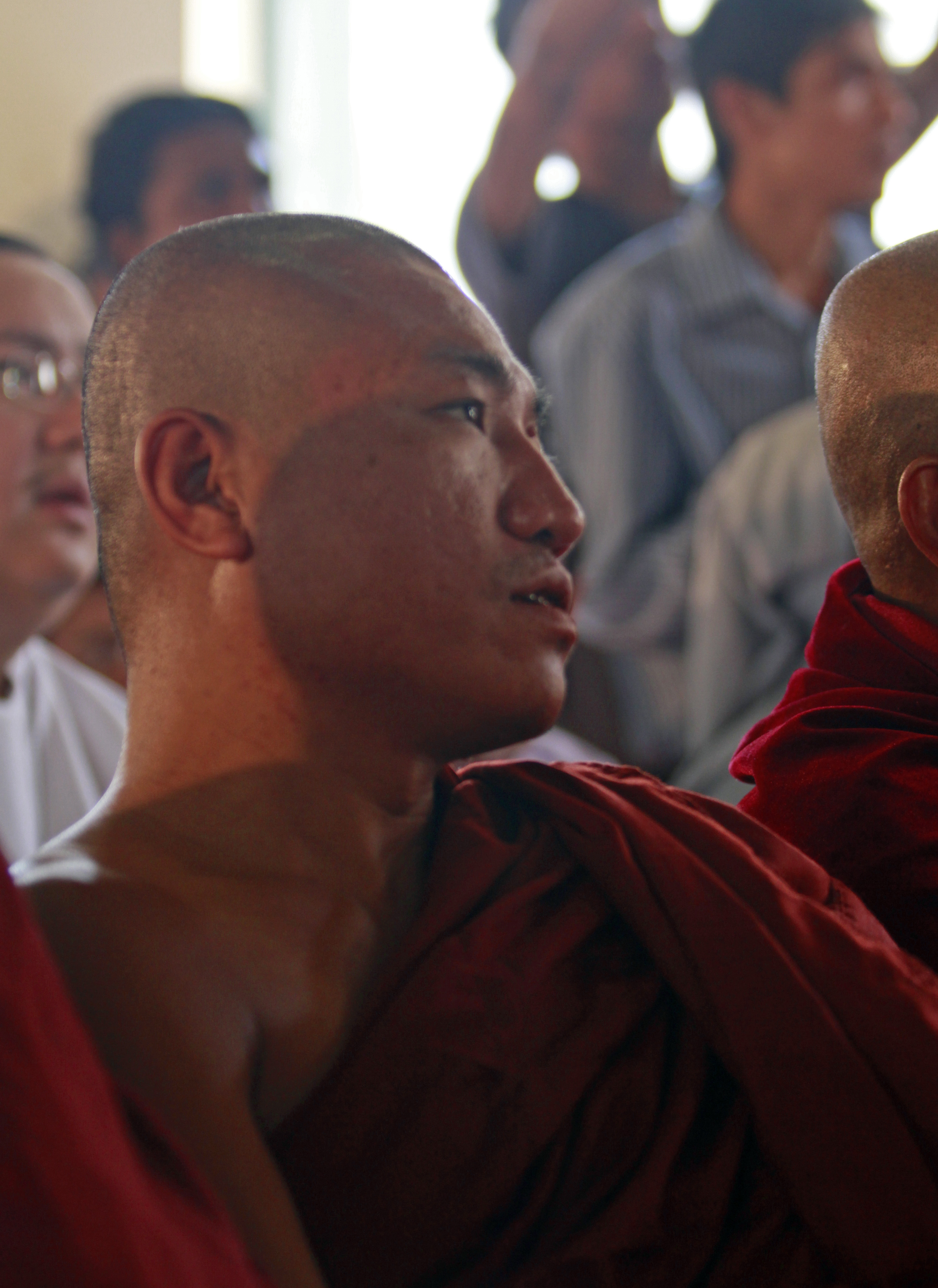
U Gambira, activist and former Buddhist monk

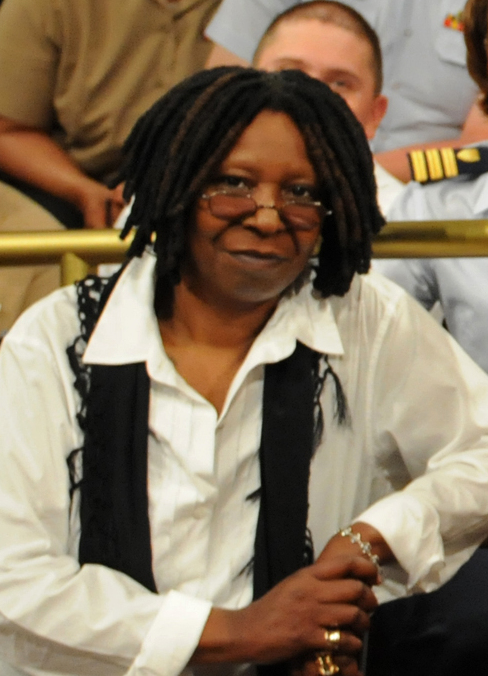
Whoopi Goldberg, American comedian

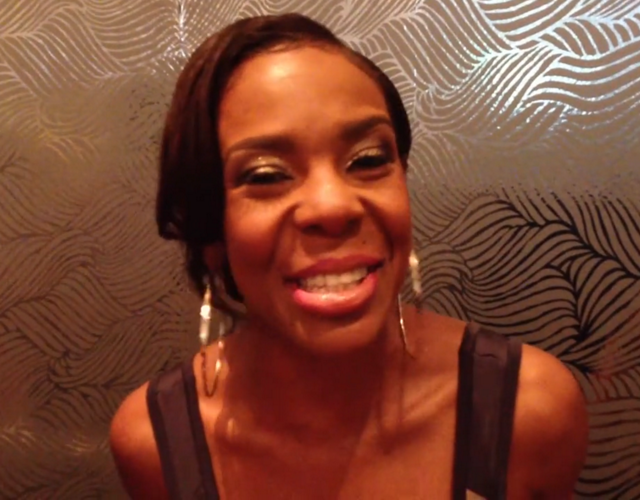
Andrea Kelly, dancer and choreographer

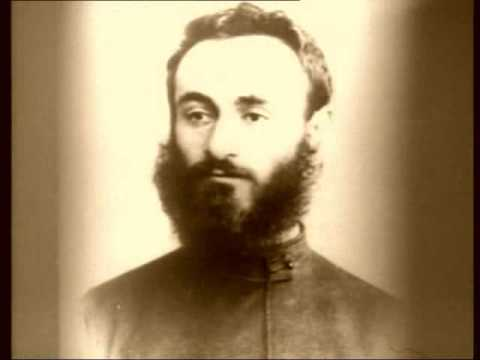
Komitas, priest, musician, and Armenian genocide survivor

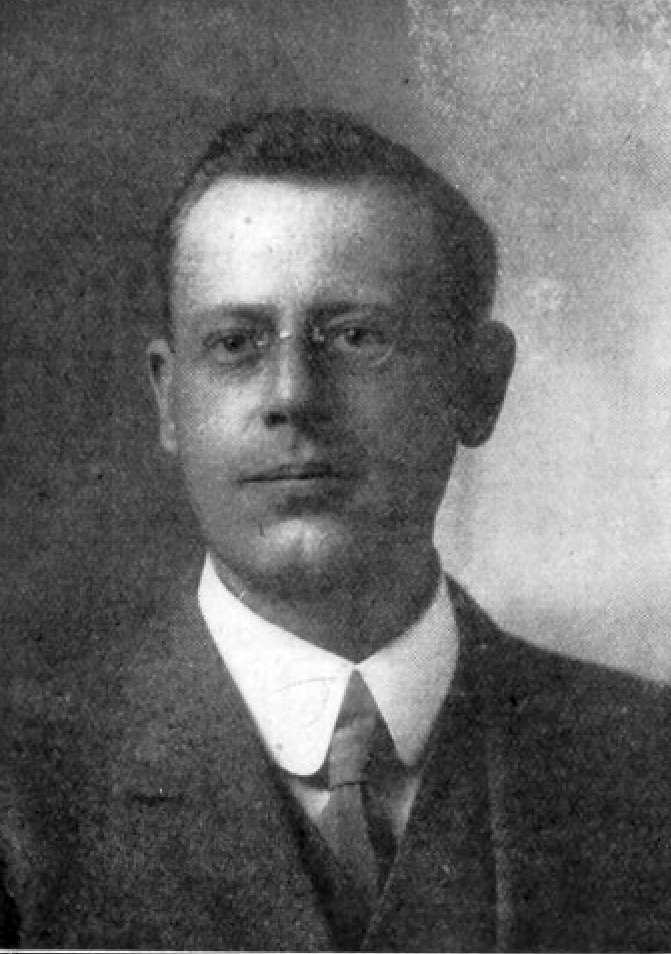
Percival Lancaster, engineer and writer

Primo Levi, chemist

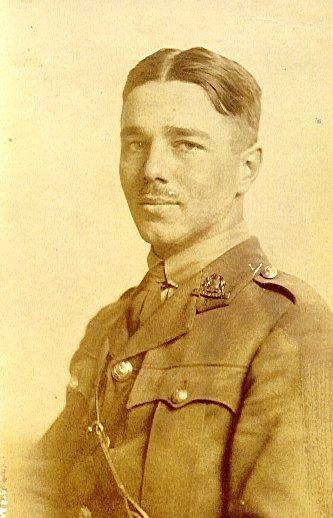
Wilfred Owen, soldier and poet

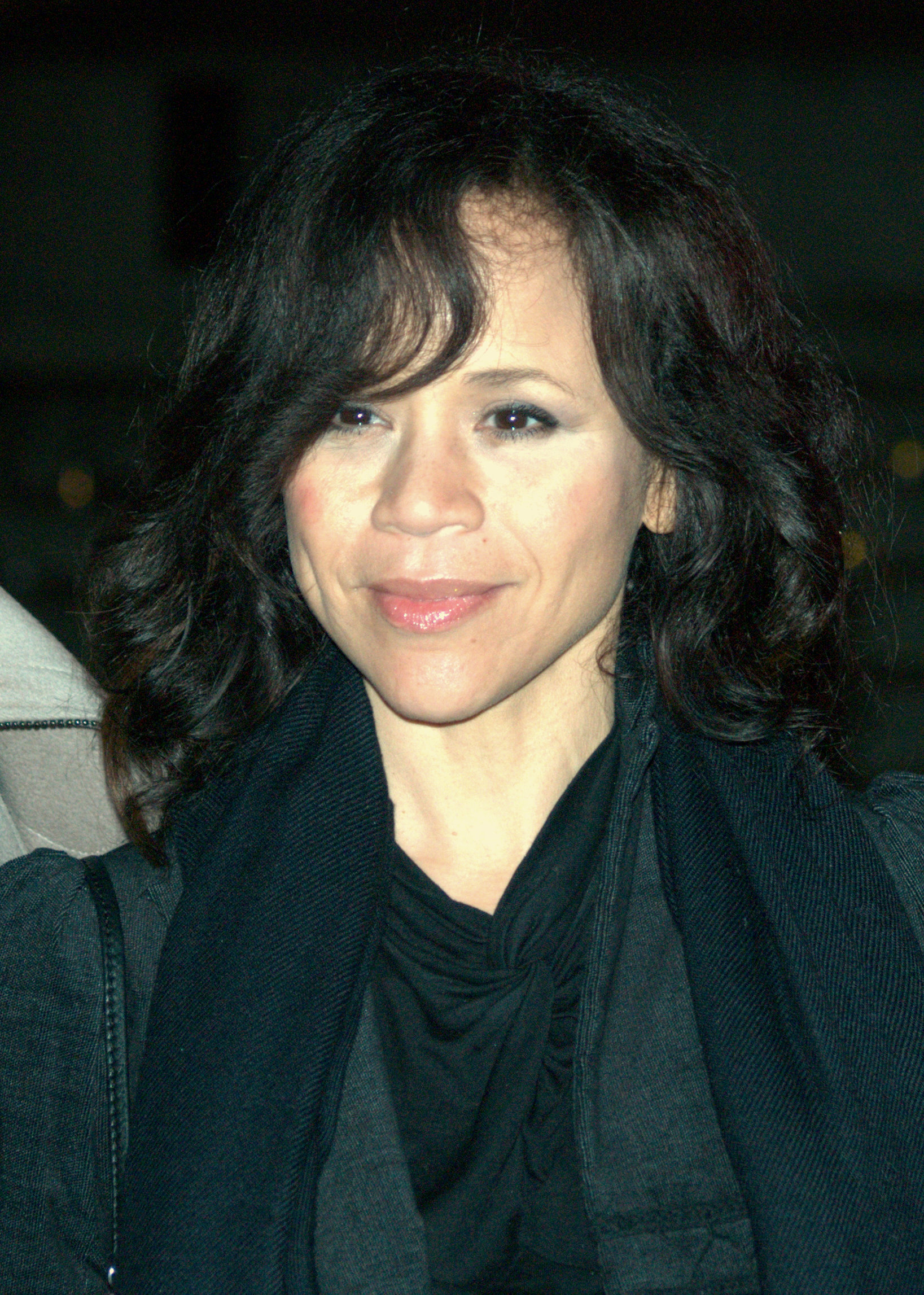
Rosie Perez, actor and activist

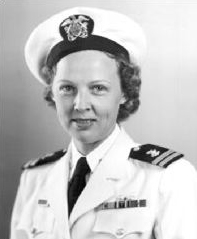
Dorothy Still Danner, war nurse

- Anthony Acevedo (1924–2018), Mexican-American soldier in WWII
- Agar Adamson (1865–1929), Canadian soldier
- Lily Allen (born 1985), British singer
- Denis Avey (1919–2015), British soldier and POW

== B ==
- Mel B (born 1975), English singer-songwriter
- Kelsea Ballerini (born 1993), American singer
- Mischa Barton (born 1986), British-American actor
- Derek Bell (born 1963), English footballer
- Donald Bolduc (born 1962), American soldier and politician
- Kate Bornstein (born 1948), American performance artist and writer
- Gregory Boyington (1912–1988), American aviator and World War Two fighter ace. Never diagnosed, but he displayed all the classical symptoms of PTSD. He once said Show me a hero and I'll show you a bum.
- Abigail Breslin (born 1996), American actor and singer
- Jasper Brett (1895–1917), Irish rugby player
- Kylar Broadus (born 1963), American attorney
- Joseph Brodak, American bank robber
- Adrien Brody (born 1973), American actor
- Chris Brown (born 1989), American singer-songwriter
- Damien Brown (born 1984), Australian mixed martial artist
- Nish Bruce (1956–2002), British Army soldier and skydiver
- Steve Buscemi (born 1957), American actor
- Germán Busch (1903–1939), Bolivian military officer and 36th president of Bolivia

== C ==
- Pedro Cano (1920–1952), Mexican-American soldier in WWII
- Joseph Cao (born 1967), Vietnamese-American politician
- Lynda Cash (born 1949 or 1950), British Royal Navy sailor
- William H. Christian (1825–1887), American Brigadier General during the Civil War
- Circuit Des Yeux (born 1988), American vocalist, composer, and singer-songwriter
- Daisy Coleman (1997–2020), American activist for sexual assault victims
- Kayden Coleman (born 1986), American social media influencer and transgender rights advocate
- Roger Cooper, British businessman
- Leela Corman (born 1972), American cartoonist
- Charly Cox (born 1995), British mental health activist
- Chris Cramer (1948–2021), British news journalist and executive
- James Credle (1945–2023), American activist for veterans and LGBT people

== D ==
- Roméo Dallaire (born 1946), Canadian humanitarian and politician
- Tony Dell (born 1945), Australian cricketer
- Norbert Denef (born 1949), German advocate against sex abuse in the Roman Catholic church
- Beth Dobbin (born 1994), Scottish sprinter
- Mark L. Donald (born 1967), American Navy SEAL
- Taylor Dumpson (born 1995 or 1996), American attorney.
- Alastair Duncan (1952–2016), British Army officer

== E ==
- Lynndie England (born 1982), American war criminal who participated in the Abu Ghraib torture and prisoner abuse
- Rubén Espinosa (1983–2015), Mexican photographer and journalist
- Sara Evans (born 1971), American singer-songwriter

== F ==
- George Farmer, British acuascaper
- Luis Fonseca (born 1980), American Navy hospital corpsman
- Stephanie Foo (born 1987), Malaysian-American radio journalist and author
- Kelly Fraser (1993–2019), Canadian Inuk singer

== G ==
- Catherine Galliford (born 1966 or 1967), Canadian RCMP corporal
- Lorena Gallo (born 1969), American domestic violence victim advocate acquitted of cutting off her husband's penis
- Jimmy Galt (1885–1935), Scottish footballer
- U Gambira (born 1979), Burmese activist and former Buddhist monk
- Abbie Gardner-Sharp (1843–1921), American kidnapping survivor who wrote a memoir about her experience
- Connie Glynn (born 1994), English Internet personality
- Whoopi Goldberg (born 1955), American actor, comedian, and author
- Ariana Grande (born 1993), American singer-songwriter
- Robert Graves (1895–1985), British poet, novelist, and critic
- Dror Green (born 1954), Israeli-Bulgarian writer
- Stéphane Grenier, Canadian military officer and writer
- Matt Gresham (born 1988), Australian singer-songwriter

== H ==
- Darrell Hammond (born 1955), American comedian and actor
- David Haigh, British lawyer
- Craig Harrison (born 1974), British sniper
- Angel Haze (born 1991), American rapper and singer
- Zoe Helene (born 1964), American ecofeminist and advocate of psychedelic drugs
- Carle Hessay (1911–1978), German-Canadian painter
- David Hogg (born 2000), American gun control activist
- Jose L. Holguin (1921–1994), American WWII veteran
- Mandy Horvath (born 1993), American mountaineer
- Francine Hughes (1947–2017), American woman acquitted of murdering her abusive husband (battered woman syndrome)

== J ==
- Harry Jackson (1924–2011), American artist
- Paris Jackson (born 1998), American model, actor, singer, and musician
- Oliver Jackson-Cohen (born 1986), English actor. His mental health challenges have informed how he plays different characters.
- Jameela Jamil (born 1986), English actor and activist
- Abd Al Rahim Abdul Rassak Janko (born 1977), Kurdish man detained at Guantanamo
- Daniel Johns (born 1979), Australian musician and singer-songwriter
- Dwight H. Johnson (1947–1971), American veteran who received the Medal of Honor

== K ==
- Jason Kander (born 1981), American attorney and politician
- Shalini Kantayya, filmmaker and environmental activist
- Fergal Keane (born 1961), Irish journalist
- Andrea Kelly (born 1974), American choreographer, dancer, and actor
- Jacqueline Kennedy (1929–1994), American socialite and first lady
- Sue Klebold (born 1949), American author and activist
- Keira Knightley (born 1985), English actor
- Alicia Kozakiewicz (born 1988), American motivational speaker and missing persons advocate

== L ==
- Shia LaBeouf (born 1986), American actor
- Lady Gaga (born 1986), American singer-songwriter and actor
- Erika Renee Land (born 1983), American writer
- Ernie LaPointe (born 1948), Lakota author
- Percival Lancaster (1880–1937), British civil engineer and writer
- Janet Leach, English social worker
- Left at London (born 1996), American singer-songwriter
- Robin Lehner (born 1991), Swedish ice hockey player
- Primo Levi (1919–1987), Italian Jewish chemist and writer
- Lisa-Jayne Lewis (born 1977), British broadcaster
- Lawrence Lindell (born 1988), American cartoonist
- Linda Lovelace (1949–2002), American pornographic actor who became an anti-pornography activist later in life

== M ==
- Clint Malarchuk (born 1961), Canadian ice hockey player
- Gabriel Mac, American author and journalist
- Neil Mackay (born 1969 or 1970), Northern Irish journalist, author, and filmmaker
- Aimee Mann (born 1960), American singer-songwriter
- Catherine Mardon, Canadian writer and activist
- Hans-Joachim Marseille (1919–1942), German Luftwaffe fighter pilot
- Robert Mason (born 1942), American veteran and author
- AnnaLynne McCord (born 1987), American actor, model, and activist
- David McBride (born 1963), Australian soldier and whistleblower who leaked evidence of Australian war crimes during the War in Afghanistan
- John McGavock Grider (1893–1918), American fighter pilot in WWI
- Ronnie McNutt (1987–2020), American man who committed suicide on a Facebook livestream
- Thomas Melville Lunan (1878–?), Scottish architect
- James Blake Miller (born 1984), American marine who fought in the Iraq War
- Joseph Daniel Miller (born 1964), American serial killer (according to defense attorney)
- Sharee Miller (born 1971), American criminal
- Walter M. Miller Jr. (1923–1996), American science fiction writer
- Luis Carlos Montalvan (1973–2016), American soldier and writer
- Devin Moore (born 1985), American murderer
- David Morgan (born 1947), British Navy and RAF pilot
- Philip Morris (born 1968), English kidnapping victim
- Seth Moulton (born 1978), American politician
- Benedict Joseph Murdoch (1886–1973), Canadian priest and writer
- Audie Murphy (1925–1971), American actor, soldier, and songwriter

== N ==
- Joseph B. Noil (1841–1882), Canadian-American Navy sailor
- Brandy Norwood (born 1979), American singer-songwriter, record producer, and model

== O ==
- Llew O'Brien (born 1972), Australian politician
- Sinéad O'Connor, (1966–2023), Irish singer-songwriter and activist (complex PTSD)
- Rasmea Odeh (born 1947 or 1948), Palestinian-Jordanian implicated in the 1969 PFLP bombings in Jerusalem
- Chris Opie (born 1987), British cyclist
- Wilfred Owen (1893–1918), English poet and soldier
- Alex Owumi (born 1984), Nigerian-American basketball player

== P ==
- José Padilla (born 1970), American criminal
- Robert Park (born 1981), American missionary and activist
- Samuel Pepys (1633–1703), English diarist and naval administrator
- Rosie Perez (born 1964), American actor, choreographer, and dancer
- Christa Pike (born 1976), American convicted murderer.
- Georg-Andreas Pogany (born 1971), German-American soldier and activist
- Noa Pothoven (2001–2019), Dutch activist and author

== Q ==
- Ali Shallal al-Qaisi (born 1962), Iraqi detained and tortured in Abu Ghraib prison during American occupation

== R ==
- James Rhodes (born 1975), British-Spanish pianist and writer
- Emma Roddick (born 1997), Scottish politician
- Michele Ross (born 1982), American neuroscientist, author, and media personality
- Jan Ruff O'Herne (1923–2019), Indonesian-Australian human rights activist and survivor of war rape
- Salman Rushdie (born 1947), author who survived being stabbed

== S ==
- J. D. Salinger (1919–2010), American writer
- Ahmad Naser Sarmast, Afghan-Australian ethnomusicologist
- Siegfried Sassoon (1886–1967), English war poet and writer
- Janina Scarlet (born 1983), Ukrainian-American Jewish author and psychologist
- Jan Scruggs (born 1950), American veteran of the Vietnam War and founder of a nonprofit
- Geoff Shaw (born c. 1945), Australian Aboriginal (Arrernte/Kaytetye) community leader
- Gail Sheehy (1936–2020), American author, journalist, and lecturer
- Sadhvi Siddhali Shree (born 1983), American activist
- Paul Shuey (born 1970), American baseball player
- Sia (born 1975), Australian singer-songwriter
- Lodune Sincaid (1973–2019), American mixed martial artist
- Emma Slade (born 1966), British public speaker
- Dr. Charles Smith (born 1940), American sculptor and minister
- Merriman Smith (1913–1970), American journalist
- Soghoman Soghomian (1869–1935), commonly known as Komitas; Ottoman Armenian priest, musician, and musicologist who survived the Armenian genocide
- Daniel Somers (1983–2013), American soldier in the Iraq War whose suicide note went viral
- Junior J. Spurrier (1922–1984), American veteran of WWII
- Hans-Arnold Stahlschmidt (1920–1942), German Luftwaffe pilot
- Alexandra Stan (born 1989), Romanian singer-songwriter
- Stefan Steć (1964–2005), Polish UN peacekeeper
- Heinrich Stegemann (1888–1945), German painter and sculptor
- James Stephanie Sterling (born 1984), English-American YouTuber and wrestler
- Dorothy Still Danner (1914–2001), American Navy nurse in WWII
- Julius Strauss (born 1968), British journalist and wilderness guide
- Erica Sullivan (born 2000), Olympic swimmer representing the USA
- Charles Sumner (1811–1874), American politician
- Anthony Swofford (born 1970), American writer

== T ==
- Jack Hendrick Taylor (1909–1959), American Navy officer and concentration camp survivor
- Claude AnShin Thomas (born 1947), American Zen Buddhist monk and Vietnam War veteran
- Hugh Thompson Jr. (1943–2006), American army major credited with ending the Mỹ Lai massacre
- Gunvald Tomstad (1918–1970), Norwegian resistance member during WWII
- Mary L. Trump (born 1965), American psychologist and author
- Houston Tumlin (1992–2021), American actor

== V ==
- Rachelle Vinberg (born 1998), American skateboarder and actor
- Kurt Vonnegut (1922–2007), American author, veteran, and POW
- Prvoslav Vujcic (born 1960), Serbian Canadian writer

== W ==
- Sam Wadsworth (1896–1961), English footballer
- Nico Walker (born 1985), American writer
- John Walsh (born 1960), American politician
- Esmé Weijun Wang, American writer
- Massey Whiteknife, Canadian businessperson and producer
- Lucy Wicks (born 1973), Australian politician
- Denis Wigan (1893–1958), English cricketer
- Tom Wills (1835–1880), Australian sportsman
- Ron Wilson (born 1954), Northern Irish-Australian TV and radio news presenter
- Alex Winter (born 1965), British-American actor and filmmaker
- Bogdan-Dawid Wojdowski (1930–1994), Polish Jewish writer
- Brianna Wu (born 1971), American video game developer and computer programmer

== Y ==
- Will Young (born 1979), British singer-songwriter and actor
- Tiffany Yu (born 1988), American entrepreneur and activist

== Z ==
- Keith Zettlemoyer (1955–1995), American murderer

== See also ==
- List of people with bipolar disorder
- List of people with schizophrenia
