= Denef =

Denef is a surname. Notable people with the surname include:

- Jan Denef (born 1951), Belgian mathematician
- Norbert Denef (born 1949), German abuse victim
