= Lober (Mulde) =

River in Germany

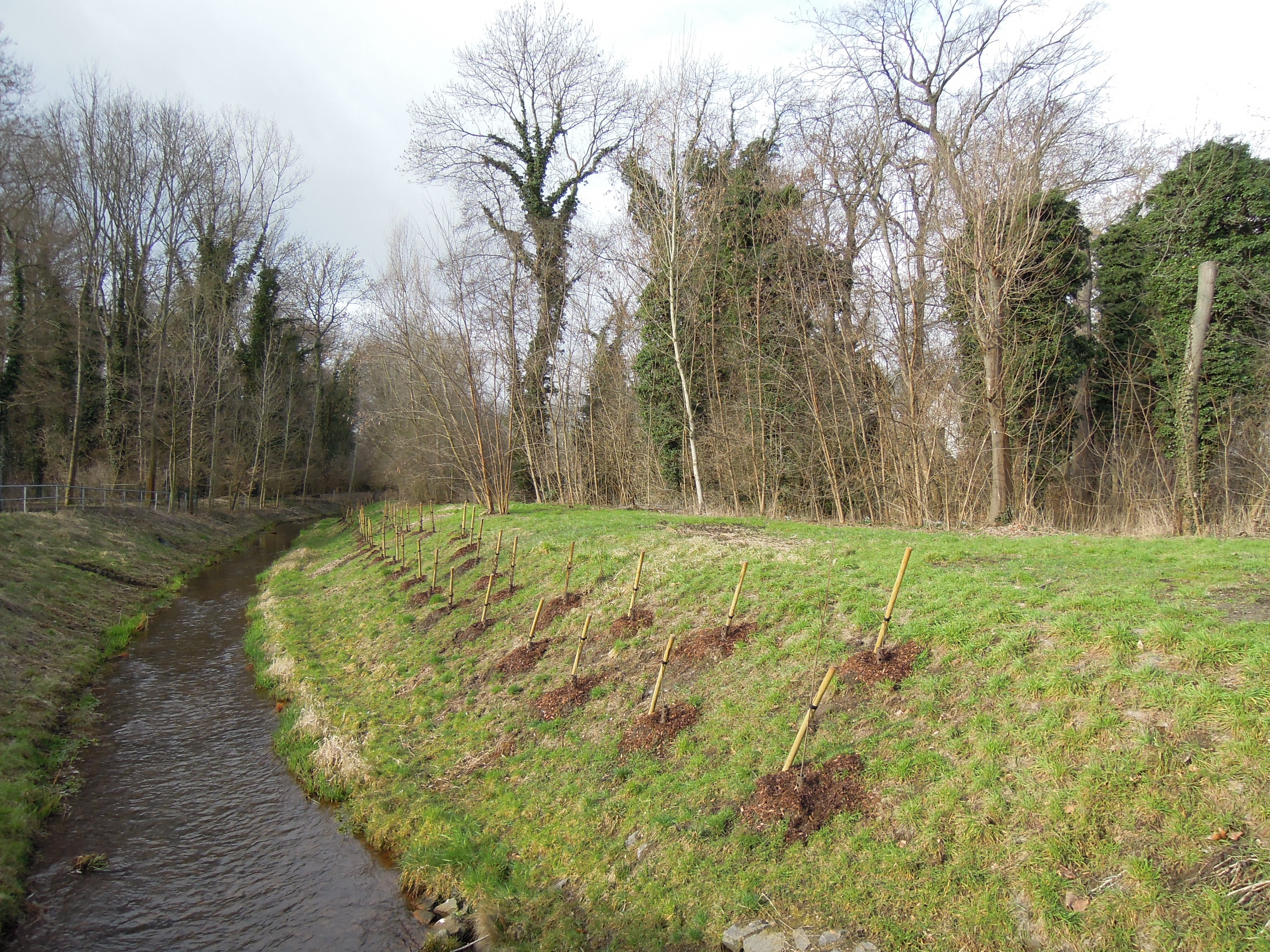
- Lober southwest of the Delitzsch city park, March 2023

Location
- Country: Germany
- States: Saxony; Saxony-Anhalt

Physical characteristics
- Source
  - location: South of Zschölkau
  - coordinates: 51.43°N 12.4147°E
- Mouth
  - location: Mulde
  - coordinates: 51.6067°N 12.4314°E
- Length: approximately 20 km (originally about 30 km)

Basin features
- Progression: Mulde→ Elbe→ North Sea
- River system: Elbe

The Lober is a river of Saxony and Saxony-Anhalt, Germany. It flows into the Mulde near Pouch. Its course has been heavily affected by lignite mining; its lower course is a canal, also called Lober-Leine-Kanal. The Lober flows through the town Delitzsch.

== Name ==
The name could have been derived from the Germanic root *alba- for 'gravel' with an r-suffix and then Slavicized to *Labar-. The meaning would therefore have been "river with a gravelly bed".

== Course changes ==
The course of the Lober was changed several times to allow the expansion of lignite mining.

== See also ==
- List of rivers of Saxony
- List of rivers of Saxony-Anhalt
