= Joachim Fritsche =

German footballer (born 1951)

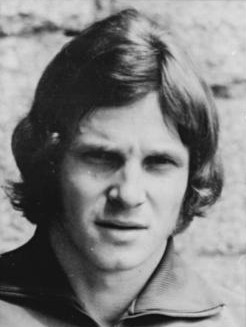
- Fritsche in 1974

Personal information
- Date of birth: 28 October 1951 (age 75)
- Place of birth: Delitzsch, East Germany
- Height: 1.80 m (5 ft 11 in)
- Position: Left-back

Youth career
- 1962–1968: BSG Traktor Delitszsch
- 1968–1970: 1. FC Lokomotive Leipzig

Senior career*
Years	Team	Apps	(Gls)
1970–1981	1. FC Lokomotive Leipzig	245	(24)
1981–1985	BSG Chemie Leipzig	36	(5)
1985–1989	TSG Chemie Markkleeburg	85	(7)
Total		366	(36)

International career
1973–1977	East Germany	14	(0)

Managerial career
- FSV Grün-Weiß Eilenburg
- * Club domestic league appearances and goals

Joachim Fritsche (born 28 October 1951) is a German former professional footballer who played as a left-back. He was part of the East Germany national team for their only World Cup appearance in West Germany 1974. He earned a total of 14 caps during his career. Fritsche played in the East German top-flight for 1. FC Lokomotive Leipzig and BSG Chemie Leipzig.

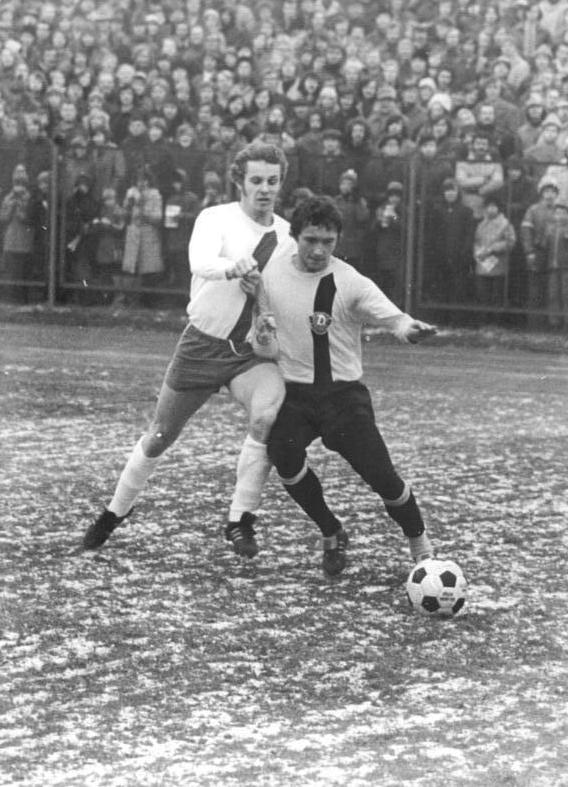
Fritsche (left) challenges Gerd Weber, of SG Dynamo Dresden in 1975.
