= Chris Kilham =

Writer on plant-based medicines

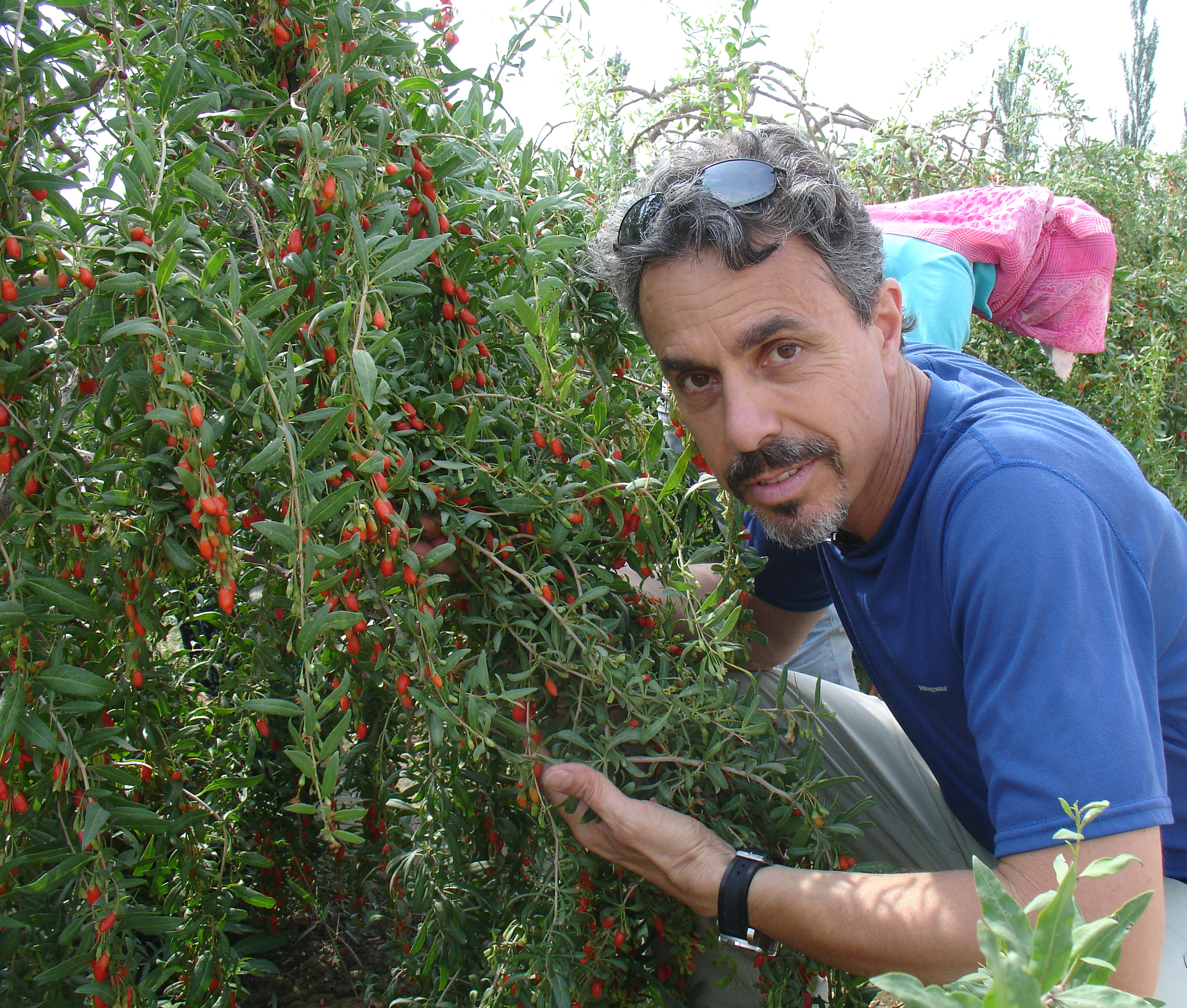
- Medicine Hunter Chris Kilham in Ningxia, China, with Goji Berry, 2010
- Born: Christopher Scott Kilham; July 22, 1952 (age 74); Boston, Massachusetts, U.S.
- Occupations: Medicine Hunter, TV Personality, Educator, Author
- Spouse: Zoe Helene (2007–present)
- Website: www.medicinehunter.com

Chris Kilham (born July 22, 1952) is an author, educator, and researcher of plant-based medicines. He is known for his appearances on Fox News as the "Medicine Hunter".

== Early life ==
Chris Kilham was born and raised in a family of ministers, broadcasts and public speaking professionals. He is the son of Elizabeth Scalise Kilham “Bette Day” (1925-2006) and Gene Kilham (1919-1971). Bette Day was one of the first female television broadcasters at Boston's WBZ-TV and also worked as a radio disc jockey. Gene Kilham worked in broadcasting and as a songwriter. His grandfather, Rev. Dr. Victor Scalise graduated Yale Divinity School in 1932. Kilham's uncle and first cousin are both Baptist ministers.

Kilham's first live broadcast appearance was at the age of 7 and worked as a commercial actor in his youth.

Kilham married Zoe Helene in 2007.

== Work ==
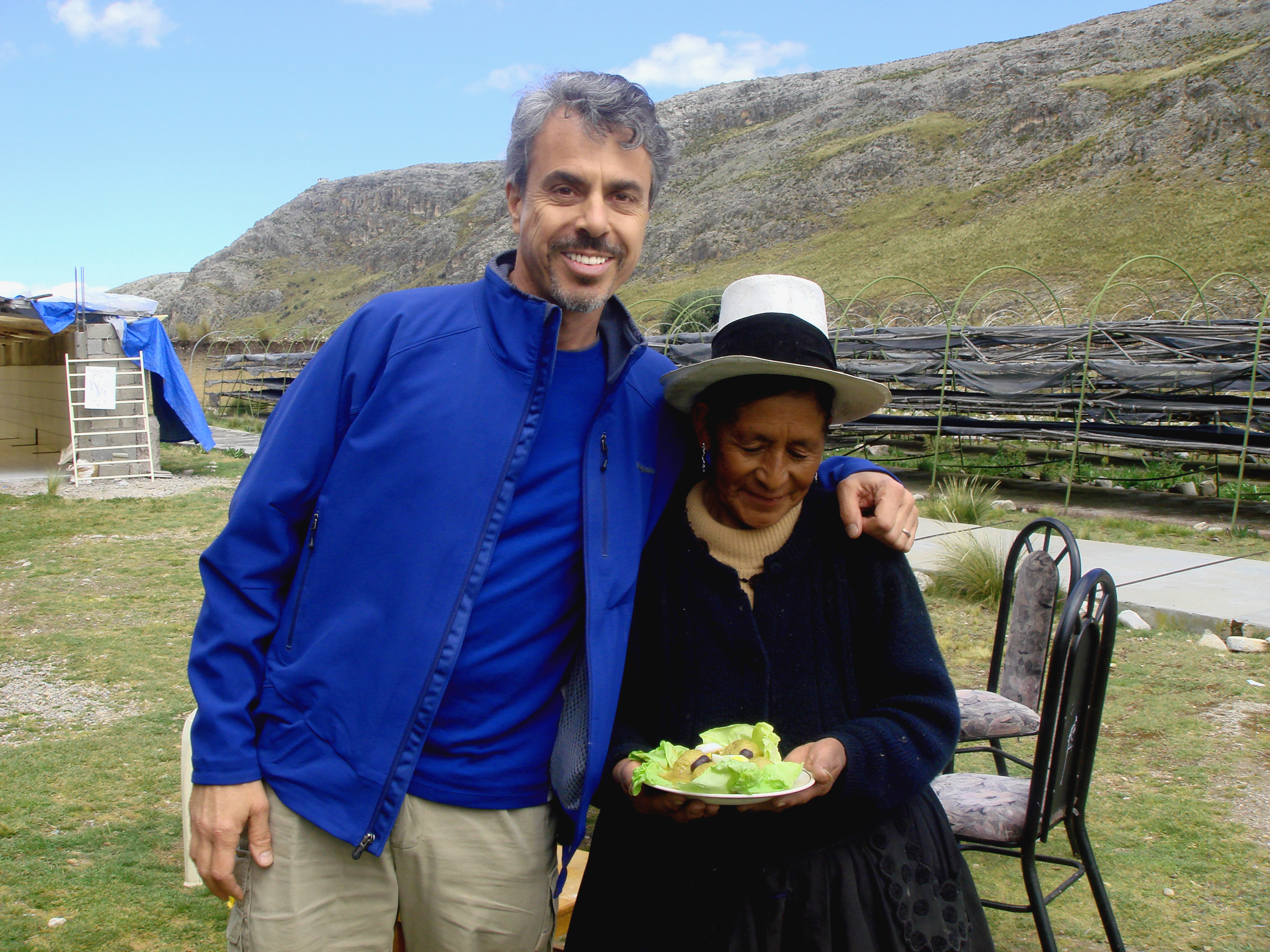
Chris Kilham with Shaman Dona Sophia and Maca

=== Plant medicine ===
Founded by Kilham, Medicine Hunter sources medicinal plants and organizes cultivation and trade with indigenous peoples. Kilham's wife is a partner in the company.

Kilham has conducted research on the following plants:

- Ayahuasca as an addiction treatment.
- Rhodiola rosea for reducing cortisol levels, reducing stress, improving mental function, and enhancing libido.
- Tongkat ali as an aphrodisiac and for balancing both male and female hormones.
- Dragon's blood for skin healing and antioxidant properties.
- Acai as superfood and for antioxidant properties.
- Maca for enhancing energy and sexual function.

Kilham's work with aphrodisiacs has been featured on CNN, The Dr. Oz Show, Good Morning America, The New York Times, The Washington Post, ABC News Nightline, Outside Magazine, and Business Insider.

=== Natural products industry ===
From 1985-1990, Kilham was the Vice President of Marketing for Bread and Circus. In 1990, Kilham founded Cowboy Marketing, a consulting firm for the natural foods industry. His book, Cowboy Marketing: How to Shoot from the Hip and Win on the Wild Frontier of Natural Foods Retailing is about his experiences in the natural foods industry.

=== Cannabis reform ===
Kilham is an activist in the movement to legalize marijuana, and has written about the topic, including the use of cannabis for medicinal purposes and U.S. patent 6.630.507.

Kilham appears in Robyn Grigg Lawerence's 2015 cannabis cookbook, The Cannabis Kitchen Cookbook, He was listed as one of the "Top Cannabis Chefs" in Culture Magazine.

=== Shamanism ===
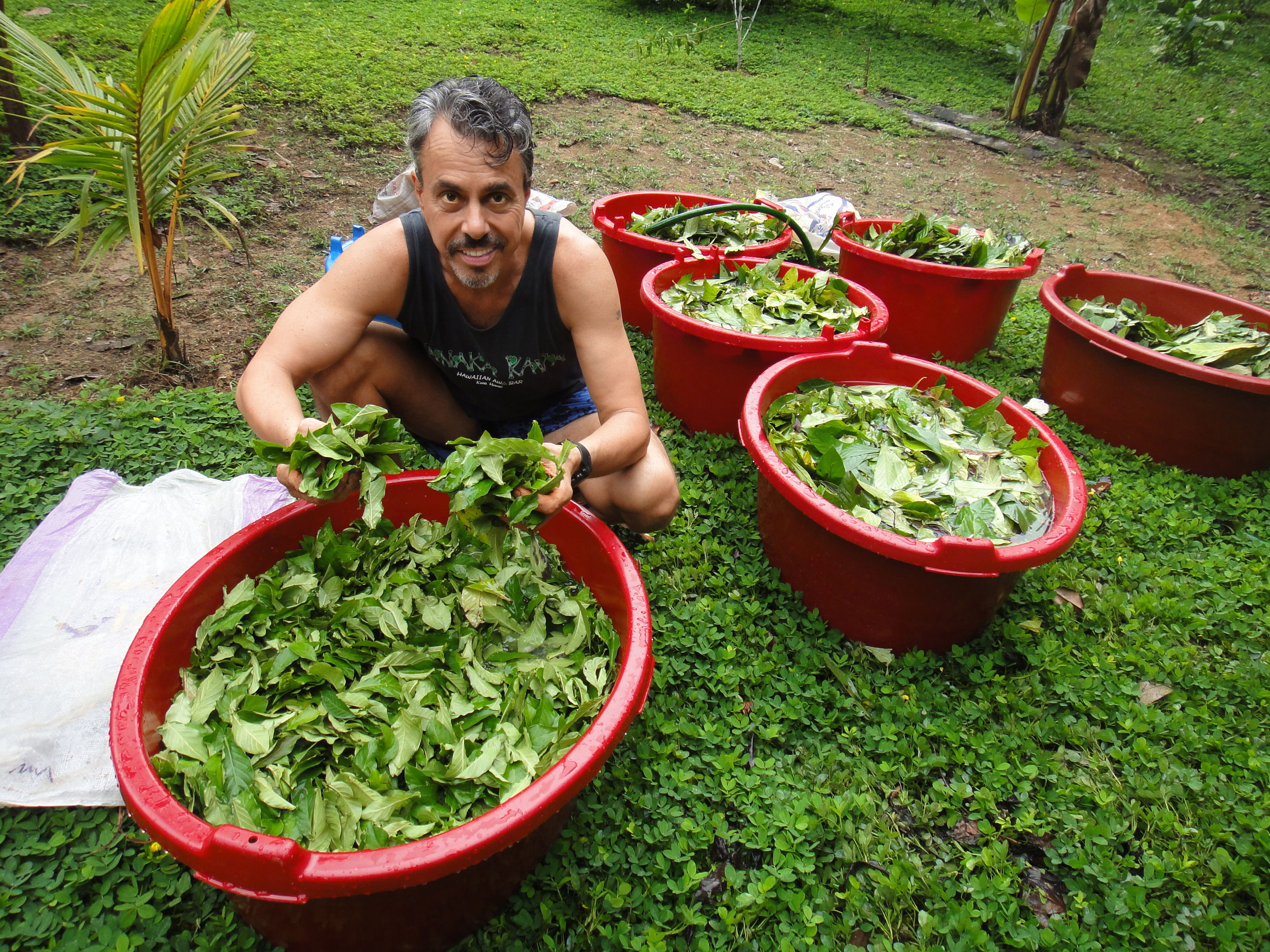
Chris Kilham with Chakruna (Psychotria viridis) leaves in the Peruvian Amazon.

Kilham is recognized as a chief in the South Pacific. He researches and promotes psychoactive and psychedelic plants used in traditional shaman rituals, including kava and ayahuasca. He has written a book about the medicinal qualities of psychoactive and psychedelic plants, entitled Psyche Delicacies: Coffee, Chocolate, Chiles, Kava and Cannabis and Why They're Good for You. Chris' most recent book, The Ayahuasca Test Pilots Handbook - The Essential Guide to Ayahuasca Journeying, has been featured in Newsweek, Boston magazine, and Reset with Amber Lyon. The Ayahuasca Test Pilots Handbook - The Essential Guide to Ayahuasca Journeying is dedicated to Kilham's wife, Zoe Helene, and to the late Ipupiara, Bernardo Dias Peixoto, a shaman. Kilham's Ayahuasca Monologues have received positive reviews Chris is the founder of Ayahuasca Test Pilots, a “collaboration of individuals who engage in the ceremonial practice of ayahuasca journeying with skilled shamans”; his wife, Zoe Helene, serves as “Co-Pilot” for that organisation.

=== Yoga and meditation ===
Kilham is a yoga teacher and conference speaker. Kilham has been featured on The Dr. Oz Show teaching Dr. Mehmet Oz yoga exercises. He has also demonstrated The Five Tibetans on Fox News. His book, The Lotus and The Bud: Cannabis, Consciousness, and Yoga Practice, is a guide to blending cannabis with the practice of yoga.

Kilham is sometimes referred to as the "Psychedelic Yogi". He has a Mind Body Disciplines degree from University of Massachusetts-Amherst, a major that he designed himself.

=== Work with University of Massachusetts ===
Kilham has taught ethnobotany at University of Massachusetts since 2000 and referred to as “Explorer in Residence.” He leads the Shaman's Pharmacy Amazon Field Immersion Course, an expedition to primary rain forest in Peru for students from UMass Amherst, Amherst College, Mount Holyoke College, Hampshire College, and Smith College. Students experience the Amazon while learning about field expedition, sustainability, shamanism, and medicinal plants of the region.

== Books ==
Kilham is the author of fourteen books and numerous publications on medicinal plants, natural products, and yoga, including The Five Tibetans: Five Dynamic Exercises for Health, Energy, and Personal Power and Stalking the Wild Orgasm, which appears in the 1988 movie, Earth Girls Are Easy.

Kilham's other books are:

- The Lotus and The Bud: Cannabis, Consciousness, and Yoga Practice. ( Inner Traditions | Park Street Press, January 2021) – ISBN 9781620559406
- The Ayahuasca Test Pilots Handbook: The Essential Guide to Ayahuasca Journeying. ( North Atlantic Books | Evolver Editions, November 4, 2014) – ISBN 978-1-58394-792-0
- The Five Tibetans: Five Dynamic Exercises for Health, Energy, and Personal Power. (Healing Arts Press; 2nd Edition, New Edition, August 16, 2011) – ISBN 978-1594774447
- Hot Plants: Nature's Proven Sex Boosters for Men and Women. (St. Martin's Press, September 2004) – ISBN 978-0-312-31539-9
- Psyche Delicacies: Coffee, Chocolate, Chiles, Kava and Cannabis, and Why They're Good For You. (Rodale Press, 2001) – ISBN 1-57954-347-2
- Tales from The Medicine Trail: Tracking Down the Health Secrets of Shamans, Herbalists, Mystics, Yogis, and Other Healers. (Rodale Press, 2000) – ISBN 1-57954-185-2
- OPC: The Miracle Antioxidant. (Keats Publishing, Jan. 11, 1998) – ISBN 0-87983-842-6
- Kava: Medicine Hunting in Paradise. (Park Street Press, 1996) – ISBN 0-89281-640-6
- Cowboy Marketing: How to Shoot From the Hip and Win on the Wild Frontier of Natural Foods Retailing. (New Hope Communications, 1993) – ASIN B000E6CS1O
- The Bread & Circus Whole Food Bible: How to Select and Prepare Safe Healthful Foods Without Pesticides or Chemical Additives. (Addison-Wesley, 1991. Revised version: Healing Arts Press, 1996) – ISBN 978-0-89281-626-2
- Inner Power: Secrets from the Tibet and Orient. (Japan Publications, 1988) – ISBN 0-87040-689-2
- In Search Of The New Age: A Humorous Look at an Emerging Culture. (Destiny Books, 1988) – ISBN 978-0-89281-209-7
- Take Charge Of Your Health: Healing with Yogatherapy and Nutrition. (Japan Publications, 1985) – ISBN 0-87040-632-9
- The Complete Shopper's Guide to Natural Foods. (Autumn Press, 1980) – ISBN 0-394-73983-3

== Television and radio ==
Kilham is a frequent guest on The Dr. Oz Show with Dr. Mehmet Oz, appearing on at least 15 occasions from January 2008 to January 2015, and Good Morning America, where he has appeared to discuss herbal remedies, his cocoa sustainability project, and libido boosting plants. Kilham also serves on The Medical Advisory Board of The Dr. Oz Show.

Kilham has appeared as a guest expert on numerous radio and television programs, speaking primarily about medicine hunting, mind/body health and wellness, traditional botanical medicine, sustainability, environmental and cultural preservation and other related topics.
