= Delitzsch =

Town in Saxony, Germany

- Town
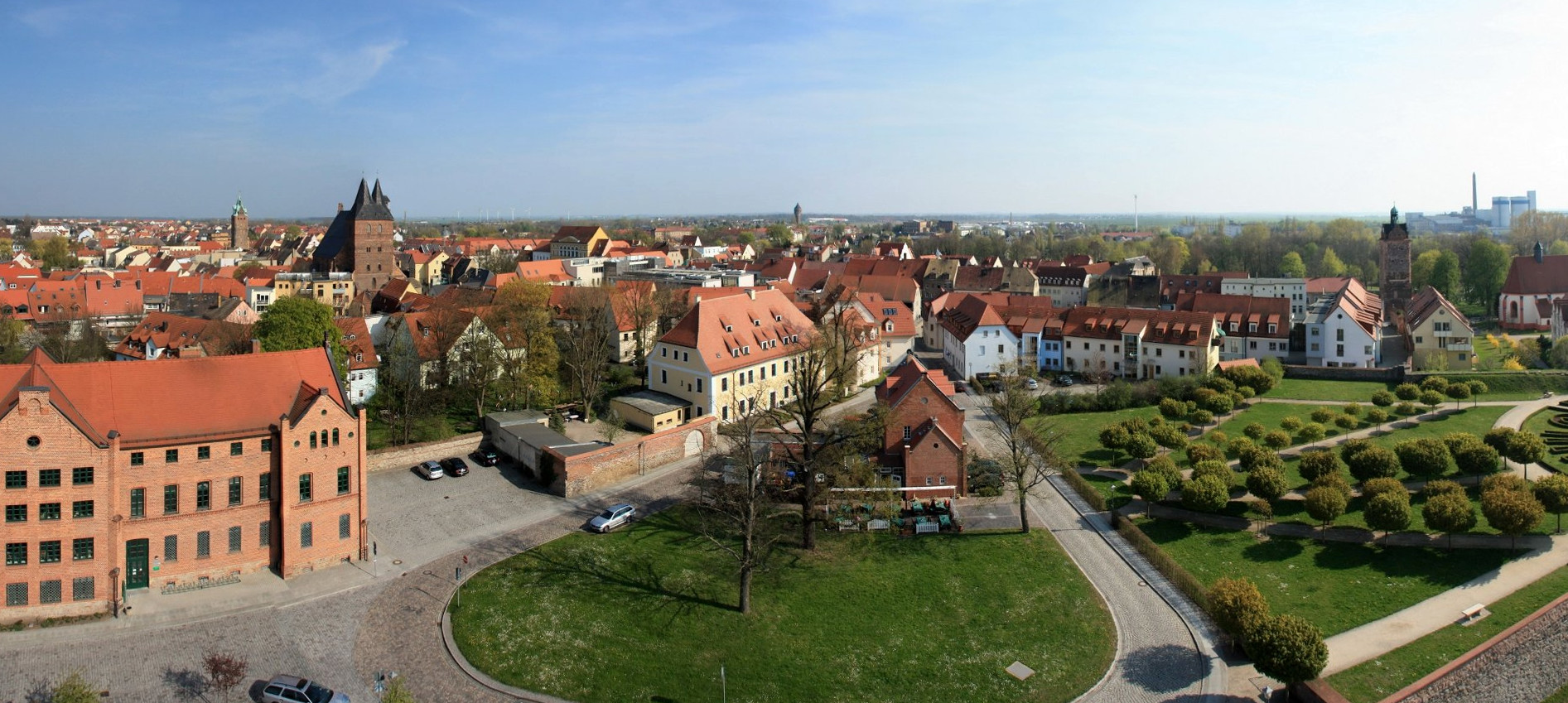
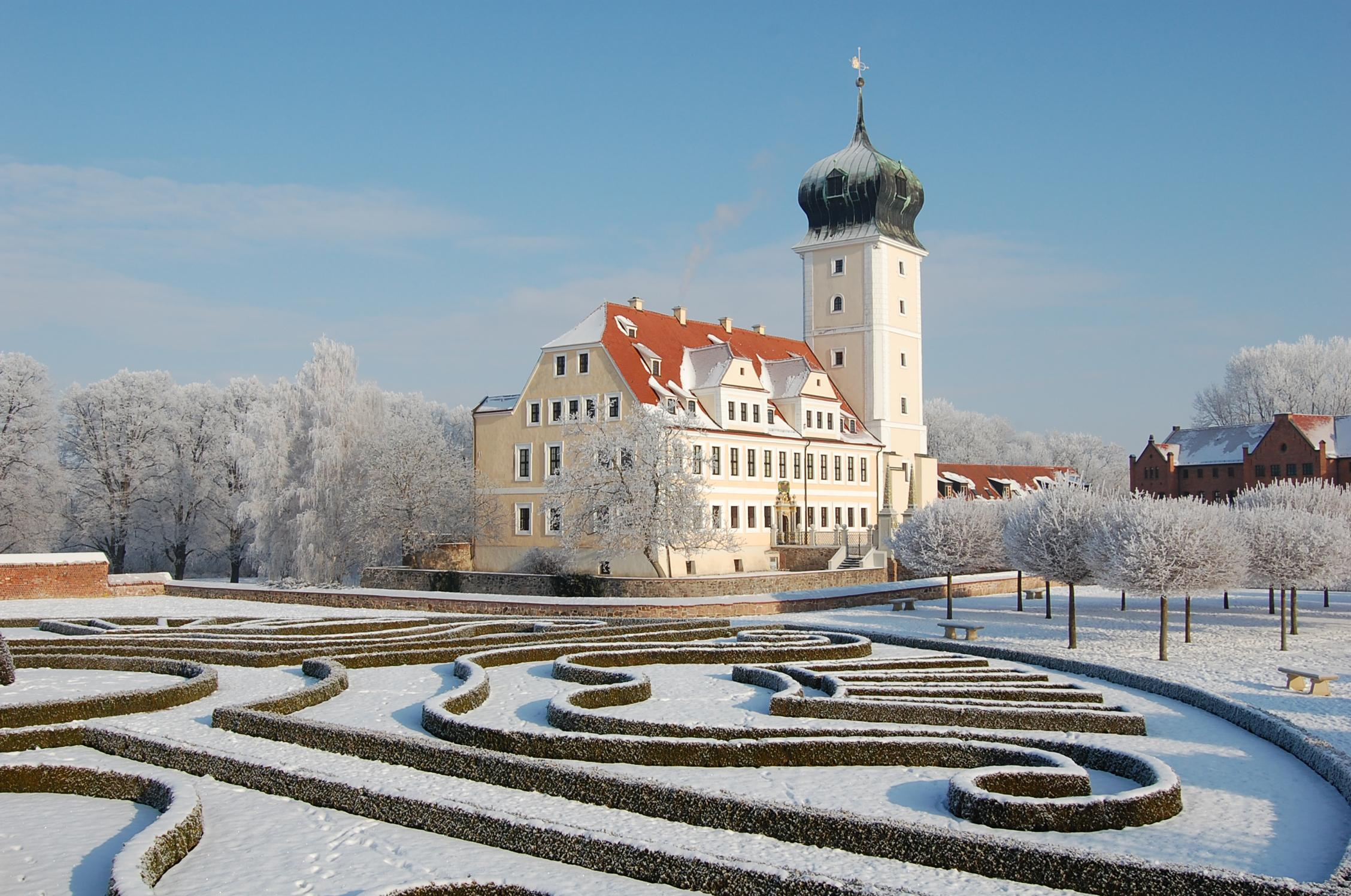
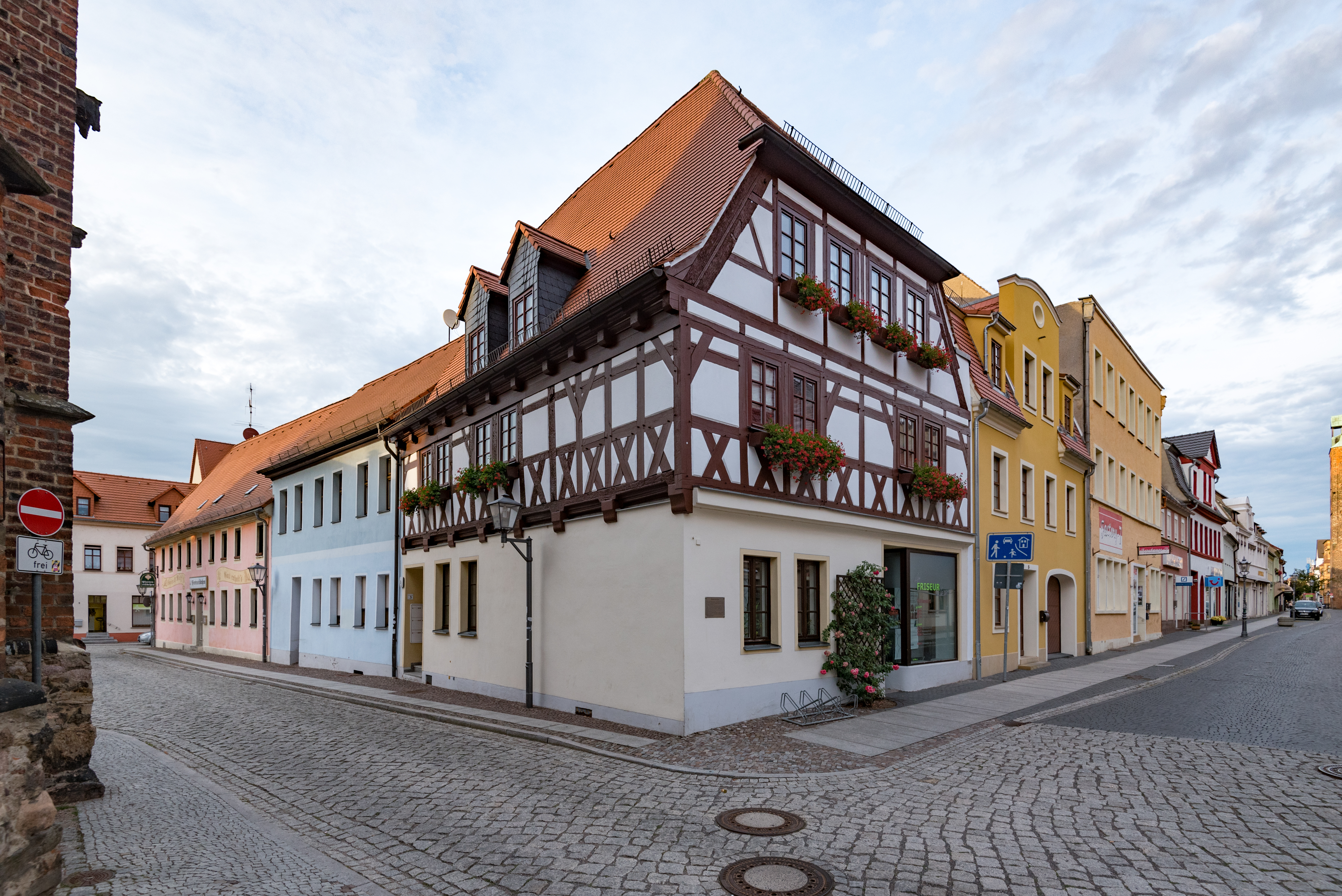
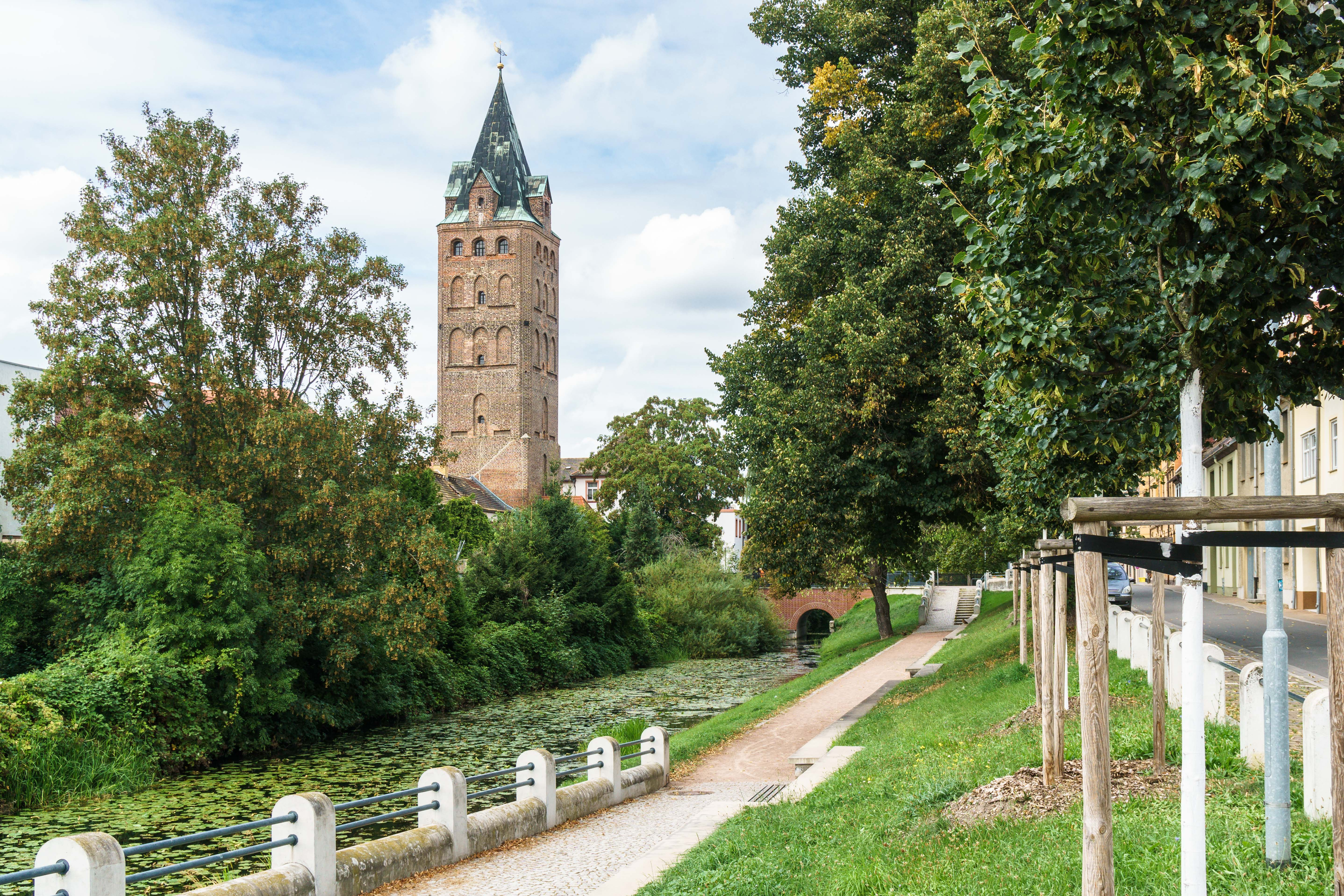
- From top: View over old town, Delitzsch Castle in winter, Breite Straße in the old town, Breiter Turm at Wallgraben

- Coat of arms

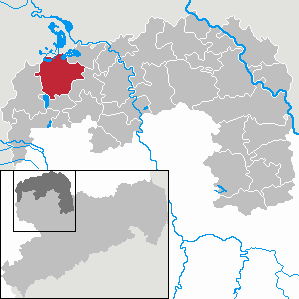
- Location of Delitzsch within Nordsachsen district
- Interactive map of Delitzsch
- Location within Germany Location within Saxony
- Coordinates: 51°31′35″N 12°20′33″E
- Country: Germany
- State: Saxony
- District: Nordsachsen
- Subdivisions: 15 town-quarters

Government
  - Mayor (2022–29): Manfred Wilde (Ind.)

Area
  - Total: 85.92 km^{2} (33.17 sq mi)
- Elevation: 94 m (308 ft)

Population (2025-12-31)
  - Total: 25,750
  - Density: 299.7/km^{2} (776.2/sq mi)
- Time zone: UTC+01:00 (CET)
  - Summer (DST): UTC+02:00 (CEST)
- Postal codes: 04509
- Dialling codes: 034202
- Vehicle registration: TDO, DZ, EB, OZ, TG, TO
- Website: www.delitzsch.de

Delitzsch (German pronunciation: [ˈdeːlɪtʃ]; Slavic: delč or delcz for hill) is a town in Saxony in Germany, 20 km north of Leipzig and 30 km east of Halle (Saale). With 24,850 inhabitants at the end of 2015, it is the largest town in the district of Nordsachsen.

Archaeological evidence outside the town limits points to a settlement dating from the Neolithic Age. The first documented mention of Delitzsch dates from 1166 and it later became the Elector of Saxony's residence in the 17th and 18th centuries. The old town is well preserved, with several plazas, citizens' and patrician houses, towers, a baroque castle and the town's fortifications.

Delitzsch and its surrounding area contain water areas, hiking and cycling networks and nature reserves.

== Geography ==
=== Location ===
Delitzsch is located in the northwestern part of Nordsachsen in Saxony, at an altitude of 94 meters above sea level. Due to its location on the border with Saxony-Anhalt, Delitzsch is the northernmost town in Saxony. It is situated on the north heath and recreation area Goitzsche which extends across the Saxony-Saxony-Anhalt border to Bitterfeld-Wolfen. To the east is the spa town of Bad Düben, which is the starting point for the Düben Heath.

The total size of the urban area is 83.57 square kilometres (32.27 square miles). The north–south extension is 10 kilometres (6 miles) and the east–west extension 8.3 kilometres (5.2 miles). The adjacent communities are Löbnitz, Schönwölkau, Rackwitz and Neukyhna clockwise called from the north of town.

=== Districts ===
Name of the District	Area in km^{2}	Population at September 2011 (Main domicile)	Density inhabitants/km^{2}
Delitzsch with Gertitz, Kertitz and Werben	38.04	20,974	551
Beerendorf	2.38	585	246
Benndorf	3.62	382	106
Brodau	3.16	314	99
Döbernitz	1.17	833	712
Laue	5.22	203	39
Poßdorf	7.78	66	8
Rödgen	4.12	224	54
Schenkenberg	2.43	832	342
Selben	3.33	664	199
Spröda	6,42	287	45
Storkwitz	3.59	150	42
Zschepen	2.31	407	176
Overall	83.57	25,921	310

== History ==
Delitzsch was founded as a town around 1200 AD (according to chronicles) and became recognized as a city in 1300 AD. Both before and after its founding, the city fought off many invaders: first the Slavic tribes who had lived there before the city was founded and then, later, in the Thirty Years' War (1618–1648), the Swedes. A legend arose from this final encounter with the Swedes, saying that when the Swedes reached the river Lober, the tower warden's daughter spied them and blew a trumpet, allowing the citizens of the town to get to safety and prepare, and as a result the invaders were defeated. Every year there is a historical medieval style fair to celebrate this victory over the Swedes and, during the fair, shops are open on Sundays.

As a result of the Congress of Vienna in 1814–15, Delitzsch was granted to Prussia from the Kingdom of Saxony. A district of Delitzsch was established for administrative purposes. From 1815 to 1944, Delitzsch was part of the Prussian Province of Saxony, from 1944 to 1945 of the Province of Halle-Merseburg, from 1945 to 1952 of the State of Saxony-Anhalt, from 1952 to 1990 of the Bezirk Leipzig of East Germany and since 1990 of Saxony.

In World War II (1939–1945), only one building, the station, was burned, minimal damage in comparison with many other German urban centers.

According to a 1996 census, Delitzsch had more than 27,000 inhabitants.

=== Historical population ===
==== 1747–1999 ====
(using town boundaries as at the time)

Date	Population
1747	390 houses, 70 ½ Oxgangs
1789	2,500
1818	2,953
31 December 1837 ¹	4,332
31 December 1841 ¹	4,533
31 December 1871 ¹	8,111
31 December 1880 ¹	8,225
31 December 1890 ¹	8,949
31 December 1895 ¹	9,560
31 December 1910 ¹	13,031
31 December 1925 ¹	14,892

Date	Population
31 December 1933 ¹	16,476
31 December 1938	17,931
31 December 1939 ¹	18,016
29 October 1946	25,148
31 August 1950 ²	24,195
31 December 1960	22,892
31 December 1964	23,336
31 December 1970	24,435
31 December 1980	25,248
31 December 1984	27,953
31 December 1988	28,384

Date	Population
31 December 1990	27,051
31 December 1991	26,534
31 December 1992	26,249
31 December 1993	25,828
31 December 1994 ²	26,045
31. December 1995	25,762
31 December 1996 ²	25,579
31 December 1997	27,235
31 December 1998	26,963
31 December 1999	26,704

¹ Census
² Merging districts

Source: Statistisches Landesamt des Freistaates Sachsen

=== 2000–present ===
(using town boundaries as at the time)

Date	Population	Moving in	Moving out	Births	Deaths	Change
31 December 2000	26,331	933	1251	203	258	-373
31 December 2001	25,774	891	1366	197	279	-557
31 December 2002	25,573	1202	1322	195	276	-201
31 December 2003	25,287	998	1150	170	306	-286
31 December 2004 ¹	28,001	990	1070	209	328	-197
31 December 2005	27,780	925	1026	203	324	-221
31 December 2006	27,521	885	982	179	341	-259
31 December 2007	27,181	875	1107	232	341	-340
31 December 2008	26,958	961	1069	202	316	-223
31 December 2009	26,532	801	1078	198	348	-426
31 December 2010	26,344	853	899	212	355	-188

Census 2011
(new basis of calculation)

Date	Population	Moving in	Moving out	Births	Deaths	Change
9 May 2011	25,361	-	-	-	-	-
31 December 2011	25,162	852	1023	216	357	-312
31 December 2012	25,148	1116	962	183	349	-12
31 December 2013	25,005	954	992	204	317	-151
31 December 2014	24.911	1063	1005	192	348	−98
31 December 2015	24.850	1223	1122	195	366	−70

¹ Merging districts

Source: Statistisches Landesamt des Freistaates Sachsen

== Politics ==
=== Town council ===
The town council consists of the lord mayor and 30 town councillors. Every five years, the town council is chosen anew. The inaugural meeting of newly elected council always takes place in the conference hall of the city hall. The current council has been in place since the last local election (held on 26 May 2019), and is constituted as follows:

Party		% of vote 2019	Seats 2019	% of vote 2014 (Note: Percentages are rounded)	Seats 2014	% of vote 2009	Seats 2009
CDU	CDU	25,9 %	8	34,4 %	11	34,9 %	11
FWG	FWG	23,3 %	7	18,5 %	6	14,6 %	4
AfD	Alternative for Germany	16,0 %	5	–	–	–	–
SPD	SPD	14,3 %	4	20,5 %	6	20,5 %	7
LINKE	The Left	10,0 %	3	15,6 %	5	8,9 %	6
BI	Bürgerinitiative Menschenskinder e.V.	3,9 %	1	–	–	–	–
HV	Heimatverein Döbernitz e.V.	3,5 %	1	3,3 %	1	2,7 %	0
GRÜNE	Alliance 90/The Greens	3,1 %	1	2,4 %	0	–	–
NPD	NPD	–	–	4,4 %	1 (Note: The elected representative left the NPD in January 2015 and remained as an independent until the May 2019 election]])	3,8 %	1
FDP	FDP	–	–	1,0 %	0	4,6 %	1
Total		100%	30	100%	30	100%	30
% of Vote		53,7 %		42,4 %		39,5 %	

The next council elections are scheduled for 2024.

=== Mayor ===
- Arno Erhardt: 1945
- Richard Hampe: 1945–1950
- Paul Heinze: 1951–1952
- Walter Lange: 1952–1956
- Rudolf Kunath: 1956–1959
- Otto Paul: 1960–1973
- Hans-Joachim Kumrow: 1973–1977
- Wolfgang Neubert: 1977–1979
- Karl Lubienski: 1979–1990
- Heinz Bieniek: 1990–2008

Historian Manfred Wilde (born 1962) won the mayoral election in 2008 with 60.2 percent of the votes cast.

=== Coat of Arms ===
The emblem of the town Delitzsch combines two different arms, the house of Wettin or tribal emblem and the County of the Mark Meissen. It shows two upright poles blue (Landsberger piles) that are in a golden box, and this split in three parts. In the middle of the main shield of the emblem can be seen in an inclined position as a means to shield Meissen black lion on a golden shield. The middle blade is tilted forward, and so the lion appears as upright as possible, or borders. He has two tail tuft, with their division begins in the middle of the tail, which should point to the Mark Meissen County. As an accessory, the coat of arms (1526 introduced) a fluttering ribbon bearing the inscription: "Secretum civium in delitzsch" (loosely translated: Privy Seal of Delitzsch).

== Twin towns – sister cities ==
Delitzsch is twinned with:

- Friedrichshafen, Germany (1990)
- Monheim am Rhein, Germany (1990)
- Ostrów Wielkopolski, Poland (2000)

== Traffic ==
=== Road ===
To the west of the town the national roads B183a and B184 intersect.

=== Rail transport ===
Delitzsch has an "upper station" with two platforms and a "lower station" with three tracks. Both stations are in the tariff zone 165 of the regional public transport network (Mitteldeutscher Verkehrsverbund). Since December 2008 the two stations have been served Mitteldeutsche Regionalbahn ("Central German regional railway" (MRB)) in addition to Deutsche Bahn (DB), services to and from Delitzsch oberer Bahnhof have been taken over by Abellio in 2015. The upper station is served by regional trains hourly on weekdays, two-hourly on weekends. The lower station is served by S-Bahn Mitteldeutschland and by regional trains between Leipzig and Magdeburg. Long-distance services can be reached by changing in Leipzig or Halle.

- The trains of the MRB take the following route:
  - Eilenburg - Delitzsch oberer Bahnhof - Halle (Saale) Hauptbahnhof (MRB118)
- The DB trains run on the following lines:
  - Eilenburg - Delitzsch oberer Bahnhof - Halle (Saale) Hauptbahnhof (RB118)
  - Leipzig Hauptbahnhof - Delitzsch unterer Bahnhof - Bitterfeld - Dessau - Magdeburg (RE13)
  - Leipzig Hauptbahnhof - Delitzsch unterer Bahnhof - Bitterfeld - Dessau (RB54)
  - Leipzig Hauptbahnhof - Delitzsch unterer Bahnhof - Bitterfeld - Wittenberg (RB57)
- The trains of the S-Bahn Mitteldeutschland take the route:
  - Gaschwitz - Leipzig-Connewitz - Leipzig City Tunnel - Delitzsch unterer Bahnhof - Bitterfeld (S2)

=== Air traffic ===
Leipzig/Halle Airport is located 14 miles (23 km) southwest of Delitzsch.

== Economy ==
The most important industries in Delitzsch included the sugar and confectionery industry. Currently, the Delitzscher Chocolate Factory (acquired on 1 October 2008 by the Halloren Chocolate Factory AG), the EuroMaint Rail GmbH (former rail car plant SFW Delitzsch GmbH), URSA Insulation and the Smurfit Kappa Corrugated board plant are the major industrial employers. Most of these big companies are located in the industrial area on the south-west side.

Due to the EU production quotas for sugar, the sugar factory (Südzucker) was shut down in 2001.

Lignite mining was discontinued in the early 1990s, the remaining mines are planned to be a system of lakes and heathland in an arc from the southwest to the north.

== Sights ==
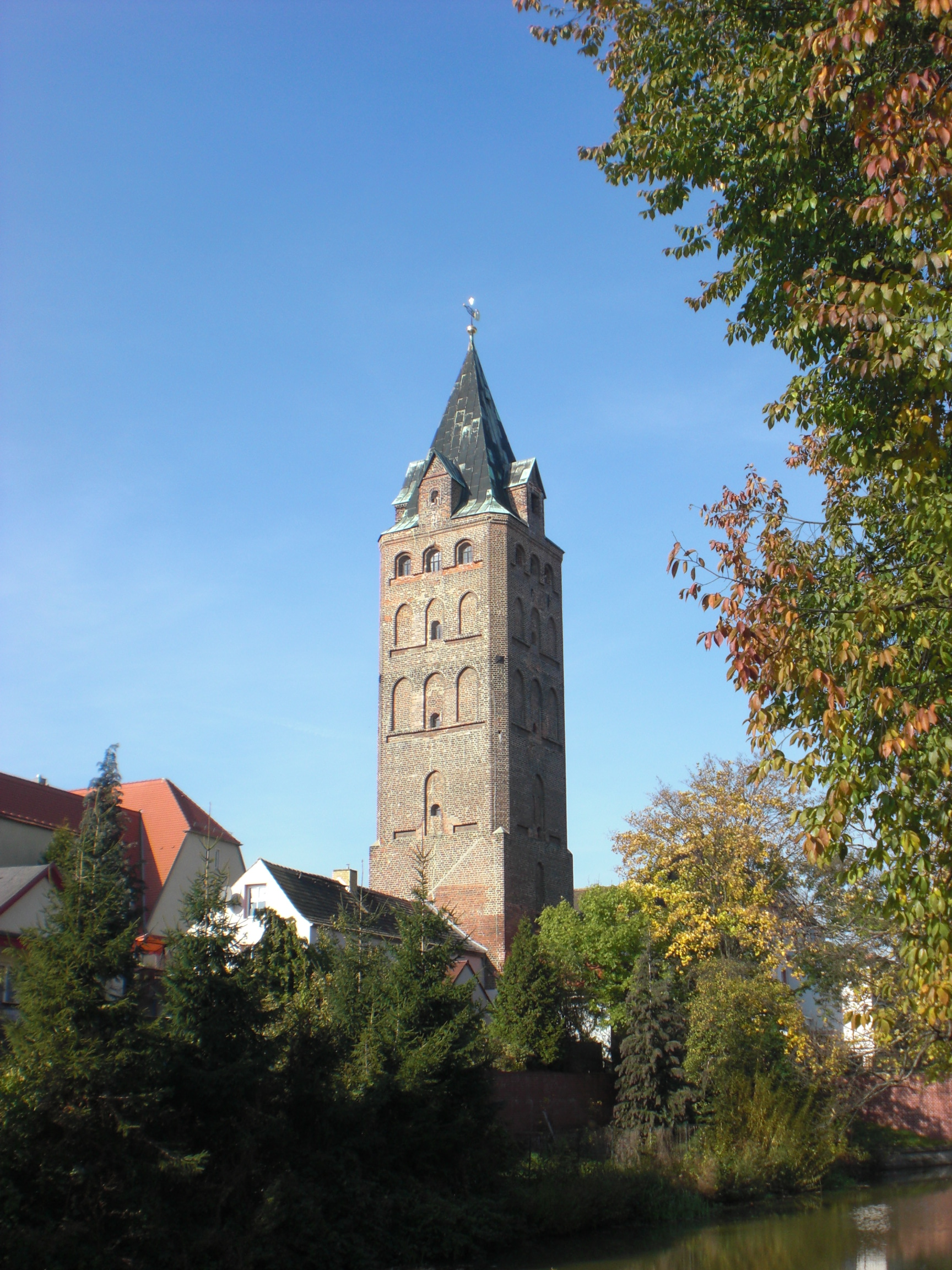
Breiter Turm in the Delitzscher old town

- Baroque castle with Lustgarten (pleasure gardens), formerly temporary residence and administrative centre, later dower of the Dukes of Saxe-Merseburg, built on the foundations of a medieval moated castle
- kennel gardens, terraced green space created between the city wall and moat (re-opened to visitors in 2010)
- fortifications dating back to the 14th and 15th century with two towers, defensive wall, and water-filled moat
- rose garden
- city church of St. Peter & Paul, brick church of the 15th century with significant high altar
- memorial to Hermann Schulze-Delitzsch
- executioner's house (resident executioner first documented in 1619)
- Stadtschreiberhaus, former home and workplace of the town clerk, now a gallery
- city park with water basin
- zoological gardens

== Sports ==
Among the many sports clubs in North Saxony district town, among other things, the annual sporting events like the LVZ Bicycle Ride, Delitzsch moves or the old town race. More than 13 sports clubs are based in the region of Delitzsch. Some of the clubs:

- 1. SV Concordia Delitzsch
- NHV Concordia Delitzsch 2010 e.V. (second handball club)
- GSVE Delitzsch 1995 e.V. (volleyball club)
- Delitzscher Sportfüchse 1995 e.V. (judo club)
- 1.FC Delitzsch 2010 e.V. (football club)
- RV Germania Delitzsch 1891 e.V. (bicycle club)
- Korean Tigers 1989 e.V. (Taekwondoverein)
- Delitzscher tennis club 1921 e.V.
- Badminton club Delitzsch
- Dive club Delitzsch 1958 e.v.

== Education ==
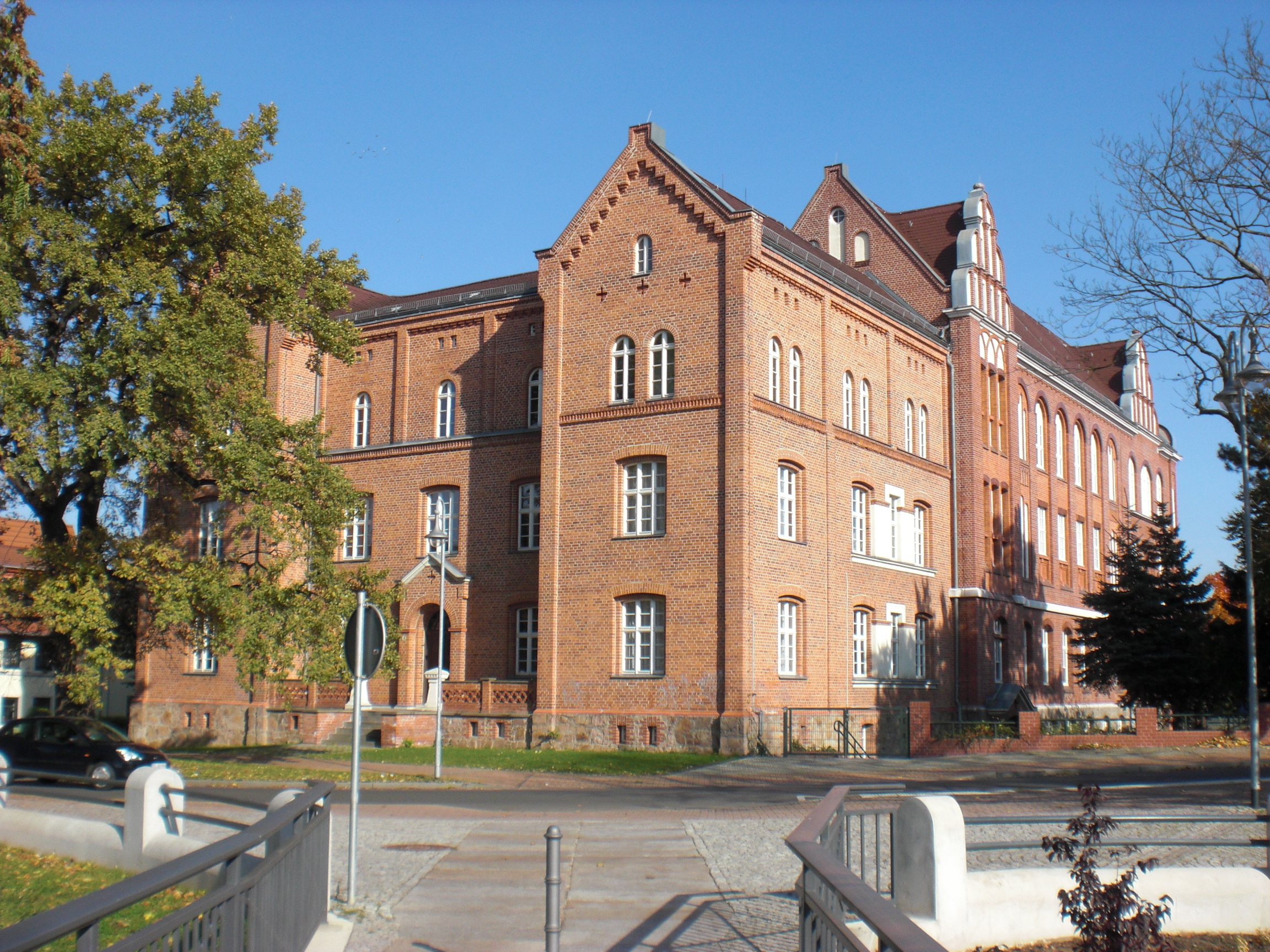
Christian-Gottfried-Ehrenberg-Grammar School

The first school was built around 1426 as a boys school and was expanded in the 16th century to cater for girls. Today more than 3,500 students learn in ten public and three private schools. These include three primary schools, two Mittelschulen (secondary schools), one grammar school, two colleges and two special schools. The School of Music, the Adult high school and the acting school are private schools.

- Primary schools
  - Primary school Diesterweg
  - Primary school on Rosenweg
  - Primary school Delitzsch-East
- Middle schools
  - Artur Becker- Middle School
  - Middle School Delitzsch-North
- Grammar school
  - Christian-Gottfried-Ehrenberg-Grammar School
- Technical and vocational schools
  - School of Social Sciences
  - Vocational School Dr. Hermann Schulze-Delitzsch
- Special schools
  - Special Educationscool Rödgen - school for mentally disabled
  - Pestalozzischool – school to promote learning
- Other schools
  - Delitzsch Music School
  - Theatre Academy Saxony (Acting School)
  - Adult high school

== Notable people ==
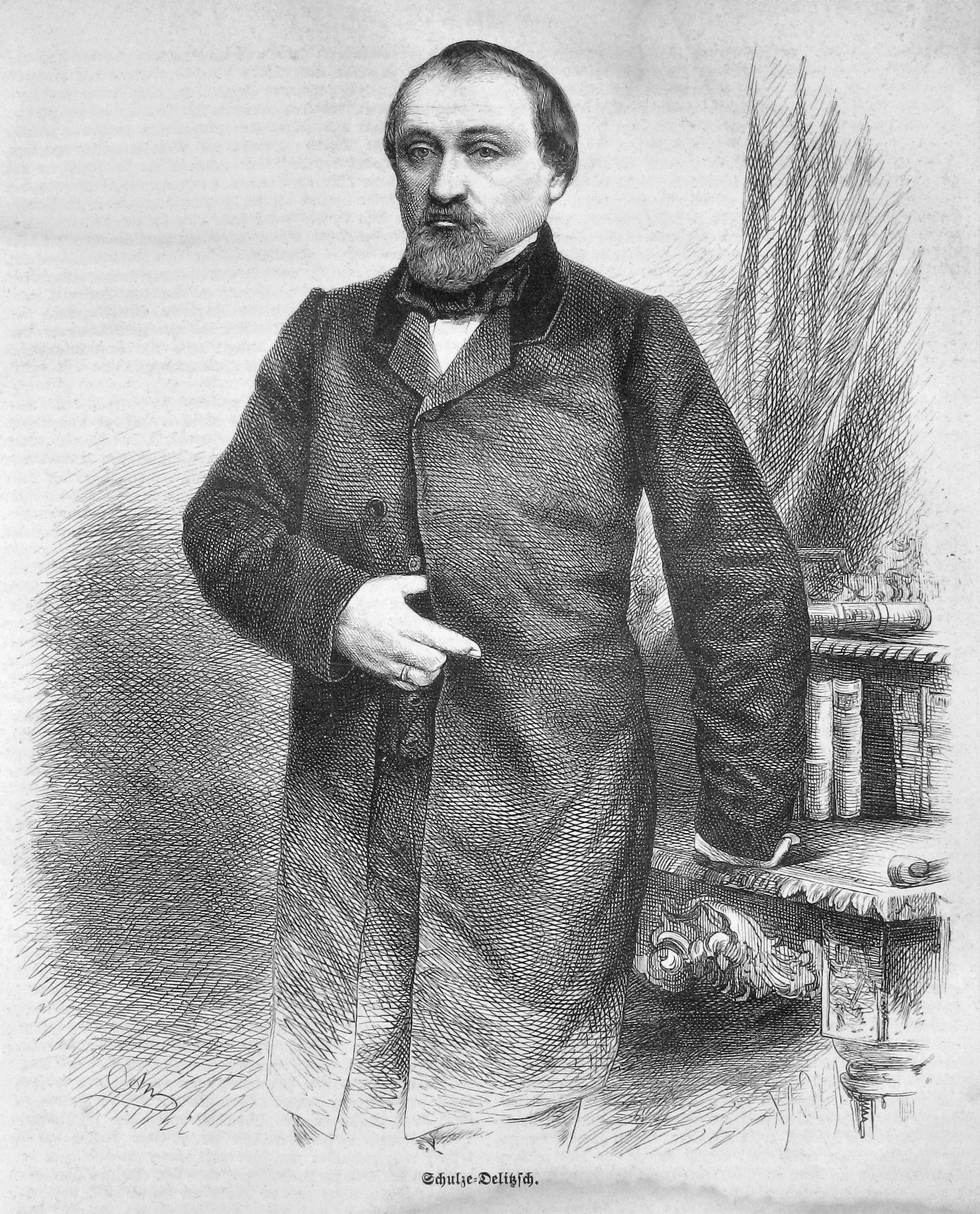
Hermann Schulze-Delitzsch, 1863

- Lucas Brandis (c. 1450–1500) and his brothers, Moritz, Mark, and Matthew Brandis (died after 1512), book printers
- Max Bruning (1887–1968), painter, born in the house market 20
- Norbert Denef (born 1949), campaigner about sexual abuse in the Roman Catholic church.
- Carl August Ehrenberg (1801–1849), botanist and plant collector.
- Christian Gottfried Ehrenberg (1795–1876), bioscientist, co-discovered the use of bacteria in medicine
- Bernhard Förster (1843–1889), high school teacher, cultural critic and husband of Elizabeth (Forester) Nietzsche
- Paul Fürbringer (1849–1930), physician
- Clementine Helm (1825–1896), children's and youth book author
- Eberhard Ruhmer (1917–1996), art historian and curator, son of the city minister Wilhelm Ruhmer
- Erasmus Schmidt (1570–1637), mathematician and philologist
- Helmut Schreyer (1912–1984), German telecommunications specialist, inventor and professor in Rio de Janeiro
- Franz Hermann Schulze-Delitzsch (1808–1883), founder of the German cooperative system and politician, born in the house market 11 (plaque).
- Walter Tiemann (1876–1951), book artist and graphic designer

=== Sport ===
- Joachim Fritsche (born 1951), footballer in the East German league, played for the GDR, 1973–1977
- Lutz Mack (born 1952), gymnast
- Siegfried Mehnert (born 1963), boxer
