= Dorothy Still Danner =

American Navy nurse and POW during WWII (1914–2001)

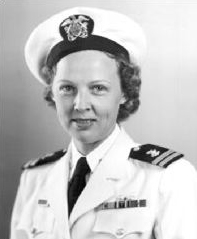
- Dorothy Still Danner, from a 1992 publication of the U.S. Department of the Navy.
- Born: Dorothy Still; November 29, 1914; Saginaw, Michigan, U.S.
- Died: June 16, 2001 (aged 86); Boise, Idaho, U.S.
- Other names: Dorothy Still Terrill (after second marriage)
- Occupations: Navy nurse in World War II, prisoner of war in the Philippines
- Notable work: What a Way to Spend a War (memoir, 1995)

Dorothy Still Danner (November 29, 1914 – June 16, 2001) was an American Navy nurse in World War II, and, as a prisoner of war held by the Japanese from 1942 to 1945, one of the Twelve Anchors.

== Early life ==
Dorothy Still was born in Saginaw, Michigan, the daughter of William H. Still and Arrissa Still. She was raised in Long Beach, California. She trained as a nurse at the Los Angeles County General Hospital in 1932.

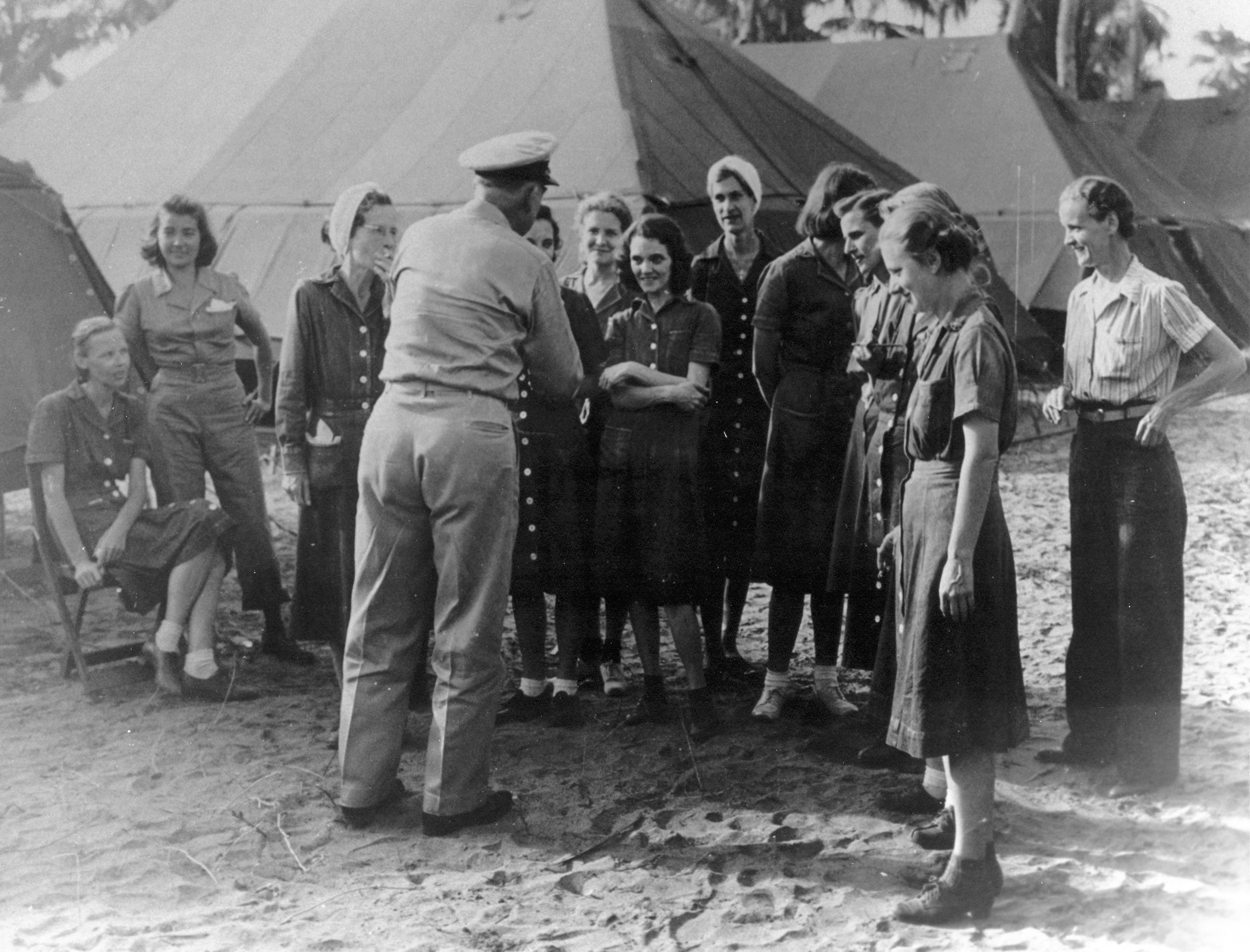
U.S. Navy Nurses rescued from Los Banos. General Kinkaid facing away from camera; Chief Nurse Laura Cobb to immediate left of Gen. Kinkaid with cigarette; Nurse Dorothy Still Danner seated at far left.

== Navy nurse in World War II ==
Dorothy Still worked at two hospitals before she joined the Navy in 1937. She was first assigned to Balboa Hospital in San Diego; in 1939, she was sent to Cañacao Naval Hospital in the Philippines.

Still was one of the American Navy nurses, later known as the "Twelve Anchors," who were taken prisoner by Japanese troops in January 1942 in Manila. The group was taken first to the University of Santo Tomas, and to the Los Baños prison camp in May 1943. There, despite a severe lack of supplies and malnutrition, they built an infirmary and cared for inmates until the camp was liberated in February 1945. On the night before liberation, the guards set up machine guns to prepare to execute all the inmates the following day. Despite this looming threat, Still and nurse Margaret Nash still showed up to the infirmary for their scheduled night shift. Still was on duty during liberation and helped with the evacuation. She was awarded a Gold Star, a Bronze Star, and a Prisoner of War Medal, among other decorations.

Soon after her return to the United States, Still promoted war bonds for the U.S. Treasury Department. She was transferred to Panama late in 1945. She retired from the Navy when she married in 1947. She experienced ongoing health issues for years after her imprisonment, but found little support; a Navy psychiatrist told her that nurses could not experience posttraumatic stress disorder like soldiers did. She worked as a nurse and a hospital supervisor in her civilian life. In retirement, she wrote a memoir of her wartime experiences, What a Way to Spend a War: Navy Nurse POWs in the Philippines (1995). In 2019, she was the subject of the book, This is Really War: The Incredible True Story of a Navy Nurse POW in the Occupied Philippines.

== Personal life ==
Dorothy Still married Goldburn Robert Danner in 1947. They had three children, the third born after Peck Danner's death in 1956, from a heart attack. She was known as Dorothy Still Terrill in the 1980s, after a second marriage. Still died on June 16, 2001, aged 86 years, at a veteran's home in Boise, Idaho. Her remains were buried, with full military honors, in Arlington National Cemetery. Her name, along with the names of the other Angels of Bataan nurses, is on a historical marker in Cavite City in the Philippines.
