= Julius Strauss =

British journalist (born 1967)

Julius Strauss (born in 1967) is a journalist, wilderness guide and bear behaviouralist. He writes a newsletter called Back to the Front and runs Wild Bear Lodge, a bear-viewing lodge in British Columbia.

== Early Journalism career ==
Strauss began his career as a British print journalist who spent many years working in Bosnia, Kosovo, Afghanistan, Iraq and other war zones. In 2002, he was posted to Moscow as the Daily Telegraph's bureau chief, from where he covered Putin's Russia and various Chechen crises. He also continued to report from Iraq.

In 2005, Strauss left the Telegraph and relocated to Canada, where he spent six months working for The Globe and Mail. In 2007, he was appointed to the Atwood Chair in the journalism department at the University of Alaska Anchorage.

== Canada, Wild Bear Lodge, grizzly bear protection, later journalism career and charity work ==
From early 2006, Strauss has run Wild Bear Lodge in British Columbia.

In 2011 Strauss served as a political officer working with the US Marines in southern Afghanistan for several months. In 2017 he returned to Russia, Ukraine and Georgia with Thomas Dworzak of Magnum Photos to retrace the 1947 steps of John Steinbeck and Robert Capa.

Between 2015 and 2017, Strauss spearheaded a political campaign to ban grizzly bear hunting in British Columbia as the Chairman of the Political Committee of the Commercial Bear Viewing Association, which culminated in a full ban announced by the BC government in Dec 2017. He has been featured on The Grizzly Truth, Trophy and Ben Fogle's New Lives in the Wild.

Strauss continues to run Wild Bear Lodge taking a small number of guests out each year to view wild grizzly bears and other megafauna in their natural habitat.

He writes his own newsletter backtothefront.substack.com which includes field dispatches, comment and analysis on Ukraine, Russia, Afghanistan, the Balkans and eastern Europe.

Strauss also runs a charity programme for wounded and sick military veterans.

== Personal life ==
Strauss has been married twice.
