= Kayden Coleman =

American transgender activist

Kayden Coleman (born July 5, 1986) is an American transgender advocate, educator, and social media influencer. He is known for raising awareness of trans men who experience pregnancy. In 2013, when Coleman was 4 years into gender reassignment therapy, he found out he was pregnant with his and his partner's first child. Since then, Coleman has been interviewed by news outlets such as USA Today, TODAY.com, and Out about his experiences with transgender pregnancy. In 2021, he was honored by Out as an Out100 honoree, a recognition given to prominent members of the LGBTQ+ community for their outstanding work promoting LGBTQ+ rights. He has appeared in a commercial for Lexus.

== Early life ==
Coleman was born on July 5, 1986. He is of Jamaican and African descent. As a child who was assigned female at birth, Coleman experienced feelings of gender dysphoria, which led to his later gender transition.

== Health and transition ==
After the birth of his first daughter, Coleman reported he experienced postpartum depression, PTSD, anxiety, and other after-effects of childbirth, which led him to seek out doulas who helped him alleviate his symptoms.

Coleman first began testosterone hormone therapy in January 2009. He underwent breast reduction surgery, better known today as top surgery, in March 2013. To do so, he paused hormone treatment and as a result became pregnant in early 2013. He did not become aware of his pregnancy for five and a half months. In February 2020, Coleman announced his second pregnancy. He gave birth to his second daughter later that summer.

Coleman refuses to undergo genital reconstructive surgery, known more colloquially as bottom surgery, citing issues in regard to cost, health complications, and sexual pleasure.

In November 2021, Coleman was diagnosed with renal cell carcinoma.

== Career and activism ==
Coleman is an advocate for LGBTQ+ rights and inclusion, with specific focus on fertility and pregnancy issues that affect Black, gay, and transmasculine individuals. He calls himself "Papa Seahorse," as male seahorses are known for carrying fertilized eggs. He has been vocal about the racism and transphobia that he has faced in the American medical system, sharing that a few of his medical providers have suggested that he undergo an abortion. He has spoken about being misgendered by medical professionals, as well as his difficulty in accessing classes for birthing, chest feeding, and postpartum support groups, because they were labeled as women's spaces and thus were inaccessible to men.

He and his partner, Dominique Glinton, have appeared in a commercial for Lexus, titled "The Evolution of Family," in which they share their experiences of fatherhood.

== Personal life ==
Coleman married his first husband, Elijah, in 2013. Coleman gave birth to their daughter, Azaelia Skye, in early 2014. In January 2020, Coleman announced his second pregnancy with his partner, Dominique. Their daughter, Jurnee, was born later that year.
