= Lynda Cash =

Royal Navy officer

Lynda Cash (born in 1949 or 1950 (age 75–76) ) was the first transsexual person known to have served in the Royal Navy. She served in the Falklands War while identifying as a man and was rejected from Royal Navy service.

She was originally from Bolton, Lancashire and worked as an operating theatre technician. Cash joined the Royal Navy in 1971. She married and had one child. During the Falklands War, in 1982, she served on HMS Invincible treating seriously injured servicemen.

In 1986, Cash started transitioning and was discharged from the Navy. She had sexual reassignment surgery in 1988. Cash then worked for North Manchester Healthcare NHS Trust. She met her boyfriend on a trip to Chester but waited five years before telling him about her transsexual background. He chose to stay with her.

Cash has war flashbacks and posttraumatic stress disorder. In 1999, she appealed to a tribunal claiming unfair dismissal and medical negligence. This claim was dismissed. She then appealed on grounds of sex discrimination, but was dismissed on the grounds that the time limit had expired in 1995. She then applied for a sickness pension in that it was post-traumatic stress rather than her gender change that had made her unsuitable to stay in the Navy. A letter from the Naval Personnel Secretariat said: "Because his [sic] post-traumatic stress disorder remained undiagnosed or acknowledged, his [sic] gender dysphoria and its apparent effects became the primary reason for dealing with his [sic] case administratively". She was awarded £68,000 in back pension payments.
