= Benedict Joseph Murdoch =

Benedict Joseph Murdoch (1886–1973), better known as Reverend B.J. Murdoch, was a Roman Catholic priest and writer. His best known work is The Red Vineyard (1923), which recalls his service during the First World War as a military chaplain. He initially enlisted and trained with the 132nd CEF Battalion (North Shore), and eventually served in England, France, Belgium and Germany. The unit was used as reinforcements upon its arrival in the United Kingdom.

Later in his life he suffered from posttraumatic stress disorder (PTSD) or shell shock as it was called at the time. This resulted in him living almost half his life in seclusion in Bartibog, New Brunswick.

In addition to The Red Vineyard in 1923, he also authored:

- Souvenir, 1926.
- Sprigs, 1927.
- Alone with Thee: Readings for the Holy Hour, 1934.
- Part Way Through, 1946.
- Facing into the Wind, 1952.
- The Menders, 1953.
- Fear Ye Not, 1961.
- The Murphy's Come In, 1965.
- Swing High, 1965.
