= Zoe Helene =

American artist and activist

- Born: July 18, 1964 (age 62); Charlotte, North Carolina, U.S.
- Occupations: Feminist, Cultural Activist, Artist, Environmentalist
- Spouse: Chris Kilham (2007-present)
- Website: www.zoehelene.com

Zoe Helene (born July 18, 1964) is a cultural activist who founded Cosmic Sister, an environmental feminist collective, and coined the phrase “psychedelic feminism.”

== Early life and early career ==
Helene grew up in New Zealand, where she moved in 1974. Both parents fought for a Nuclear Free Pacific. Her mother, Ewanna Castanas, is a retired artist, gallery curator, and restaurant entrepreneur of Greek descent from Karyes (Arachova). Her father, William Sprott Greene, Jr. is a retired artist of Jewish and Scottish descent. He was founding faculty of the University of North Carolina School of the Arts and taught gifted performing artists and advocated for the sciences and arts as allies. Helene left New Zealand at age 19 to attend college in the United States, earning a Master of Fine Arts in Theatre at Brandeis University under mentor Patricia Zipprodt.

During the 1990s, she was a high tech creative executive in Cambridge, Massachusetts, where she helped combine the arts and artificial intelligence and led a creative team of artists and engineers in developing early interactive media campaigns for Fortune 500 clients. She also worked in the performing arts, and trained as a Disney animator.

== Activism ==
Helene is an advocate for the use of naturally occurring psychoactives and psychedelics, the "sacred plants," and "psychedelic feminism," a sub-genre of Eco-feminism she developed to help popularize intentional work with psychedelics for women’s "healing, empowerment, and self-liberation." Many of her advocacy efforts are for education about gender equity in the psychedelic field and industry, and the benefits and risks of ayahuasca, psilocybin mushrooms and cannabis as well as their legalization.

In 2007, Helene founded the environmental feminist collective Cosmic Sister to provide women in the natural products industry with feminist support. Cosmic Sister also promotes the responsible use of psychoactive and psychedelic plants and fungi with a focus on women’s rights and issues, and works toward gender parity in the field and industry of psychedelics through a series of interconnected educational advocacy projects.

She is also a wildlife advocate who has published about animal rights and critically endangered species such as Mexican gray wolves and New Zealand's Maui's dolphin.

== Medicine Hunter ==
At age 40, Helene left her tech career. In 2007, she married ethnobotanist Chris Kilham. She has traveled the world with him for over a decade as part of the Medicine Hunter team, promoting sustainable medicinal plant trade, cultural preservation, and environmental sustainability.

She is a spiritual agnostic.
