= Georg-Andreas Pogany =

Georg-Andreas "Andrew" Pogany (born in 1971 in Munich, Germany) is a former United States Army Staff Sergeant and a posttraumatic stress disorder diagnosis advocate. In April 2005 Pogany was honorably discharged for medical reasons related to PTSD. However, less than two years earlier, on October 14, 2003, Pogany's separation status and reputation was in serious jeopardy as he became the first American soldier since the Vietnam War to be charged with cowardice.

During Pogany's service, he was an interrogator for the Green Berets. On only his second night in Iraq Pogany witnessed the gruesome death of an Iraqi who was cut in half by machine gun fire. He told his superiors that he was suffering from panic attacks and was headed towards a nervous breakdown. Soon after his request his superiors sent him to Fort Carson, Colorado, to face a court-martial for cowardice, a charge which may be punishable by death. The charge was later reduced to dereliction of duty, and was ultimately dropped on Dec 18, 2003. The Army offered Pogany a non-judicial punishment proceeding, but he instead requested a court-martial.

Army psychologists said that Pogany had no psychological disorders, but had symptoms consistent with PTSD. Pogany claims that his panic attacks may have been related to Lariam, an antimalarial drug that he and other Ft. Carson soldiers took on a weekly basis prior to leaving for Iraq. The drug's manufacturer, Roche, has received over 3,000 reports of side effects, including paranoia, psychosis and aggression. The Army dropped all charges against Pogany, and a spokesman stated that Pogany “may have a medical problem that requires care and treatment.”

After Pogany retired from the military, he has worked as a veterans' and active duty service advocate for issues related to health and military justice. He founded and currently manages "J1W2", or "Just One Wounded Warrior" which seeks to connect veteran and active military to mental health care professionals.
