= Janina Scarlet =

Ukrainian-born American clinical psychologist (born 1983)

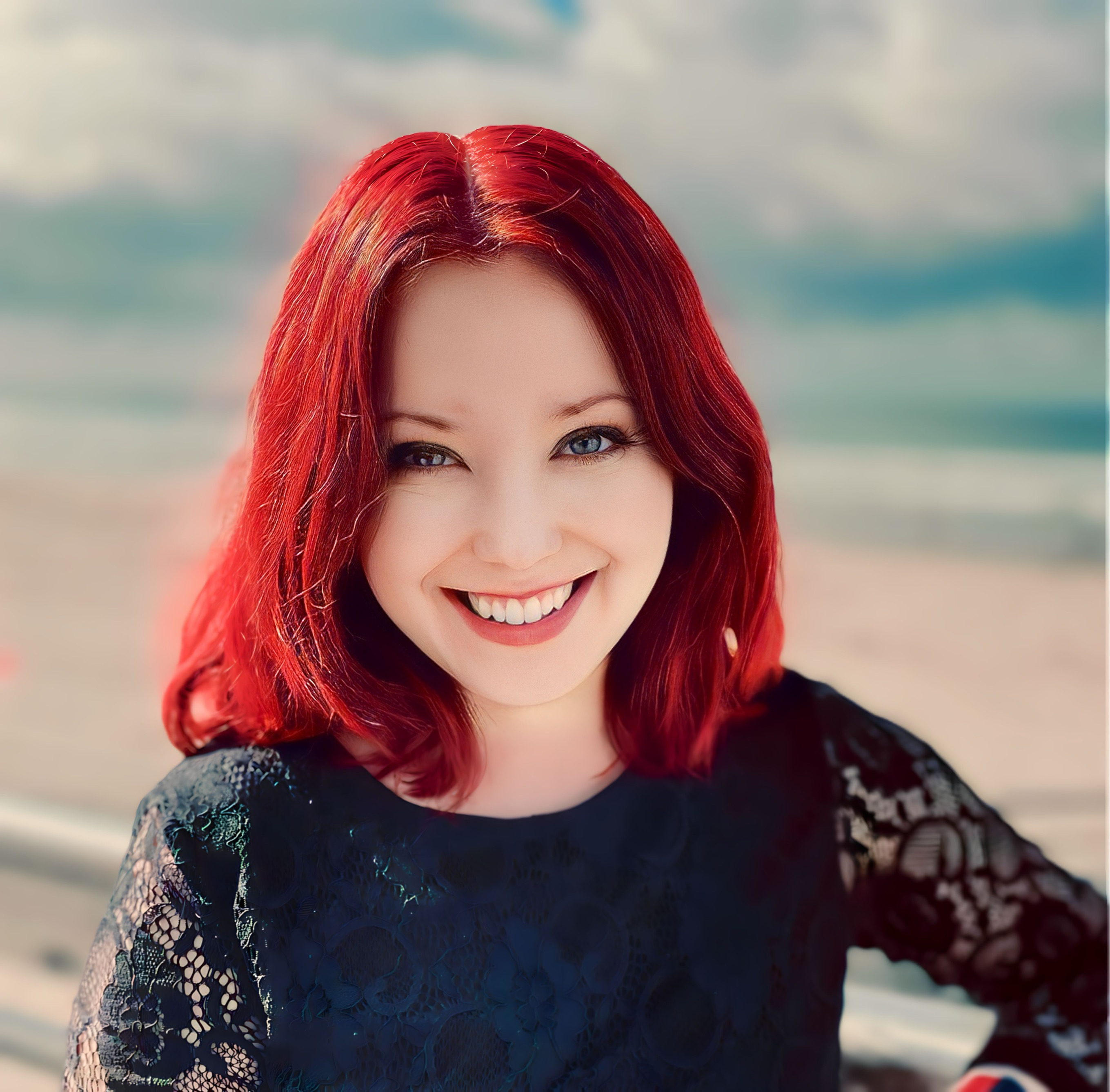
- Born: October 12, 1983 (age 43); Ukraine
- Known for: Superhero therapy
- Medical career
- Field: Author; Clinical psychology Psychotherapy
- Awards: Eleanor Roosevelt Award for Human Rights

Janina Scarlet is a Ukrainian-born American author and clinical psychologist. She is known for using popular culture references in treating patients.

== Early and personal life ==
Scarlet was born and raised in Ukraine to a Jewish family. Scarlet and her family endured the Chernobyl disaster. As a child, she underwent severe radiation poisoning due to the Chernobyl nuclear disaster, which lead to her experiencing severe migraines and seizures. Her family then immigrated to the US in secret to get away from persecution and anti-semitism they were facing. After a year-long series of examinations, on September 15, 1995, they landed in America.

Scarlet was 12 years old when she arrived to the United States. She did not speak English at first and struggled with PTSD. She was also bullied for her origins; for instance, she was taunted as radioactive. A few years later, after watching X-Men, she resonated with its character Storm. She was inspired by Storm's similar origins that rather strengthened her as an individual, and it prompted her to reframe her story—from a victim to a survivor. She decided to study psychology to be able to help others who struggled with their past too.

== Education and career ==
Scarlet obtained a master's degree in psychology from Brooklyn College. In 2010, she acquired a doctorate in behavioral neuroscience from Graduate Center, CUNY. She earned a clinical psychology respecialization from Alliant International University and completed her post-doctorate training at Veterans Medical Research Center.

She treated active duty Marines with PTSD via her work at the Veterans Medical Research Center. There, she noticed that many service members identified themselves with superheroes—many stated that they wanted to be Superman but believed that they failed because they developed PTSD. Scarlet once queried a patient whether Superman has vulnerabilities, and he responded Kryptonite; she then inquired whether Kryptonite made Superman any less of a hero, and there was a change of his perspective. This made her comprehend the allegory of incorporating superheroes in treating psychological issues and disorders.

Scarlet worked as a research faculty at Alliant International University from 2011 to 2017 and as a psychologist at Sharp Memorial Center from 2013 to 2017. She began working as clinical psychologist at the Center for Stress and Anxiety Management in California in 2012 and worked there until 2022. Scarlet opened her own clinic, Trauma and PTSD Healing Center in 2022 and still works there now. She specializes in treating anxiety, stress, trauma, and PTSD. Scarlet has also conducted and published psychological analysis of popular films, TV shows, and books.

Scarlet is the recipient of the Eleanor Roosevelt Award for Human Rights by the San Diego chapter of the United Nations Association of the United States of America for her work in mental health education.

Scarlet has been featured as a character in the comic book Seven Days by Gail Simone.

Scarlet worked as a mental health consultant on the fourth season of the HBO Max animated show Young Justice, and was interviewed for Marvel's MPower.

== Superhero therapy ==
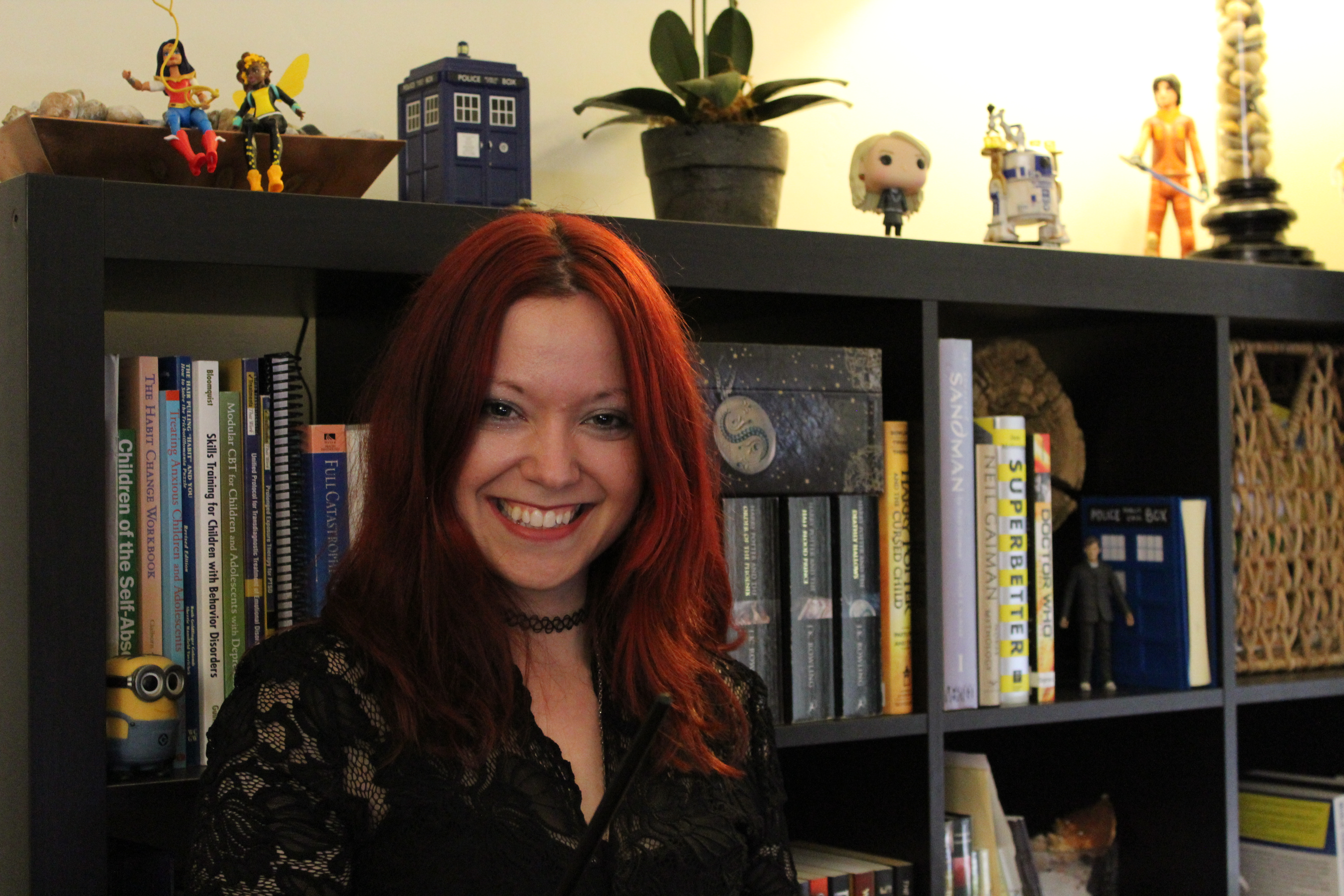
Janina Scarlet

Scarlet developed superhero therapy; it is a clinical method of using heroes or popular culture figures and incorporating them into evidence-based therapies to reshape narratives, build rapport, and manage an array of psychological issues. It is reinforced by parasocial interaction which is the connection between a fan and their role model. Scarlet noted a common tendency for patients to not open up – and she used stories, whether through films, novels etc. — to encourage free expression thereby gaining insight about the patient's case. Superhero therapy invites clients to consider their own origin stories, as well as to bring up fictional characters as heroic role models to facilitate treatment, as well as to help the clients to become their own version of a superhero in real life. It combines elements of cognitive behavioral therapy, narrative therapy, and acceptance and commitment therapy. While it is frequently used for treating younger patients, it is as applicable to adults as Superhero Therapy may use personal and nonfictional characters as well.

== Works ==
- The Walking Dead Psychology: Psych of the Living Dead (2015)
- Star Wars Psychology: Dark Side of the Mind (2015)
- Game of Thrones Psychology: The Mind is Dark and Full of Terrors (2016)
- Doctor Who Psychology: A Madman with a Box (2016)
- Captain America vs Iron Man Psychology (2016)
- Supernatural Psychology: Roads Less Traveled (2017)
- Wonder Woman Psychology: Lassoing the Truth (2017)
- Superhero Therapy: Mindfulness Skills to Help Teens and Young Adults Deal with Anxiety, Depression, and Trauma (2017)
- Harry Potter Therapy: An Unauthorized Self-Help Book from the Restricted Section (2017)
- Star Trek Psychology: The Mental Frontier (2017)
- Therapy Quest: An Interactive Journey Through Acceptance And Commitment Therapy (2018)
- Westworld Psychology (2018)
- Daredevil Psychology (2018)
- Black Panther Psychology (2019)
- Using Superheroes and Villains in Counseling and Play Therapy (2019)
- Super-Kids (2019)
- Violet and the Trial of Trauma (Dark Agents #1) (2020)
- Supernatural Therapy (2020)
- Super-Women (2020)
- Super Survivors (2021)
- It Shouldn't Be This Way: Learning to Accept the Things You Just Can't Change (2021)
- Superhero Therapy for Anxiety and Trauma (2021)
- Spider-Man Psychology (2023)
- Stranger Things Psychology (2023)
- Unseen, Unheard, Undervalued: Managing Loneliness, Loss of Connection and Not Fitting In (2023)
- Hunger Action Heroes Unite (2024)
- Through Bullets and Thunderstorms: A Holocaust Survival Pact (2025)
- The Villains Club: A Delightfully Devious Anthology (2026)
