= Norbert Denef =

German sexual abuse victim

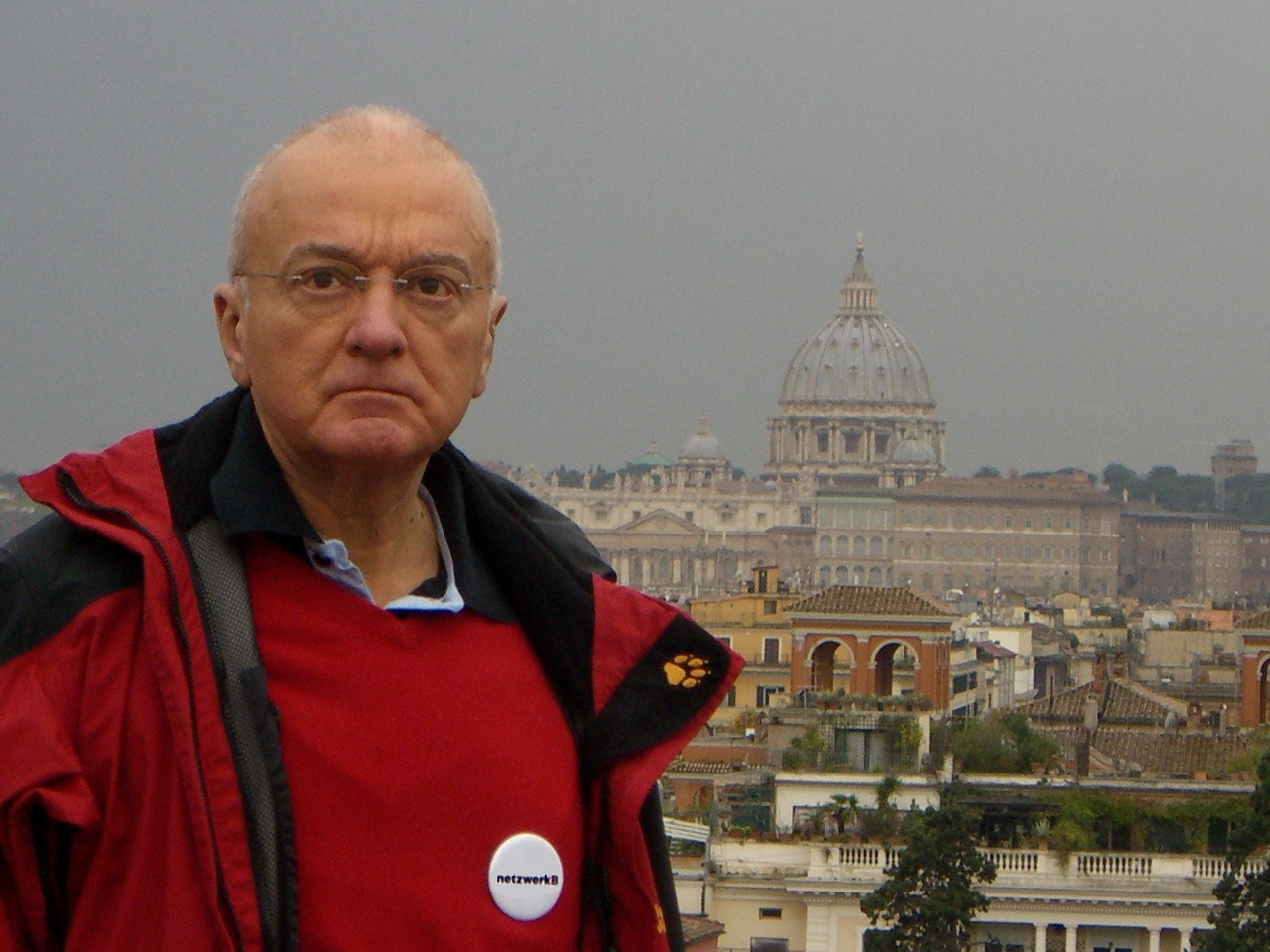
Norbert Denef, Vatican City, 2010

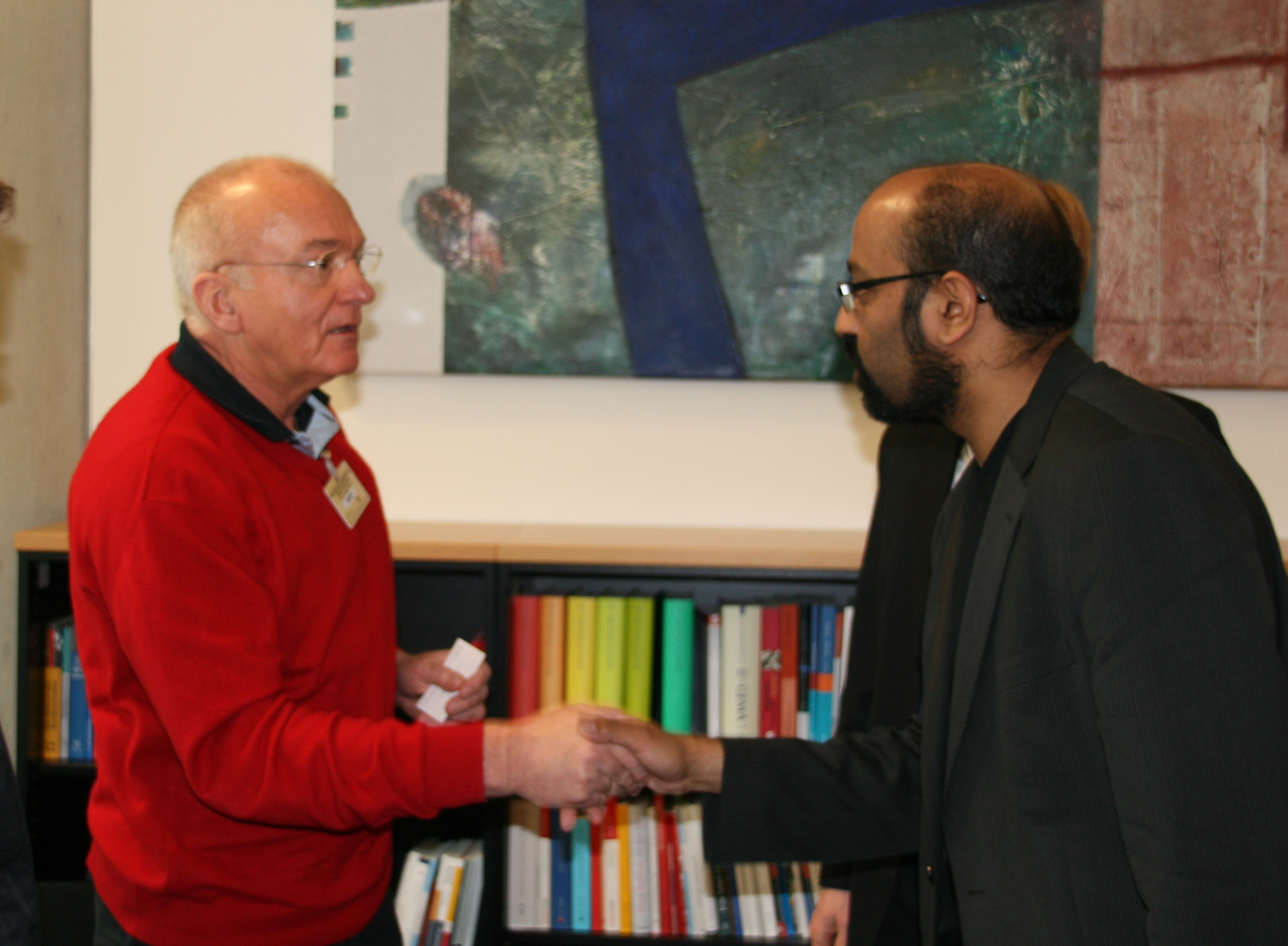
Norbert Denef speaking with Josef Philip Winkler and Siegmund Ehrmann in the German Bundestag, 2010

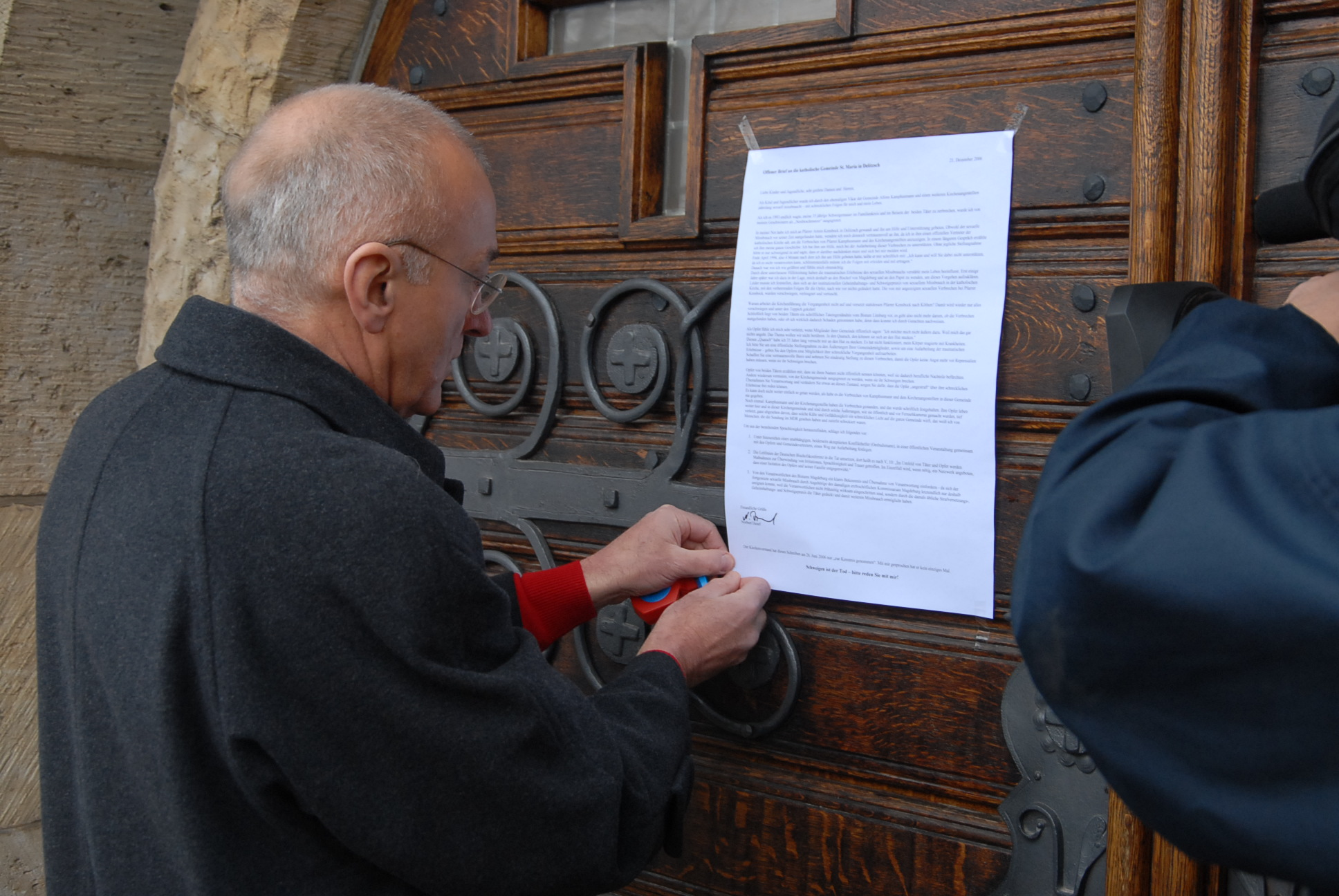
Norbert Denef, at the church of Delitzsch, 2009

Norbert Denef (born 5 May 1949 in Delitzsch, Germany) is a German victim of sexual abuse in the Roman Catholic church.

== Life ==
Denef was abused in his hometown Delitzsch between the ages of 10 and 16 by a priest, and from 16 to 18 by the parish's organist. The first offender, Alfons Kamphusmann (1924–1998), had been a priest since 1952. He worked in Droyßig, Delitzsch, Nordhausen, Langenweddingen, Hecklingen, Wittenberg Piesteritz and Niedertiefenbach (Diocese of Limburg). He retired in 1990 and died eight years later. The second offender, an organist and choir leader of the parish, retired and was never sued.

Denef lived on quietly, became the technical manager of the theater in Rüsselsheim, a husband and father of two children. He suppressed the memory of his past. The first offender officiated at his wedding. At the age of 40, Denef had a breakdown. After that he had to learn to speak about its history, beginning in November 1993 with his family of origin. He was offered compensation from the Diocese of Magdeburg in 2003, but refused the obligation to keep secrecy. In 2005 he received 25,000 Euro. Denef is believed to be the first victim in Germany who obtained compensation from the Roman Catholic church for sexual abuse in childhood.

In 2007 Denef published an autobiography: “Ich wurde sexuell missbraucht”. He still suffers from the impacts of the crime in his childhood and youth such as depression and posttraumatic stress disorder. Denef submitted a petition at the German Bundestag in 2008 to remove the statute of time limitations on child sexual abuse cases to file a lawsuit. It was refused. Denef is appealing the European Court of Human Rights now. In December 2009 Denef visited the parish church St. Marien in Delitzsch, but did not achieve a dialog. He left an open letter at the door of the church.

Denef founded the Network of Victims of Sexual Violence, named NetzwerkB for short, in April 2010 and became its speaker. During the Ecumenical Church Conference in Germany in May 2011, Denef interrupted the abuse debate in front of some thousand visitors. He criticed the podium's members for talking about victims, but not with them. Bishop Stephan Ackermann, chairman of the German bishop conference, said: “I am frightened about the development of the event. The man is right: We speak about institution. I have the feeling that the victims got out of the focus.”

As a speaker for NetzwerkB Denef protested against the nonparticipation of victims at a series of conferences on sexual child abuse organized by the Cabinet of Germany in Berlin in autumn 2010. He complained that there was too much talk and too little was done. In December 2010, members of Survivors Network of those Abused by Priests (SNAP), including Denef, demonstrated at a meeting of cardinals in the Vatican against the too-careful treatment of clergyman who abused children. The police ejected them from Saint Peter's Square.

In 2012 NetzwerkB demonstrated on the Pariser Platz concerning the Pope's visit of Germany.

On 6 December 2011 Denef spoke at the SPD congress. The party voted concordantly for abolishing the statutes of legal limitations for child abuse.

On 8 June 2012 Norbert Denef started a hunger strike, as the SPD was not willing to act to abolish the statutes of legal limitations for child abuse.

== denefhoop ==
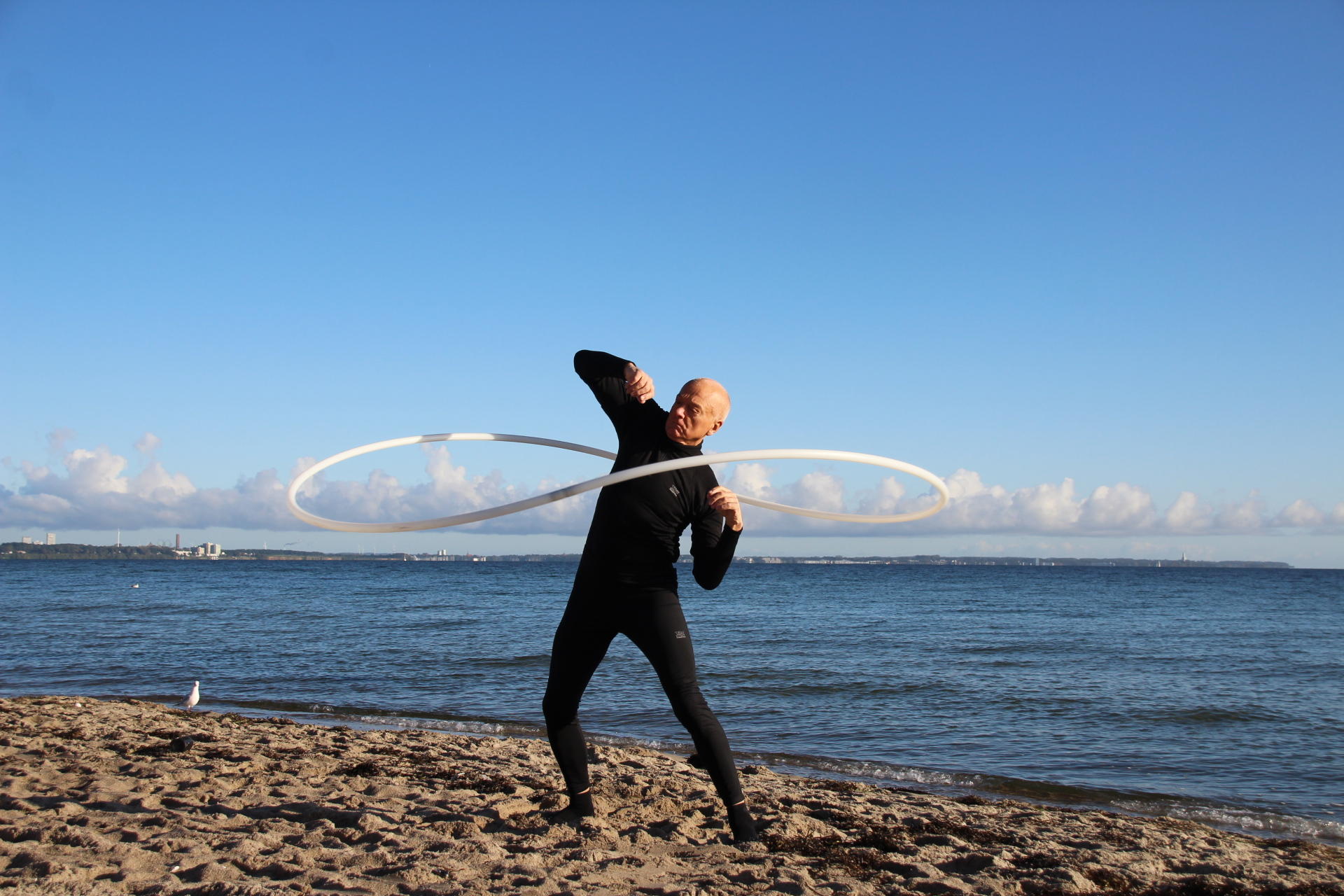
Denef performing his denefhoop on Scharbeutz beach, 2017

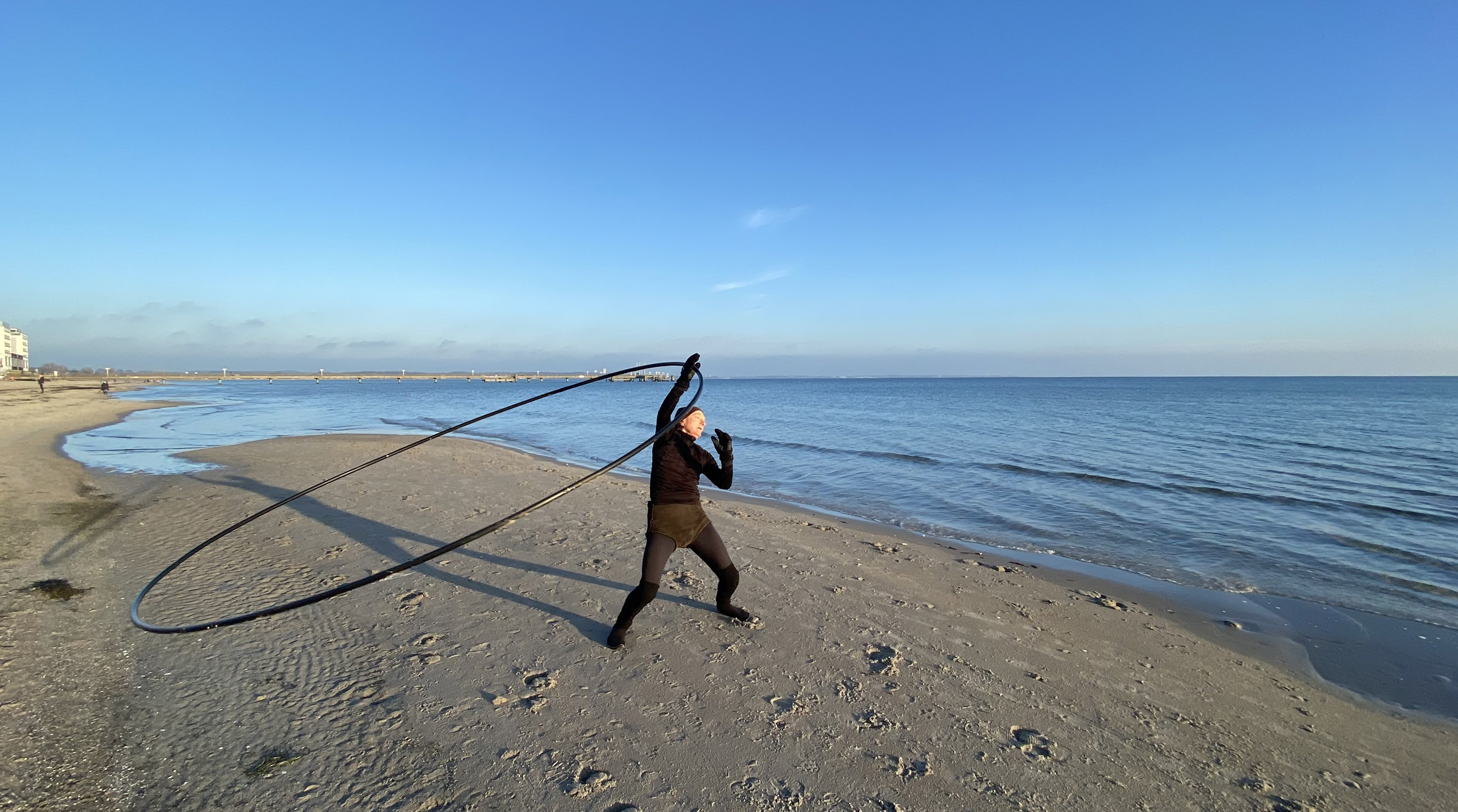
Denef, December 2020

In 2016 Denef developed tires from Leonardo da Vinci's Vitruvian Man in different diameters; the movements with the tires named denefhoop serve the meditation as well as the rhythmic gymnastics.

== Works ==
- Ich wurde sexuell missbraucht. Starks-Sture, München 2007, ISBN 978-3-939586-03-6.
- Beschwerde gemäß Artikel 34 der Europäischen Menschenrechtskonvention und Artikel 45 und 47 der Verfahrensordnung des Europäischen Gerichtshofs für Menschenrechte gegen die Bundesrepublik Deutschland, 24. Februar 2009. (online, pdf file; 267 kB)
