= Dahle =

Dahle may refer to:

- Dahle (river), a river of Saxony, Germany
- Dahle, Altena, a district of the town Altena in North Rhine-Westphalia, Germany
- Dahl (surname), (including a list of persons with the surnames Dahle and Dahl)
