= List of rivers of Saxony =

A list of rivers of Saxony, Germany:

== A ==
- Alte Luppe

== B ==
- Bahra
- Bahre
- Batschke
- Bauerngraben
- Biela
- Black Elster
- Black Pockau
- Bobritzsch
- Borlasbach
- Brunndöbra
- Burgauenbach

== C ==
- Chemnitz
- Colmnitzbach
- Cunnersdorfer Wasser

== D ==
- Dahle
- Döllnitz

== E ==
- Eastern Rietzschke
- Elbe
- Eula

== F ==
- Fällbach
- Feilebach
- Fleißenbach
- Flöha
- Freiberger Mulde
- Friesenbach

== G ==
- Geberbach
- Gimmlitz
- Goldbach
- Göltzsch
- Gösel
- Gottleuba
- Greifenbach
- Große Bockau
- Große Lößnitz
- Große Mittweida
- Große Pyra
- Große Röder
- Großschweidnitzer Wasser
- Gruna
- Grundwasser

== H ==
- Hammerbach
- Haselbach
- Helfenberger Bach
- Hoyerswerdaer Schwarzwasser

== J ==
- Jahna
- Jahnabach
- Jauer

== K ==
- Kabelske
- Käbnitz
- Kaitzbach
- Kaltenbach
- Kemmlitzbach
- Keppbach
- Ketzerbach
- Kirnitzsch
- Kleine Bockau
- Kleine Luppe
- Kleine Pleiße
- Kleine Pyra
- Kleine Röder, tributary of the Black Elster
- Kleine Röder, tributary of the Große Röder
- Kleine Spree
- Kleine Triebisch
- Kleinwaltersdorfer Bach
- Klosterwasser
- Kotitzer Wasser
- Krebsgraben
- Krippenbach

== L ==
- Lachsbach
- Landgraben
- Landwasser
- Langes Wasser
- Lausenbach
- Lausur
- Legnitzka
- Leinegraben
- Leubnitzbach
- Litte
- Löbauer Wasser
- Lober
- Lockwitzbach
- Lossa
- Lößnitzbach
- Lungwitzbach
- Luppe
- Lusatian Neisse

== M ==
- Maltengraben
- Mandau
- Müglitz
- Mühlgrundbach
- Mulde
- Münzbach

== N ==
- Nahle
- Natzschung
- Neue Luppe
- Northern Rietzschke

== O ==
- Oberhermsdorfer Bach
- Oelsabach
- Orla
- Otterbach

== P ==
- Parthe
- Paußnitz
- Pietzschebach
- Pleiße
- Pließnitz
- Pöbelbach
- Pöhlbach
- Pöhlwasser
- Polenz
- Pösgraben
- Preßnitz
- Prießnitz
- Pulsnitz

== Q ==
- Quänebach

== R ==
- Räderschnitza
- Raklitza
- Red Mulde
- Red Pockau
- Red Weißeritz
- Romereifeldgraben
- Rosenbach
- Roter Graben
- Rotes Wasser
- Ruhlander Schwarzwasser

== S ==
- Satkula
- Schaukelgraben
- Schirmbach
- Schlettenbach
- Schlumper
- Schnauder
- Schwarzbach, tributary of the Große Mittweida
- Schwarzbach, tributary of the Mulde
- Schwarzbach, tributary of the Sebnitz
- Schwarzbach, tributary of the White Elster
- Schwarze Röder
- Schwarzer Bach
- Schwarzer Graben
- Schwarzer Schöps
- Schwarzwasser, tributary of the Mulde
- Schwarzwasser, tributary of the Preßnitz
- Schweinitz
- Schwennigke
- Sebnitz
- Sehma
- Seidewitz
- Seifenbach
- Seltenrein
- Spitzkunnersdorfer Bach
- Spree
- Steindöbra
- Striegis
- Struga
- Svatava
- Svitavka
- Syrabach

== T ==
- Treba
- Trebnitz
- Treuener Wasser
- Trieb
- Triebisch

== V ==
- Verlorenes Wasser

== W ==
- Weinske
- Weißer Schöps
- Weißeritz
- Wesenitz
- White Elster
- White Mulde
- Wiederitz
- Wild Weißeritz
- Wilisch
- Wilzsch
- Wisenta
- Wittgendorfer Wasser
- Würschnitz
- Wyhra

== Z ==
- Zschampert
- Zschonerbach
- Zschopau
- Zwickauer Mulde
- Zwönitz
