= Leinegraben =

Leinegraben may refer to:

- Leinegraben (Leipzig), a river of Saxony, Germany, tributary of the Pleiße near Leipzig
- Leinegraben (lowland), a lowland in Lower Saxony and Hesse, Germany
- Leine Graben, trough of the river Leine, of Thuringia and Lower Saxony, Germany
