= Lossnitz =

Lossnitz, Loßnitz or Lößnitz can refer to several places in Germany:

- Niederlößnitz and Oberlößnitz, two parts of Radebeul
- Loßnitz, part of Freiberg, Saxony
- Lößnitz, a town in the district Aue-Schwarzenberg
- Große Lößnitz, a river in Saxony
- Lößnitz (Nebel), a river of Mecklenburg-Vorpommern

== See also ==
- Lößnitz tramway, interurban tramway in Saxony
- Lößnitzbach, a river in Saxony
