= Gruna =

Gruna or Grüna may refer to:

- Gruna, Czech Republic, a municipality and village in the Pardubice Region
- Gruna (Wesenitz), a river in Saxony, Germany
- Grüna, a hamlet of Kraftsdorf, a municipality in Thuringia, Germany
- Grüna, a constituent community of Lößnitz, a town in Saxony, Germany
