= Leubnitzbach =

River in Germany

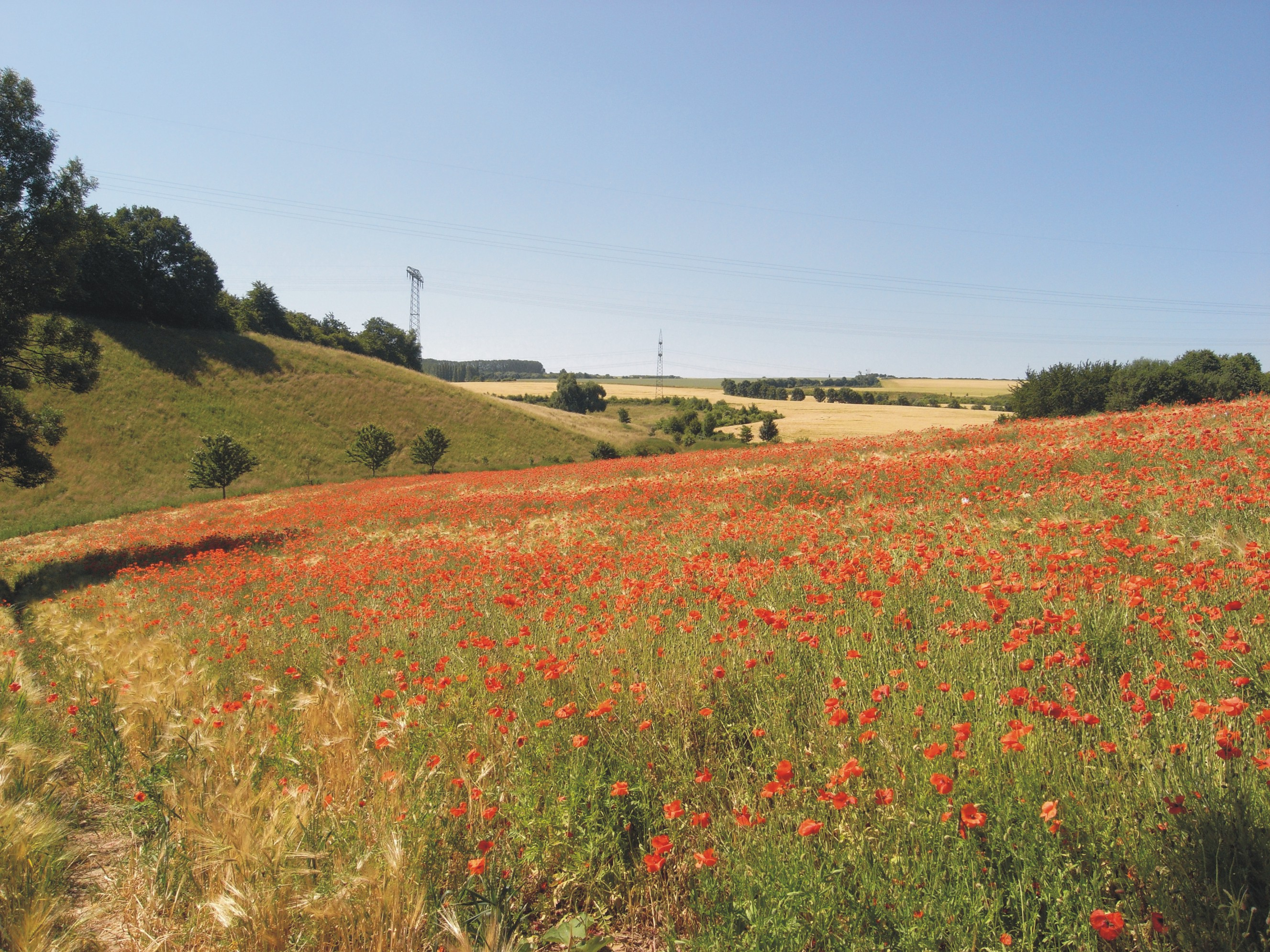

Location
- Country: Germany
- States: Saxony

Physical characteristics
- Mouth: Koitzschgraben
  - coordinates: 51.0152°N 13.7778°E

Basin features
- Progression: Koitzschgraben→ Landgraben→ Elbe→ North Sea

The Leubnitzbach is a river of Saxony, Germany. It flows through Leubnitz-Neuostra, a city district of Dresden.

== See also ==
- List of rivers of Saxony
