= Zschampert =

River in Germany

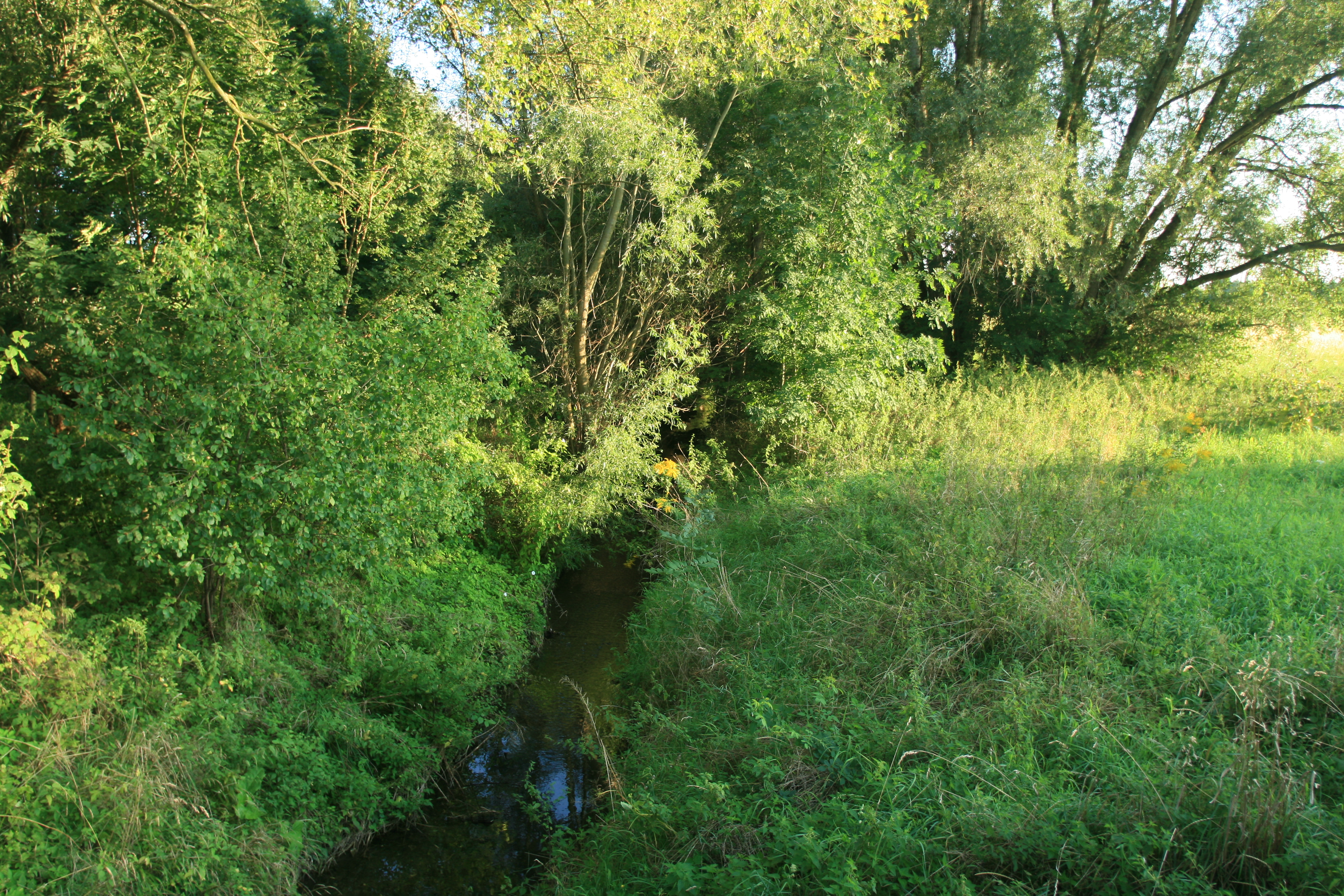

Location
- Country: Germany
- State: Saxony

Physical characteristics
- Mouth
  - coordinates: 51.29444°N 12.24951°E

The Zschampert is a small river in Saxony, Germany. It has a significant historical importance related to regional brown coal (lignite) mining and environmental history.

== History and hydrological changes ==
Due to underground brown coal mining in the region around Göhrenz, Albersdorf and Kulkwitz, witch began in the mid-1860s commissioned by the Gewerkschaft Grube Mansfeld, the original source if the Zschampert-located between Seebenisch and Knautnaundorf directly on the former Prussian Saxonyborder dried up. The water extraction necessary for clearing fields caused a large-scale drop in the Groundwater table, resulting in the desiccation of the southern river course.

Today the above-ground course of the Zschampert begins in a roadside ditch along the country road leading from Kulkwitz to Göhrenz. From there it flows north along the eastern shore of the Kulkwitzer See before eventually emptying into Alte Luppe near Leipzig. The water ditch leading to the Kulkwitz shaft triangle was used for decades as a wastewater canal, causing severe pollution. Although water quality has improved significantly since the political changes of 1989/90, large sections of the river remain dry. The Zschampert is artificially supplied with water from the Kulkwitzer See via a pump, periodically to stabilize the water level of the post-mining lake.

Among the numerous human interventions in the river's natural course such as straightening east of the Kulkwitzer See and its relocation near the mouth due to the Merseburg Ost open-cast mine the 19th-century underground mining in its source area was the most massive disruption. Because it caused the permanent drying up of its origin, the remaining riverbed is of considerable mining and environmental historical significance, visibly demonstrating the irreversible ecological impact of early industrial mining activities.

== See also ==
- List of rivers of Saxony
