= Kotitzer Wasser =

River in Germany

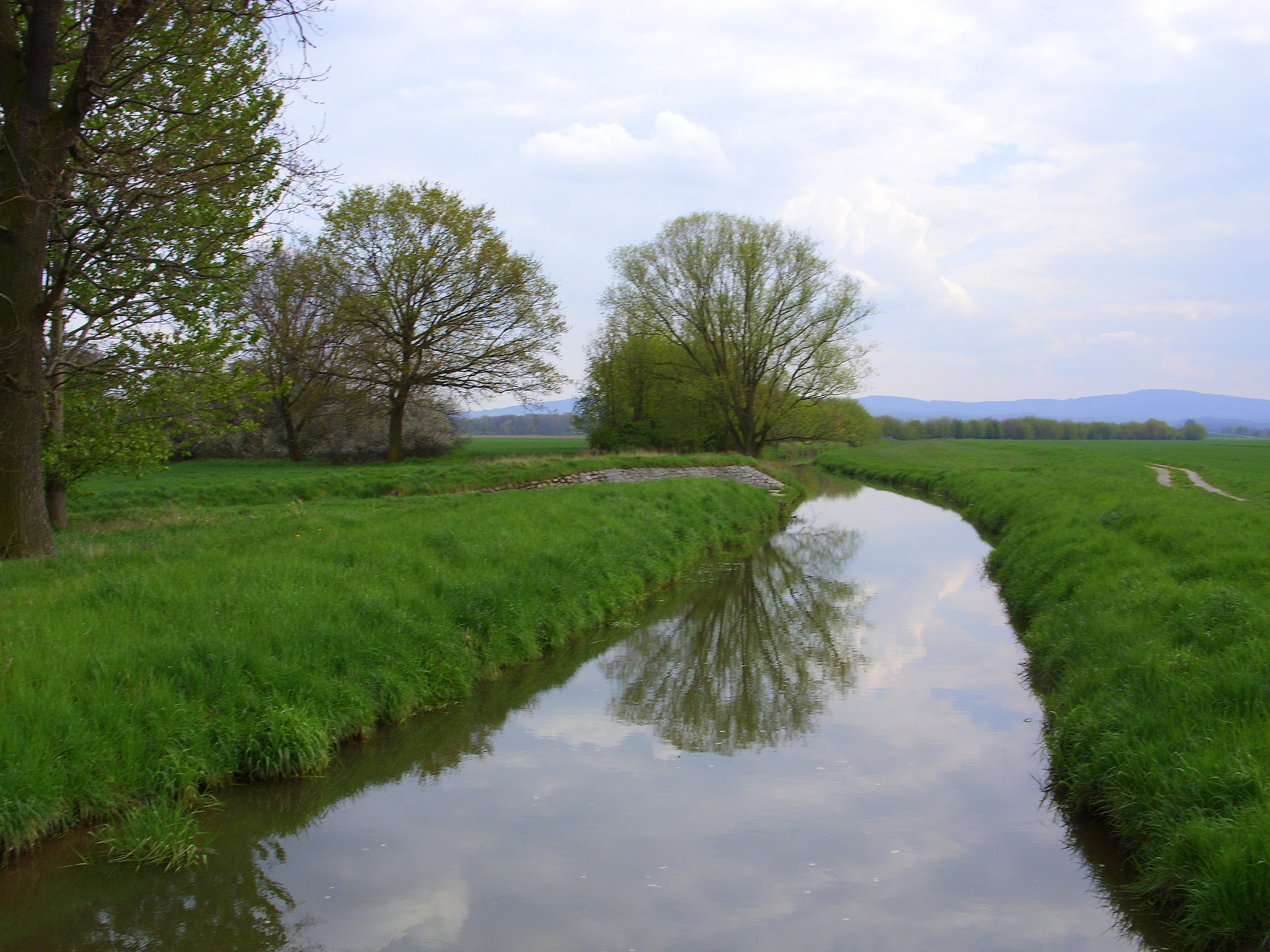

Location
- Country: Germany
- States: Saxony

Physical characteristics
- Mouth
  - location: Löbauer Wasser
  - coordinates: 51.2565°N 14.5569°E

Basin features
- Progression: Löbauer Wasser→ Spree→ Havel→ Elbe→ North Sea

Kotitzer Wasser is a river of Saxony, Germany. It is a left tributary of the Löbauer Wasser, which it joins near Malschwitz.

== See also ==
- List of rivers of Saxony
