= Friesenbach =

River in Germany

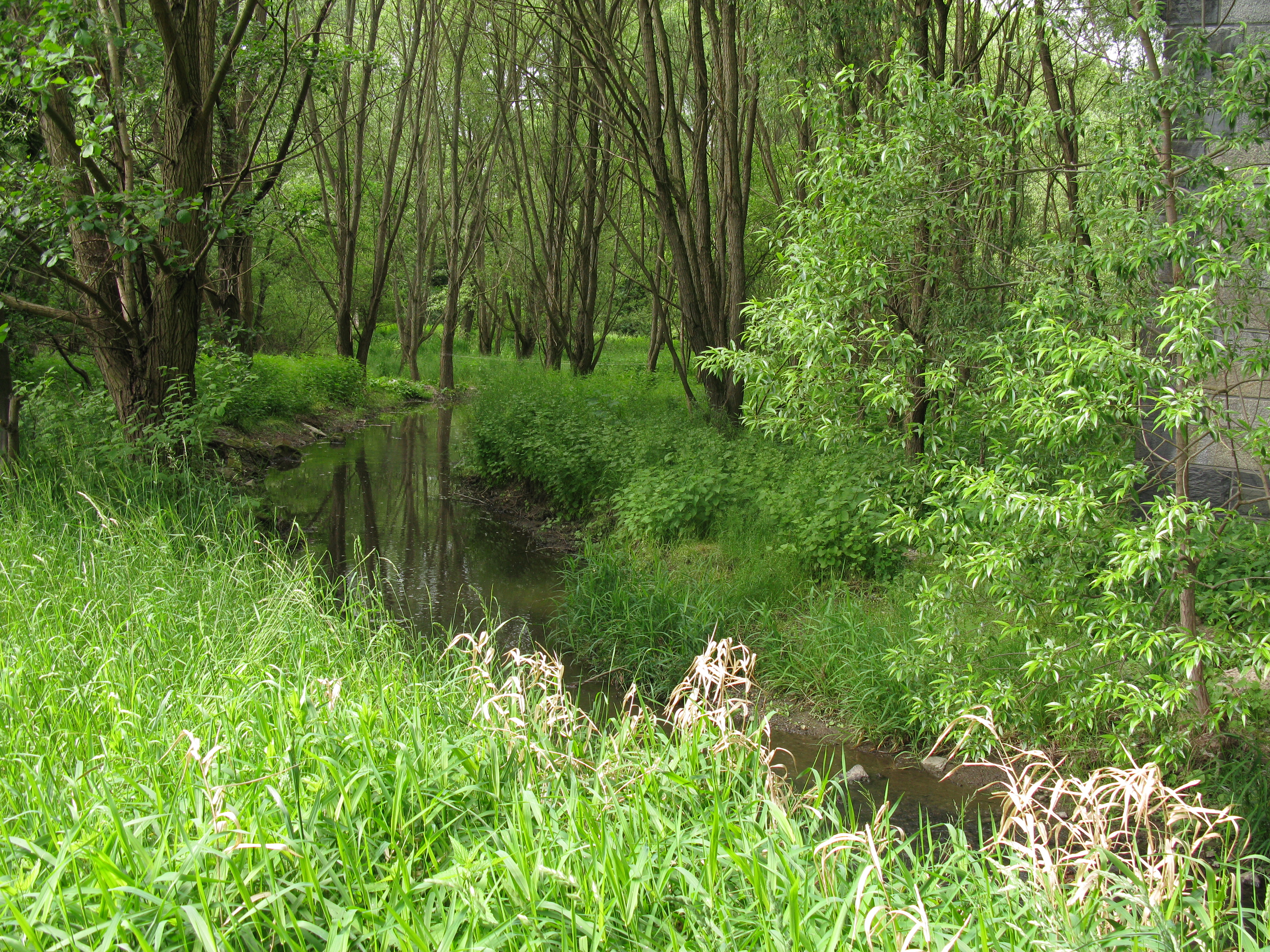

Location
- Country: Germany
- State: Saxony

Physical characteristics
- Mouth
  - location: White Elster
  - coordinates: 50.5141°N 12.1655°E

Basin features
- Progression: White Elster→ Saale→ Elbe→ North Sea

The Friesenbach is a river of Saxony, Germany. It is a right tributary of the White Elster, which it joins near Plauen.

== See also ==
- List of rivers of Saxony
