= Kleine Pyra =

River in Germany

Location
- Country: Germany
- States: Saxony

Physical characteristics
- Mouth
  - location: Zwickauer Mulde
  - coordinates: 50.4514°N 12.4737°E

Basin features
- Progression: Zwickauer Mulde→ Mulde→ Elbe→ North Sea

Kleine Pyra is a river of Saxony, Germany. It is a right tributary of the Zwickauer Mulde, which it joins near Tannenbergsthal.

== See also ==
- List of rivers of Saxony
