= Syrabach =

River in Germany

Location
- Country: Germany
- State: Saxony

Physical characteristics
- Source
  - location: Vogtland (Saxony, Germany)
- Mouth
  - location: White Elster
  - coordinates: 50.4927°N 12.1411°E

Basin features
- Progression: White Elster→ Saale→ Elbe→ North Sea

The Syrabach is a river of Saxony, Germany. It is a left tributary of the White Elster, which it joins in Plauen.

== See also ==
- List of rivers of Saxony
