= Borlasbach =

River in Germany

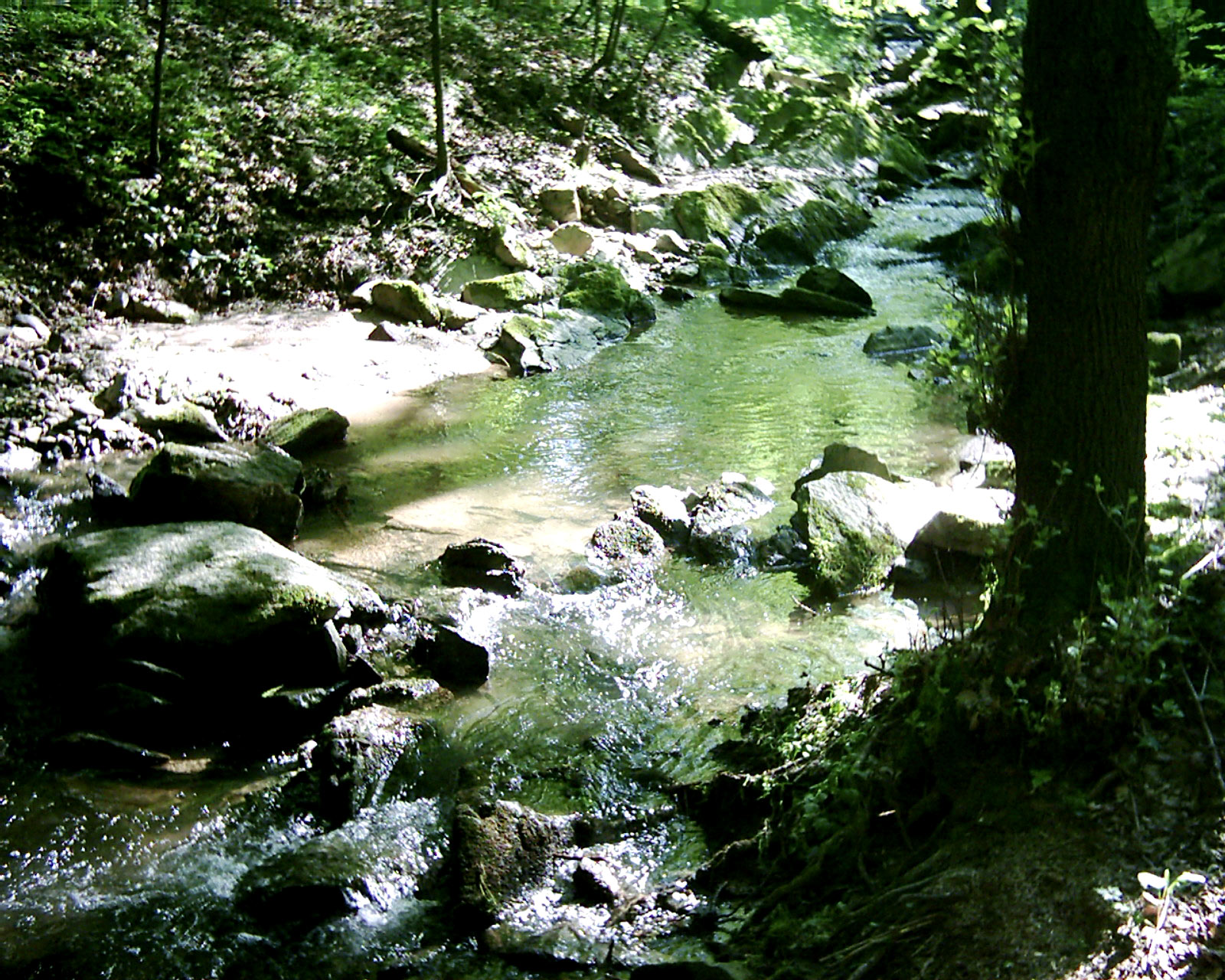

Location
- Country: Germany
- State: Saxony

Physical characteristics
- Mouth
  - location: Rote Weißeritz
  - coordinates: 50.9269°N 13.6557°E

Basin features
- Progression: Red Weißeritz→ Weißeritz→ Elbe→ North Sea

The Borlasbach is a river of Saxony, Germany. It is a left tributary of the Rote Weißeritz, which it joins near Rabenau.

== See also ==
- List of rivers of Saxony
