= Feilebach =

River in Germany

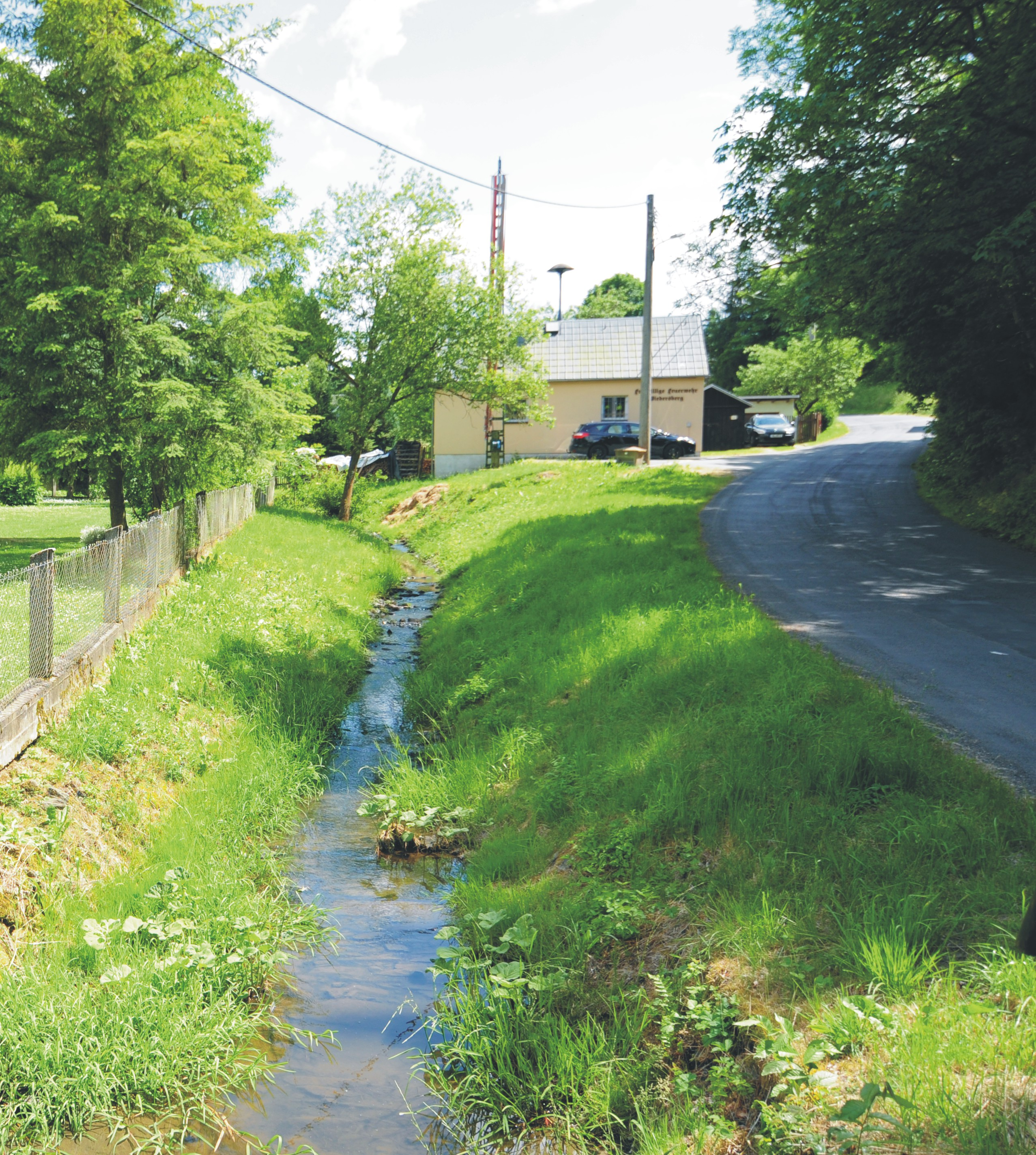

Location
- Country: Germany
- State: Saxony

Physical characteristics
- Mouth
  - location: White Elster
  - coordinates: 50.4277°N 12.0733°E

Basin features
- Progression: White Elster→ Saale→ Elbe→ North Sea

The Feilebach is a river of Saxony, Germany. It is a left tributary of the White Elster, which it joins near Weischlitz.

== See also ==
- List of rivers of Saxony
