= Rosenbach (White Elster) =

River in Germany

Location
- Country: Germany
- States: Vogtland, Saxony

Physical characteristics
- Source
  - elevation: 428 m (1,404 ft)
- Mouth
  - location: White Elster
  - coordinates: 50.4739°N 12.0829°E
  - elevation: 343 m (1,125 ft)
- Length: 10.4 m (34 ft)
- Basin size: 67.2 km^{2} (25.9 sq mi)

Basin features
- Progression: White Elster→ Saale→ Elbe→ North Sea

The Rosenbach is a river of Saxony, Germany. It is a left tributary of the White Elster, which it joins near Plauen.

== See also ==
- List of rivers of Saxony
