= Pietzschebach =

River in Germany

Location
- Country: Germany
- Location: Saxony

Physical characteristics
- Mouth
  - location: White Elster
  - coordinates: 50°31′15″N 12°09′49″E

Basin features
- Progression: White Elster→ Saale→ Elbe→ North Sea

The Pietzschebach is a river of Saxony, Germany. It rises in Haselbrunn, Plauen and runs into the river White Elster. It is 3.5 km (2.2 mi) long.

== See also ==
- List of rivers of Saxony
