= Mühlgrundbach =

River in Germany

Location
- Country: Germany
- States: Saxony

Physical characteristics
- Mouth
  - location: Elbe
  - coordinates: 50°53′45″N 14°13′24″E

Basin features
- Progression: Elbe→ North Sea

The Mühlgrundbach is a river of Saxony, Germany. It flows into the Elbe near the Schöna railway station, opposite the village Schmilka.

== See also ==
- List of rivers of Saxony
