= Paußnitz =

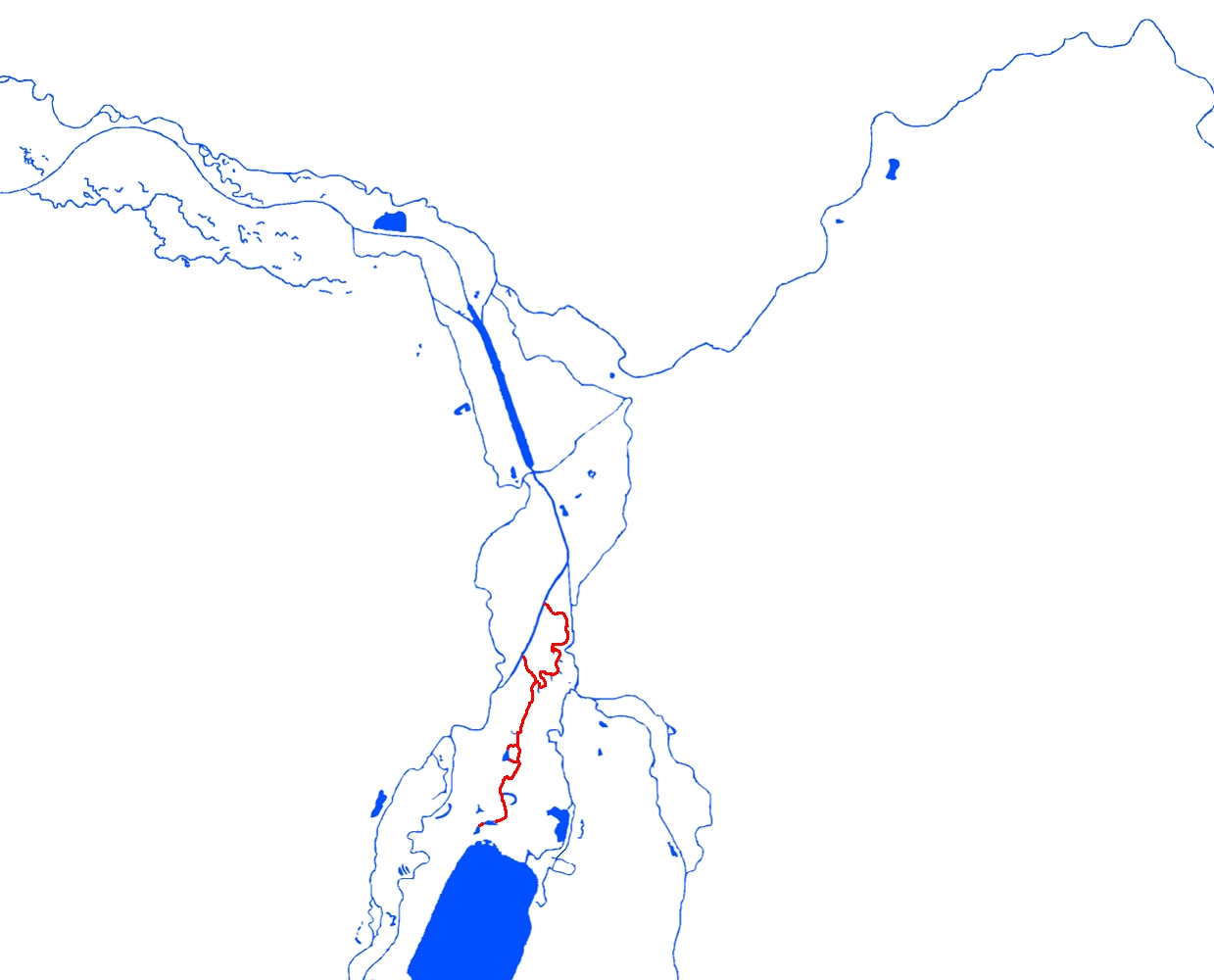
- The Paußnitz in red

Location
- Country: Germany
- State: Saxony

Physical characteristics
- Mouth
  - coordinates: 51.3169°N 12.3522°E

The Paußnitz is a river of Saxony, Germany. It is a branch of the White Elster near Leipzig.

== See also ==
- List of rivers of Saxony
- Bodies of water in Leipzig
