= Krebsgraben =

River in Germany

Coordinates: 51.2543°N 12.2846°E

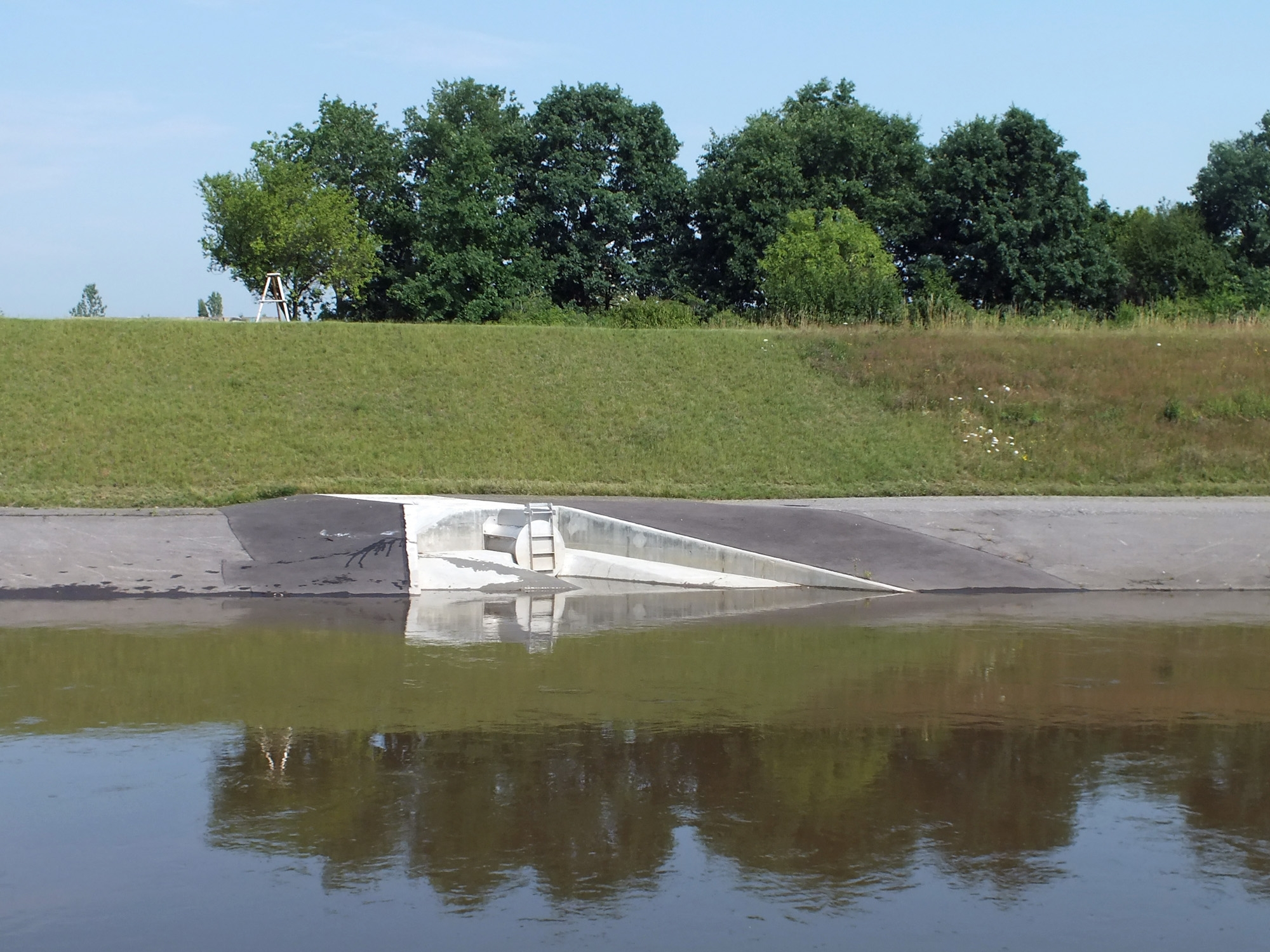

Location
- Country: Germany
- States: Saxony

Physical characteristics
- Mouth

Basin features
- Progression: White Elster→ Saale→ Elbe→ North Sea

The Krebsgraben is a river of Saxony, Germany. It flows into the White Elster near Leipzig.

Historically, it was known as the Luppe or the southern Luppe. The Krebsgraben originates near Großschkorlopp, a district of Kitzen, and flows northeast through Knautnaundorf before emptying into the White Elster near the Knautnaundorf industrial area. The river has a length of approximately 7.57 kilometers, with about 1.98 kilometers running through the city of Leipzig.

== See also ==
- List of rivers of Saxony
