= Kleine Triebisch =

River in Germany

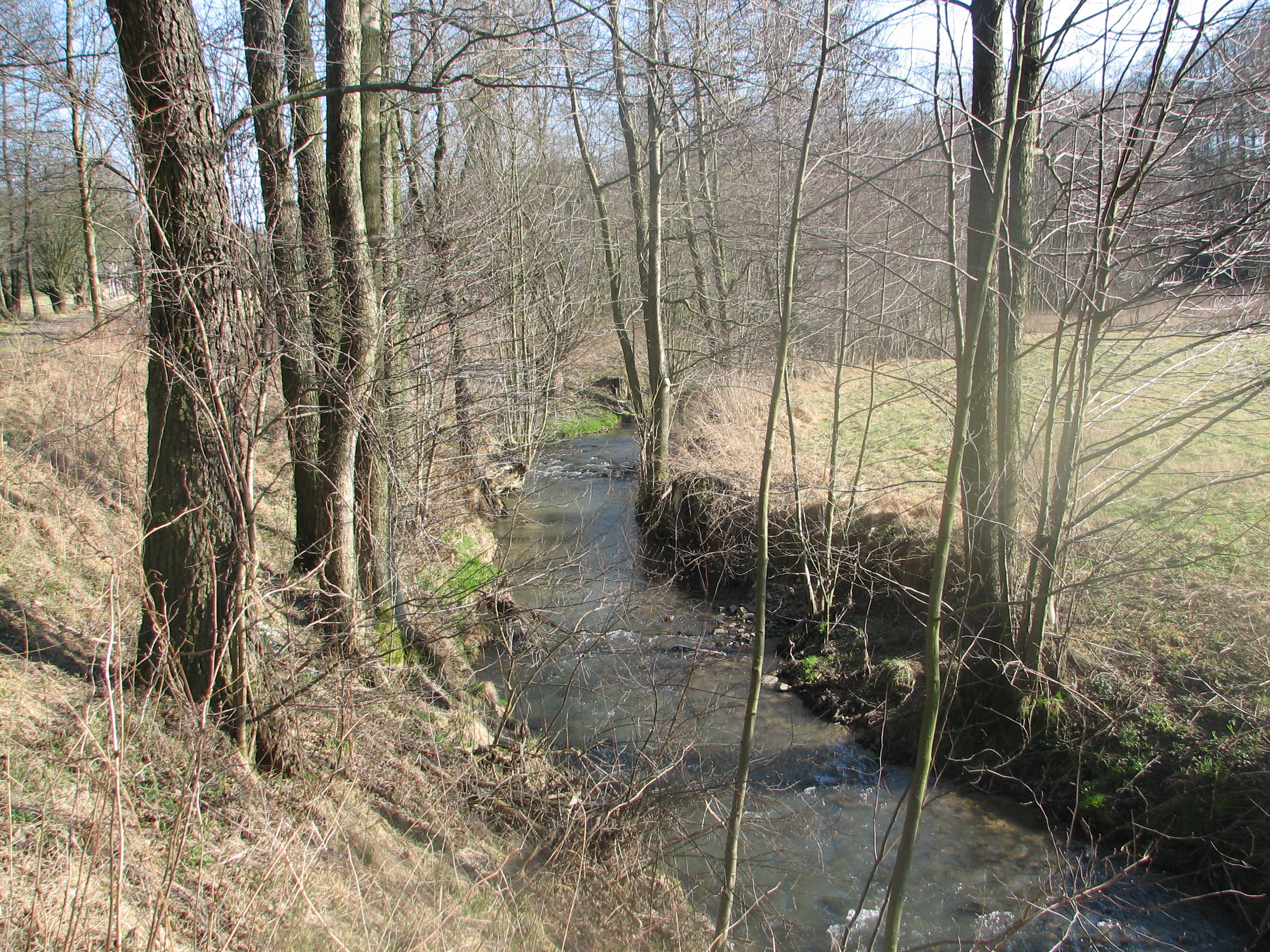

Location
- Country: Germany
- States: Saxony

Physical characteristics
- Mouth
  - location: Triebisch
  - coordinates: 51.1258°N 13.4319°E

Basin features
- Progression: Triebisch→ Elbe→ North Sea

Kleine Triebisch is a river of Saxony, Germany. It is a right tributary of the Triebisch, which it joins in Garsebach.

== See also ==
- List of rivers of Saxony
