= Schwarzer Graben (Elbe) =

River in Germany

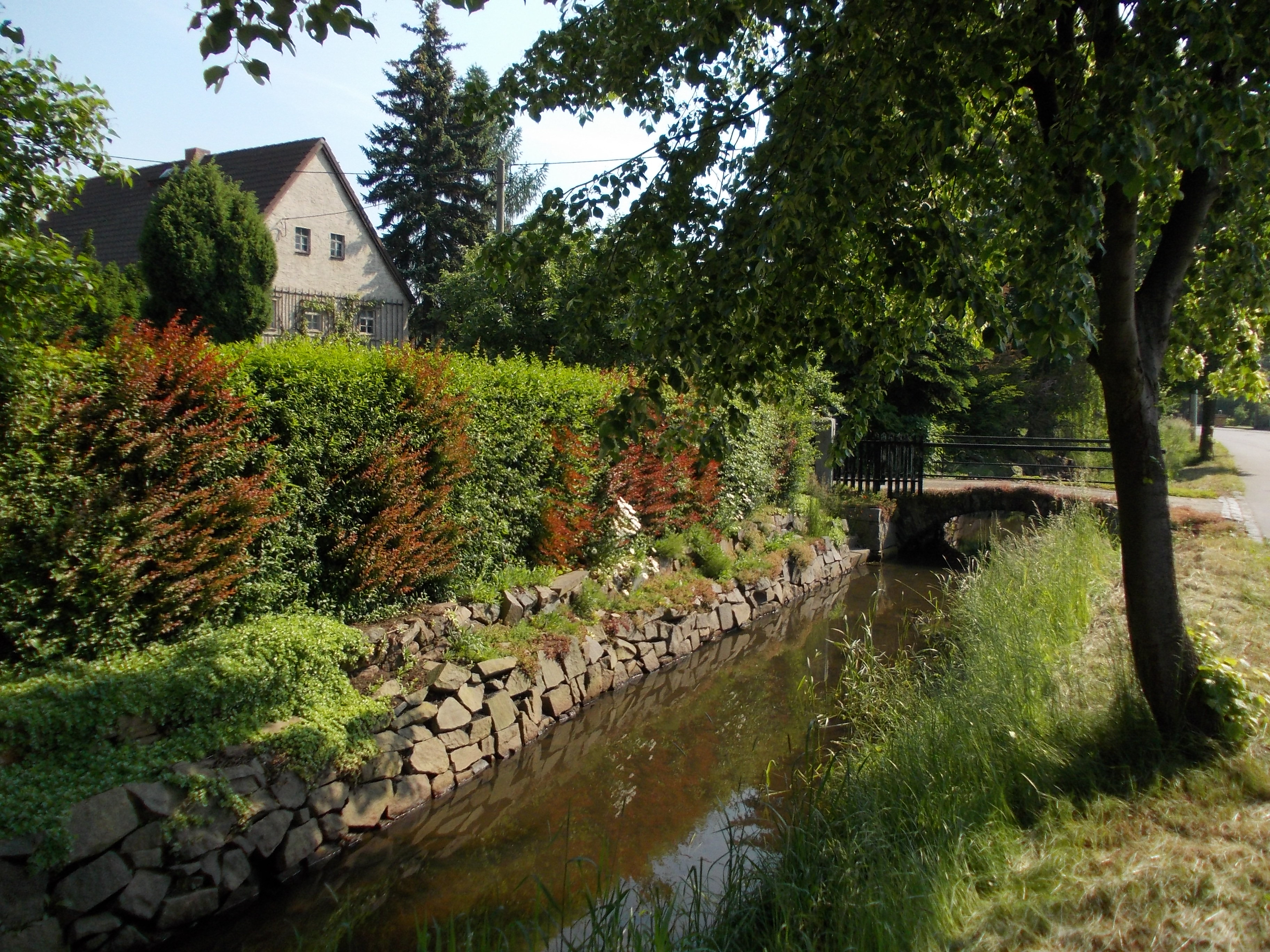

Location
- Country: Germany
- State: Saxony

Physical characteristics
- Source
  - location: East of Böhlitz as Schwarzer Bach
  - coordinates: 51.4380°N 12.7642°E
- Mouth
  - location: As Weinske near Dommitzsch into the Elbe
  - coordinates: 51.6460°N 12.9082°E

Basin features
- Progression: Elbe→ North Sea

The Schwarzer Graben is a river of Saxony, Germany.

It springs east of Böhlitz, a district of Thallwitz; its upper course is called Schwarzer Bach.

The lower course of the Schwarzer Graben is called Weinske; it is a left tributary of the Elbe, which it joins near Dommitzsch.

== See also ==
- List of rivers of Saxony
