= Eastern Rietzschke =

River in Germany

Coordinates: 51.3432°N 12.4222°E

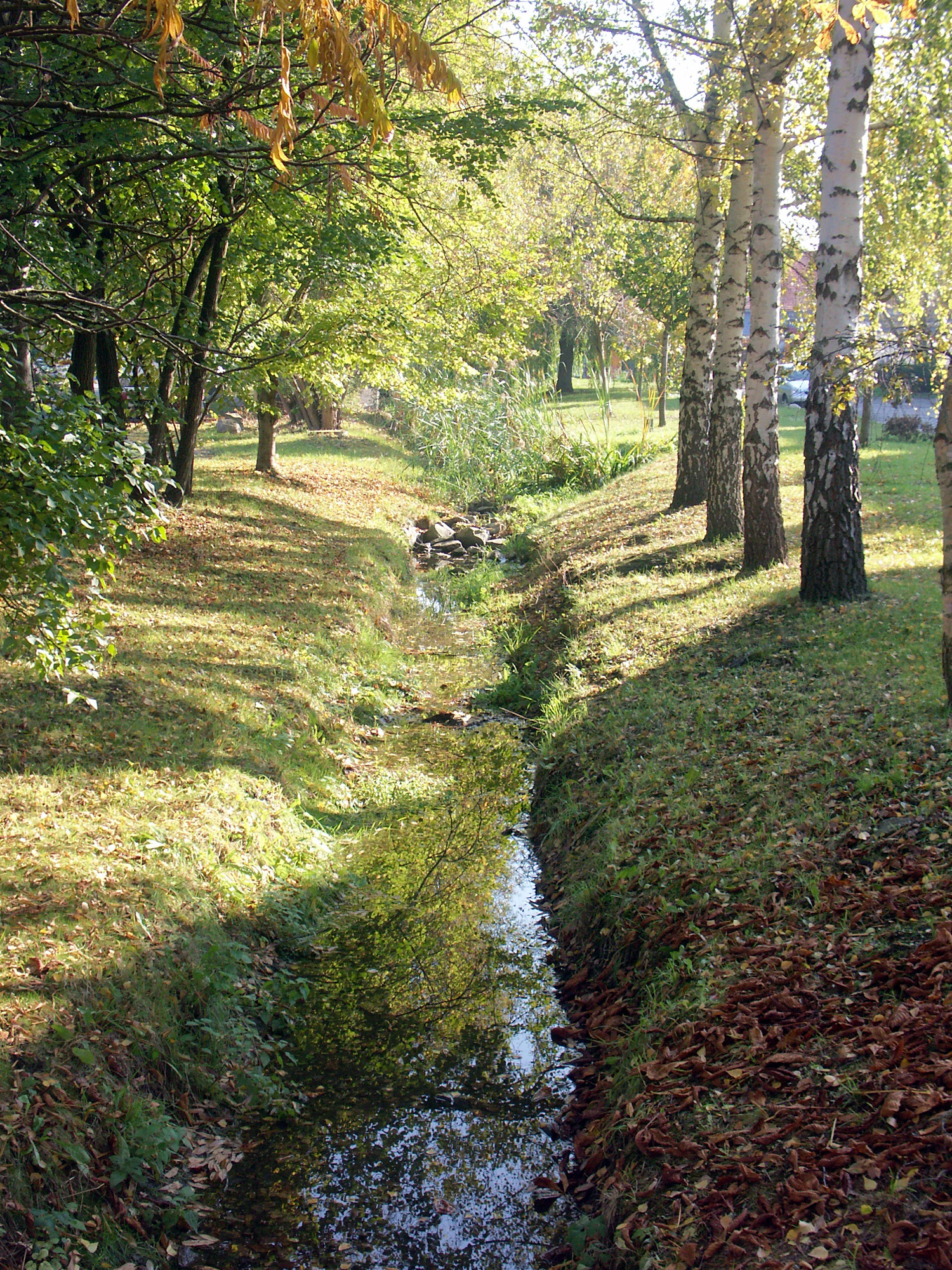
- Native name: Östliche Rietzschke (German)

Location
- Country: Germany
- State: Saxony

Physical characteristics
- Length: 7,220 m

Basin features
- River system: Elbe

The Eastern Rietzschke (German: Östliche Rietzschke) is a river flowing through Leipzig.

== See also ==
- List of rivers of Saxony
- Bodies of water in Leipzig
