= Quänebach =

River of Germany

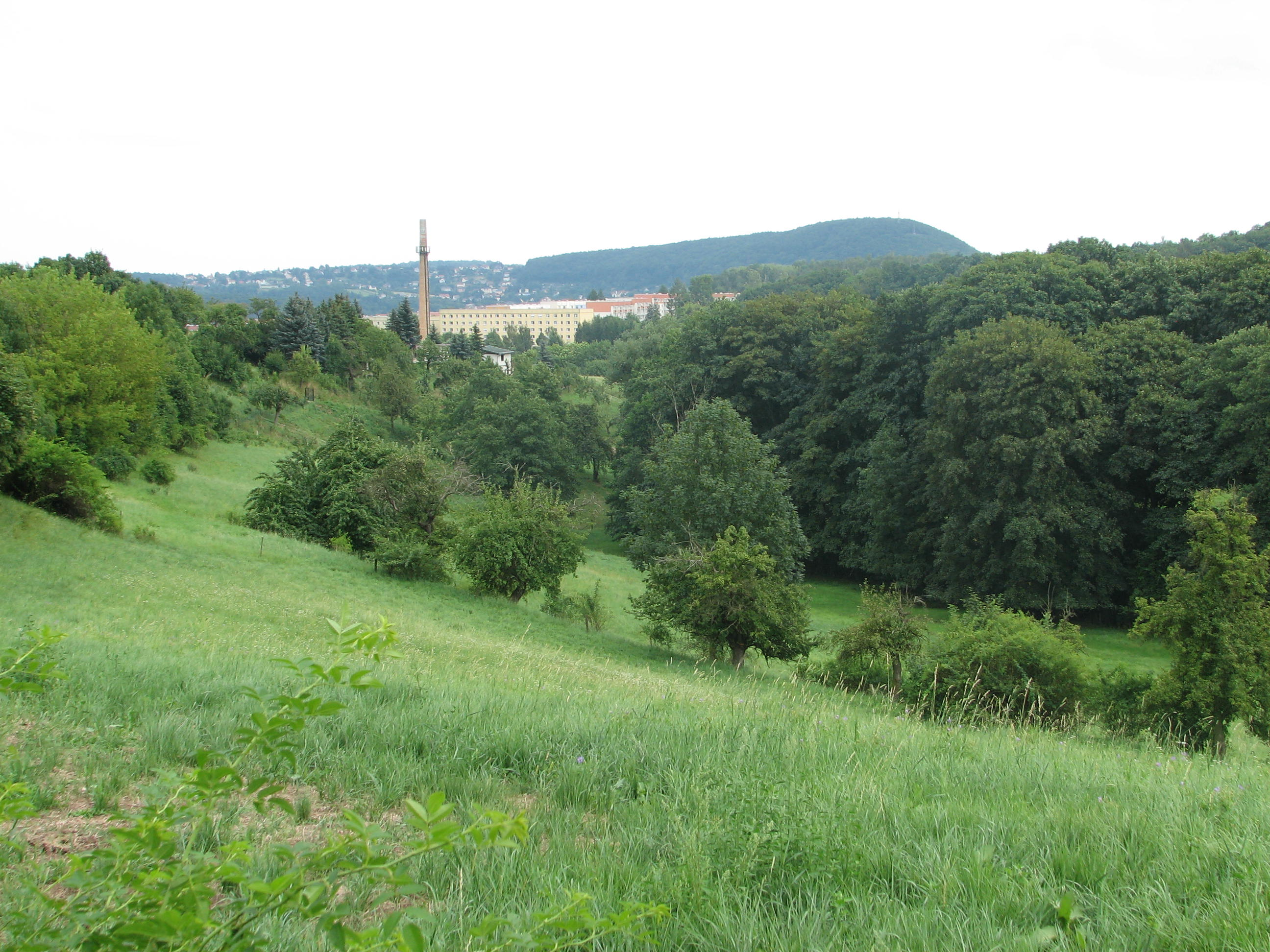

Location
- Country: Germany
- States: Saxony

Physical characteristics
- Mouth
  - location: Wiederitz
  - coordinates: 51.0190°N 13.6339°E

Basin features
- Progression: Wiederitz→ Weißeritz→ Elbe→ North Sea

The Quänebach is a river of Saxony, Germany. It flows into the Wiederitz in Zauckerode.

== See also ==
- List of rivers of Saxony
