= Langes Wasser =

River in Germany

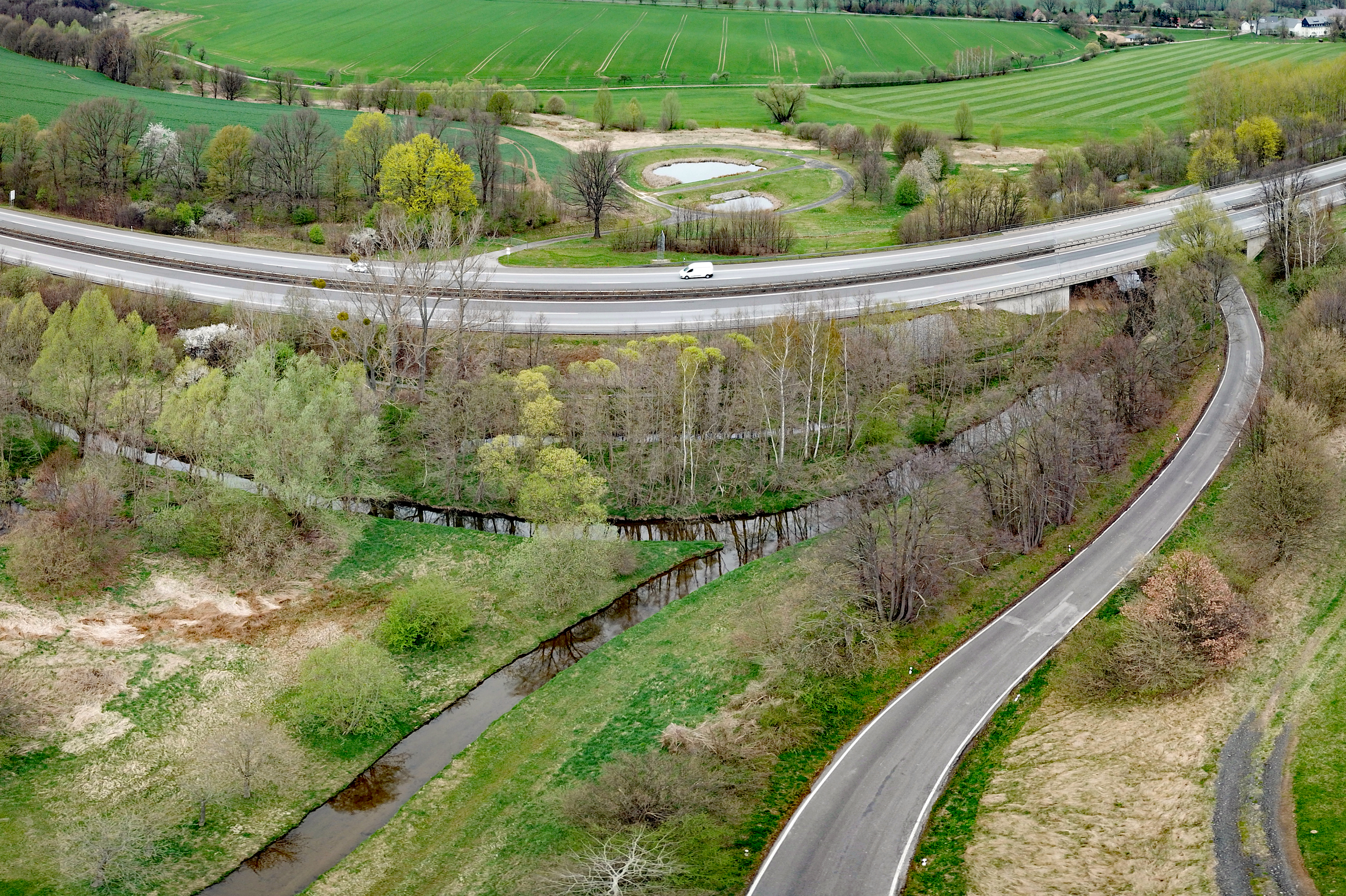

Location
- Country: Germany
- States: Saxony

Physical characteristics
- Mouth
  - location: Hoyerswerdaer Schwarzwasser
  - coordinates: 51.2024°N 14.2982°E

Basin features
- Progression: Hoyerswerdaer Schwarzwasser→ Black Elster→ Elbe→ North Sea

Langes Wasser is a river of Saxony, Germany. It is a right tributary of the Hoyerswerdaer Schwarzwasser, which it joins in Pietzschwitz.

== See also ==
- List of rivers of Saxony
