= Lausenbach =

River in Germany

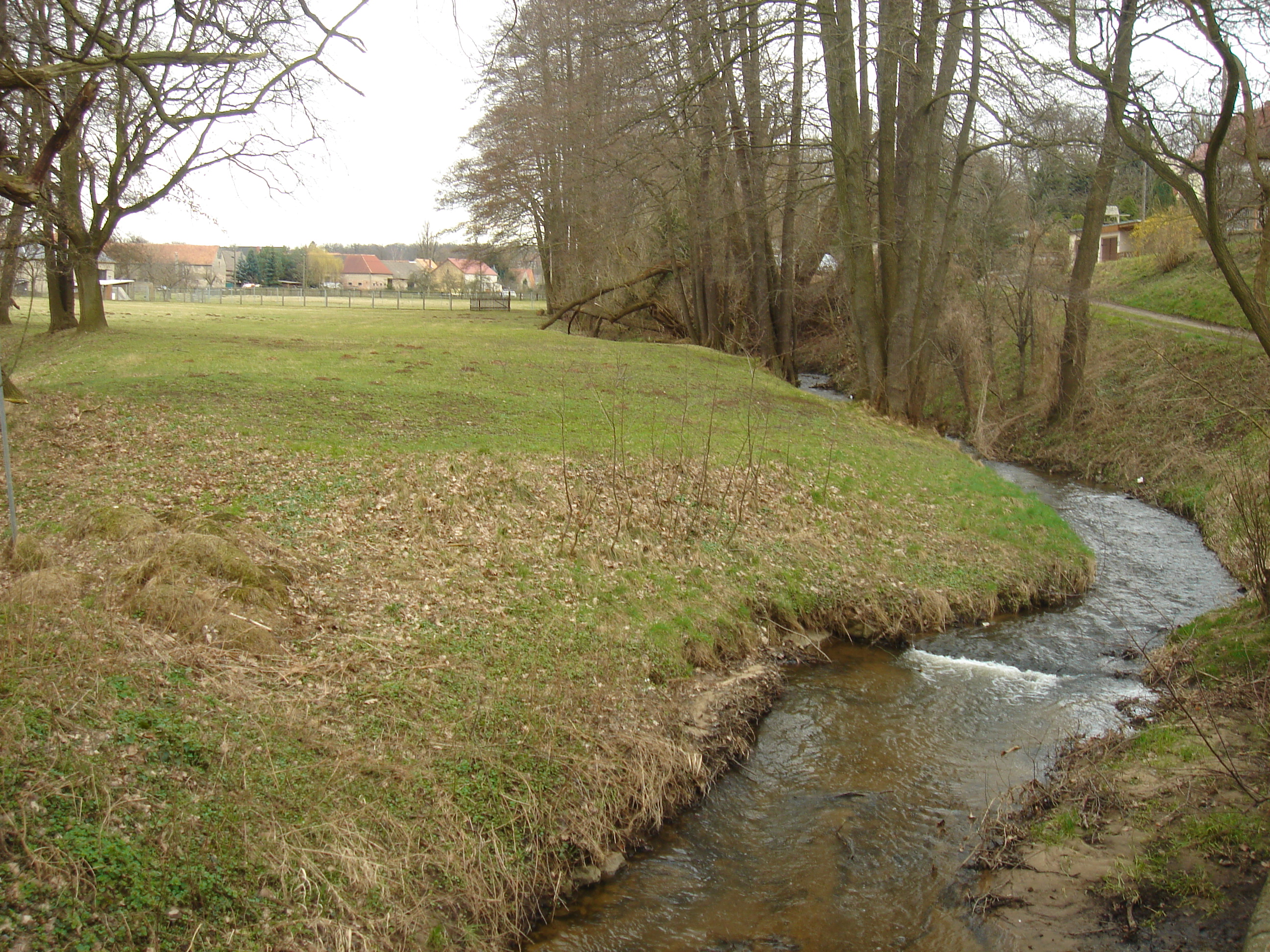

Location
- Country: Germany
- States: Saxony

Physical characteristics
- Mouth
  - location: Große Röder
  - coordinates: 51.1718°N 13.8151°E

Basin features
- Progression: Große Röder→ Black Elster→ Elbe→ North Sea

The Lausenbach is a river of Saxony, Germany. It is a tributary of the Große Röder, which it joins in Ottendorf-Okrilla.

== See also ==
- List of rivers of Saxony
