= Legnitzka =

River in Germany

Location
- Country: Germany
- States: Saxony

Physical characteristics
- Mouth
  - location: Lusatian Neisse
  - coordinates: 51.5375°N 14.7268°E

Basin features
- Progression: Lusatian Neisse→ Oder→ Baltic Sea

Legnitzka, also Lugknitzka, is a small river of Saxony, Germany. It flows into the Lusatian Neisse near Bad Muskau, opposite the Polish town Łęknica.

== See also ==
- List of rivers of Saxony
