= Verlorenes Wasser =

River in Germany

Location
- Country: Germany
- State: Saxony

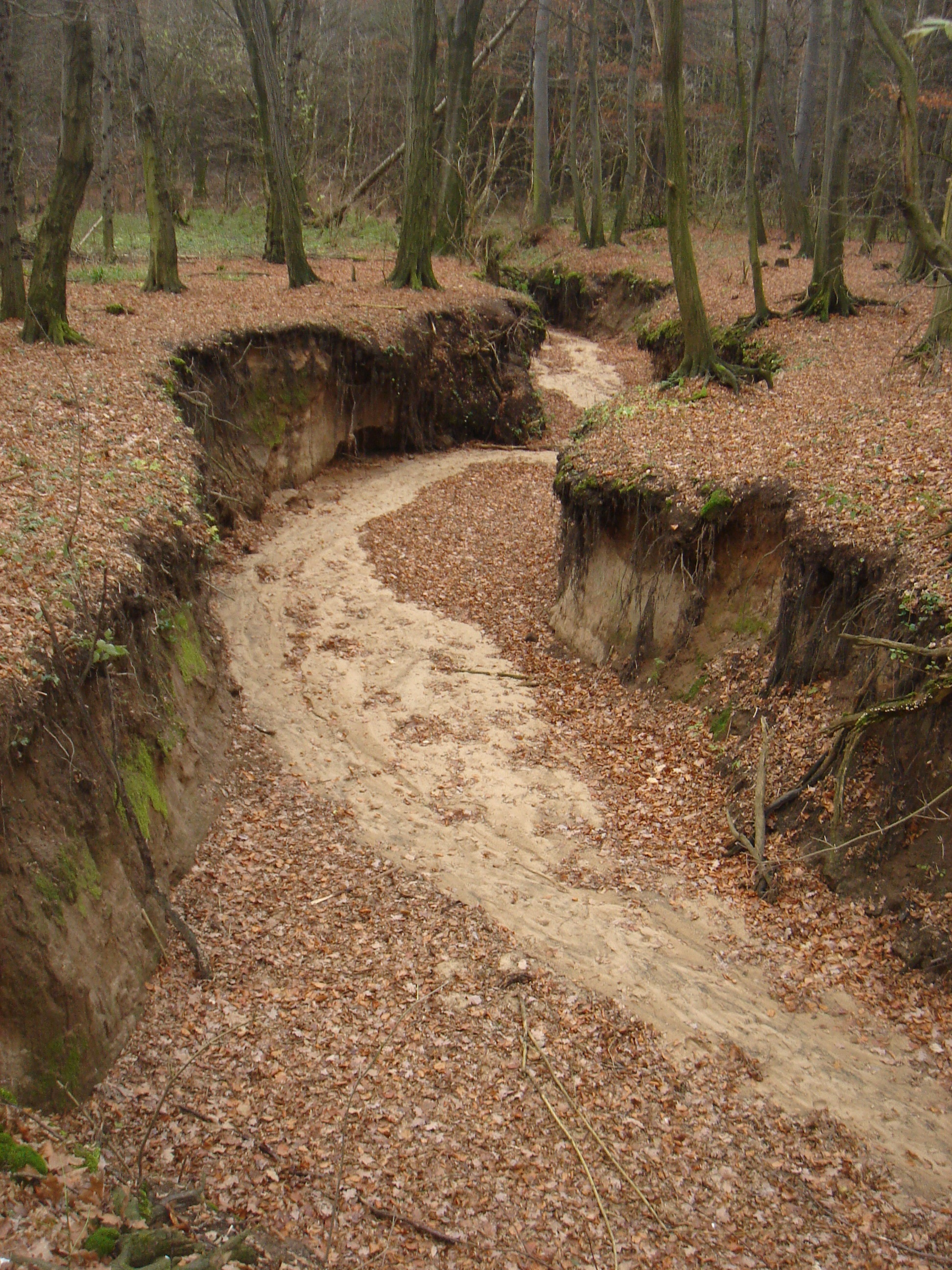
Verlorenes Wasser in Moritzburg (English: Lost Water)

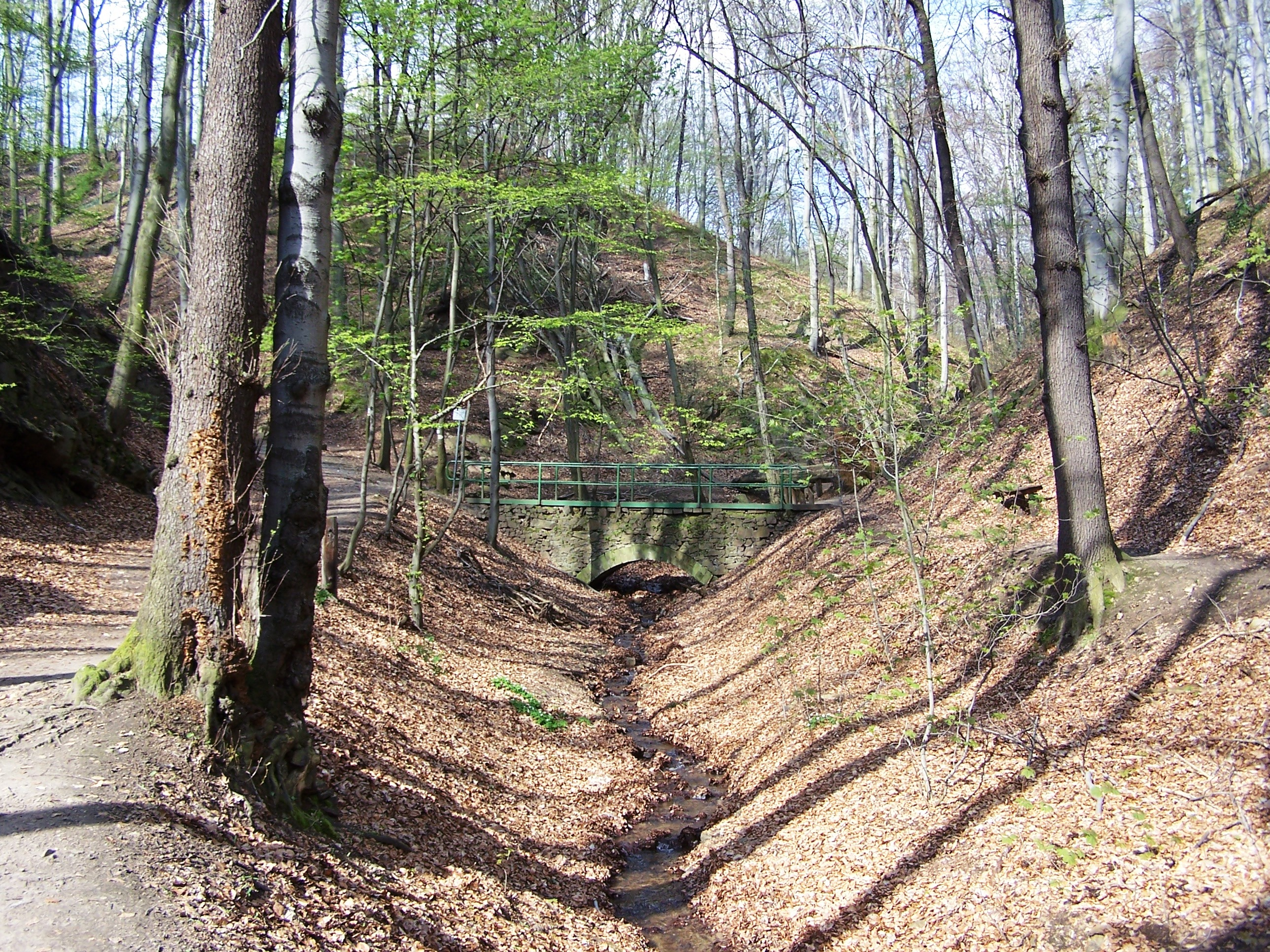
Fiedlergrund in Radebeul (English: Fiedler Ground)

Verlorenes Wasser (English: Lost Water) is the name given to several streams on the right-hand perimeter of the Dresden Basin in Saxony, Germany, in some cases as their proper name, in others as a colloquial name.

== See also ==
- List of rivers of Saxony
