= Rotes Wasser (Müglitz) =

River in Germany

Location
- Country: Germany
- State: Saxony

Physical characteristics
- Source
  - location: between Altenberg and Geising
  - coordinates: 50.7592°N 13.7765°E
- Mouth
  - location: near Lauenstein, a district of Altenberg
  - coordinates: 50.7861°N 13.8147°E

Rotes Wasser is a river of Saxony, Germany. It is a right tributary of the Müglitz.

== See also ==
- List of rivers of Saxony
