= Oberhermsdorfer Bach =

River of Germany

Location
- Country: Germany
- States: Saxony

Physical characteristics
- Mouth
  - location: Wiederitz
  - coordinates: 51°01′25″N 13°37′14″E

Basin features
- Progression: Wiederitz→ Weißeritz→ Elbe→ North Sea

The Oberhermsdorfer Bach is a river of Saxony, Germany. It flows into the Wiederitz in Freital.

== See also ==
- List of rivers of Saxony
