= Kemmlitzbach =

River in Germany

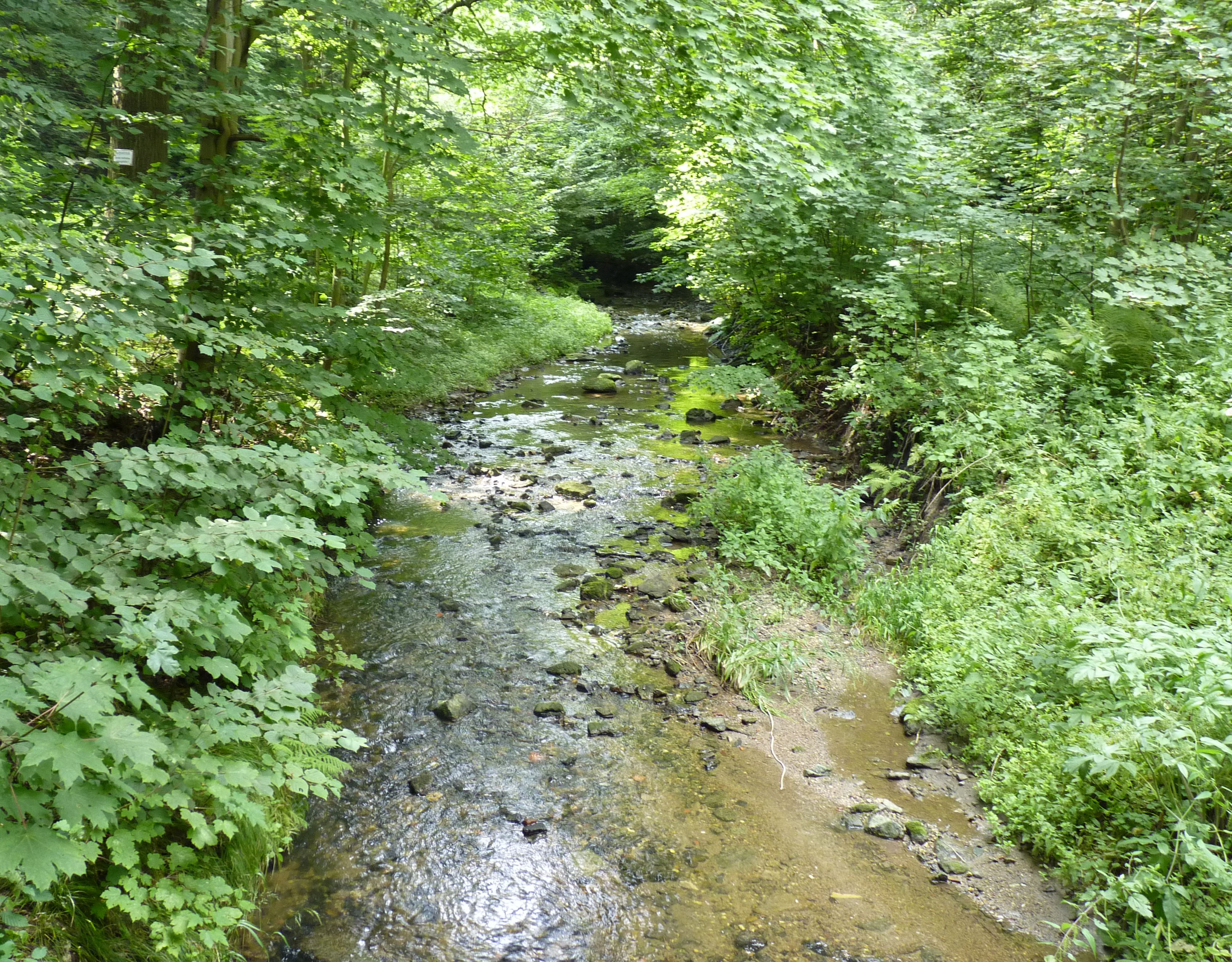

Location
- Country: Germany
- States: Saxony

Physical characteristics
- Mouth
  - location: Lausitzer Neiße
  - coordinates: 50.9525°N 14.8949°E

Basin features
- Progression: Lusatian Neisse→ Oder→ Baltic Sea

The Kemmlitzbach is a river of Saxony, Germany. It is a left tributary of the Lausitzer Neiße, which it joins in Hirschfelde near Zittau.

== See also ==
- List of rivers of Saxony
