= Wilzsch =

River in Germany

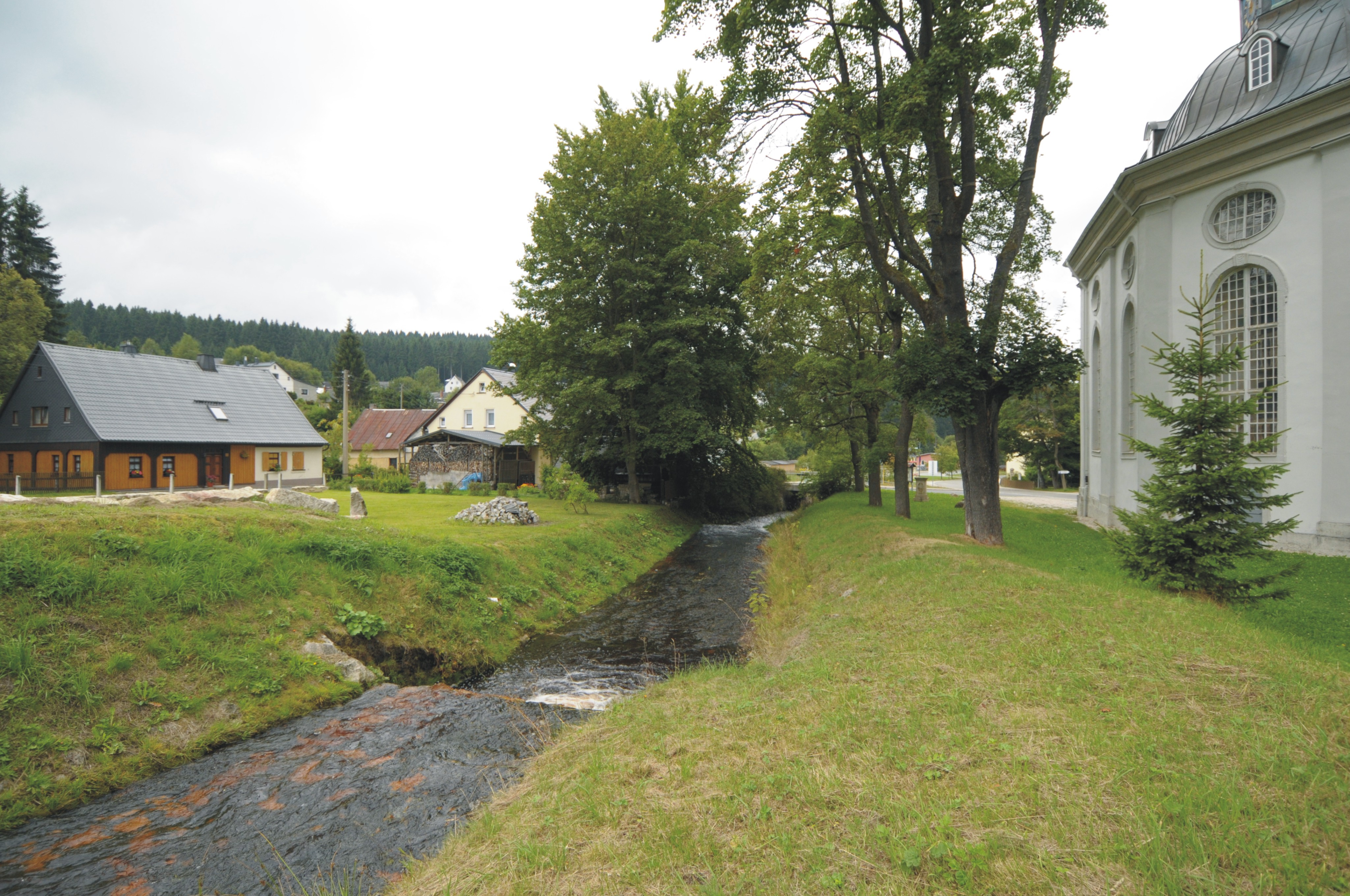

Location
- Country: Germany
- State: Saxony

Physical characteristics
- Mouth
  - location: Zwickauer Mulde
  - coordinates: 50.4733°N 12.5153°E

Basin features
- Progression: Zwickauer Mulde→ Mulde→ Elbe→ North Sea

The Wilzsch is a river in Saxony, Germany. It is a right tributary of the Zwickauer Mulde, which it joins near Schönheide.

== See also ==
- List of rivers of Saxony
