= Geberbach =

River in Germany

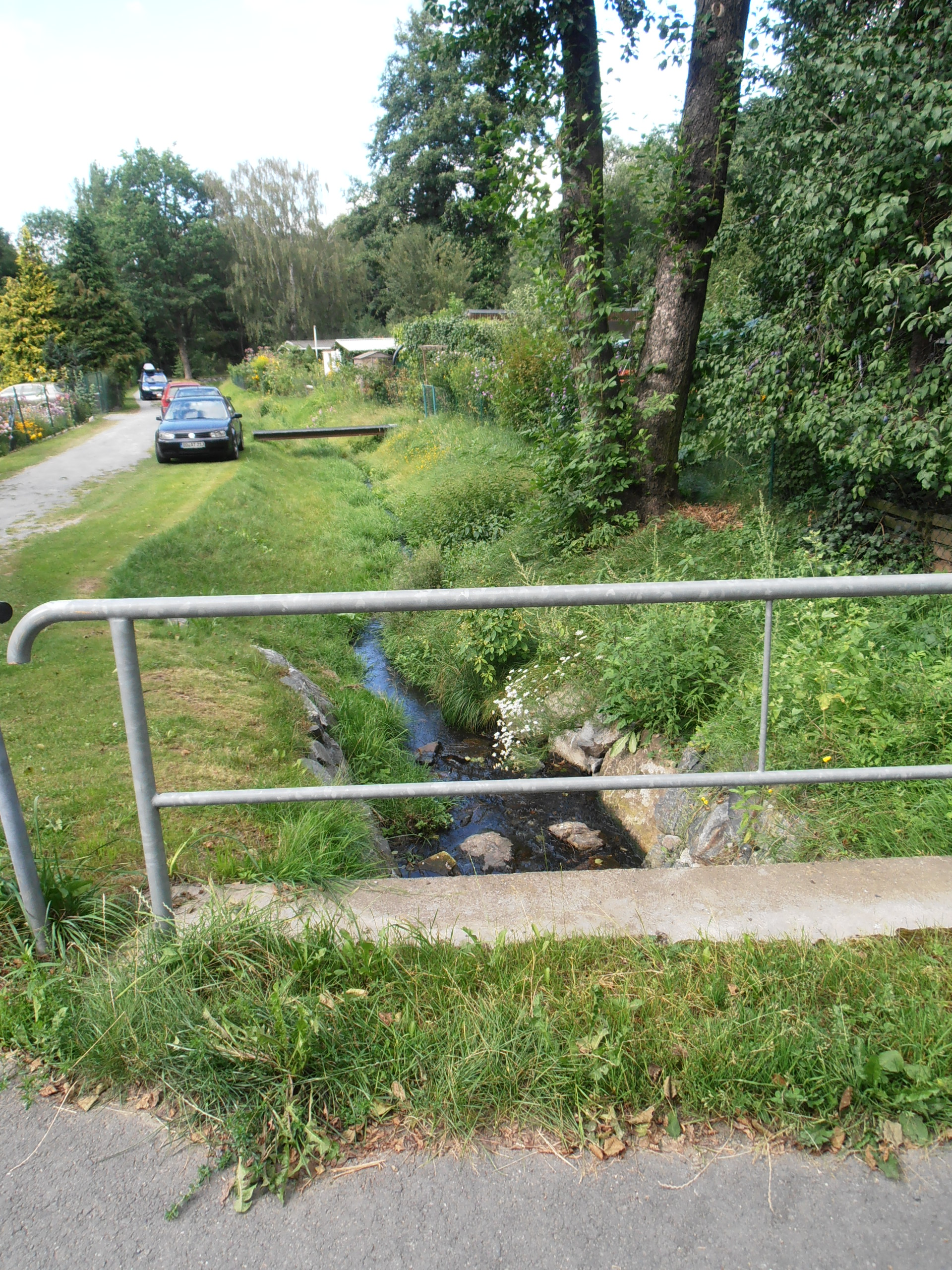

Location
- Country: Germany
- States: Saxony

Physical characteristics
- Mouth
  - location: Elbe
  - coordinates: 51.0352°N 13.8322°E

Basin features
- Progression: Elbe→ North Sea

The Geberbach is a small river of Saxony, Germany. It flows into the Elbe near Dresden.

== See also ==
- List of rivers of Saxony
