= Maltengraben =

River in Germany

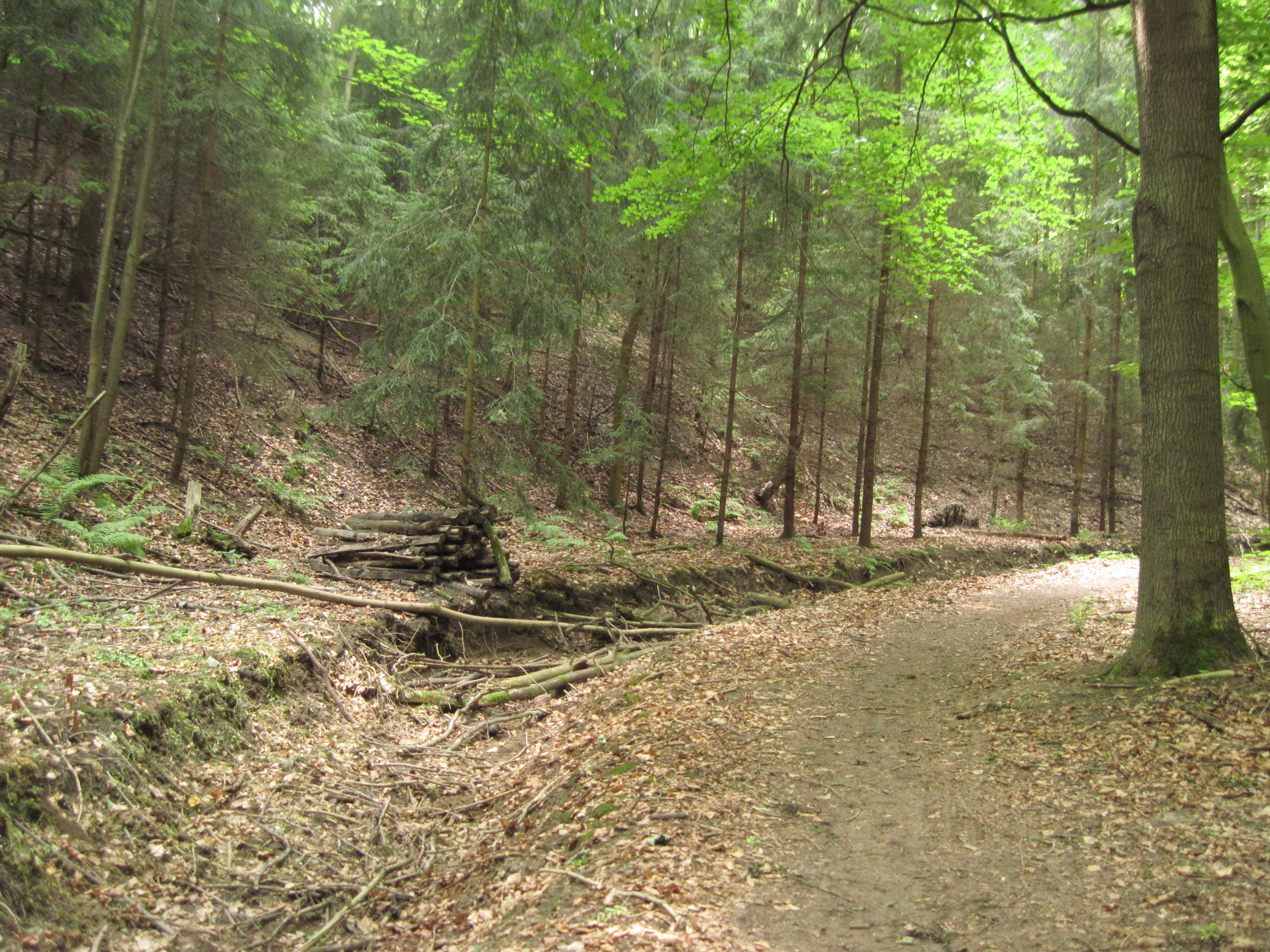

Location
- Country: Germany
- States: Saxony

Physical characteristics
- Mouth: Lockwitzbach
  - coordinates: 50.9967°N 13.8453°E

Basin features
- Progression: Lockwitzbach→ Elbe→ North Sea

The Maltengraben is a river of Saxony, Germany. It flows into the Lockwitzbach in Großzschachwitz, a city district of Dresden.

== See also ==
- List of rivers of Saxony
