= Kaitzbach =

River in Germany

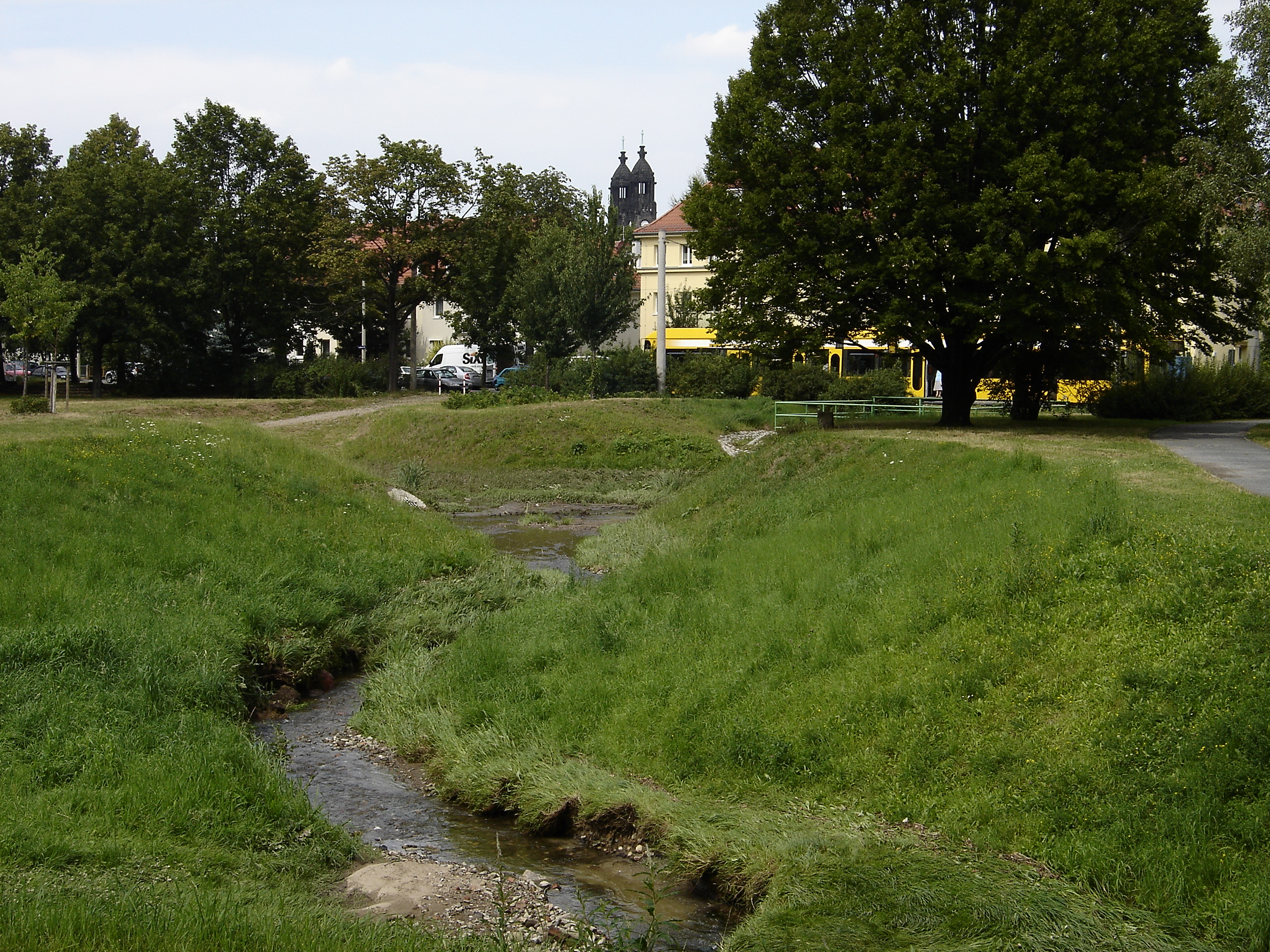

Location
- Country: Germany
- States: Saxony

Physical characteristics
- Mouth
  - coordinates: 51.0537°N 13.7463°E

Basin features
- Progression: Elbe→ North Sea

The Kaitzbach, formerly Kaiditzbach, is a small river of Saxony, Germany. It flows into the Elbe located in the south of Dresden. Its length is currently 11.92 kilometres, the average flow rate is about 35 litres per second. It was named after the village and now Dresdner district of Kaitz.

== See also ==
- List of rivers of Saxony
