= Schlumper =

River in Saxony, Germany

Coordinates: 51.2403°N 12.4735°E

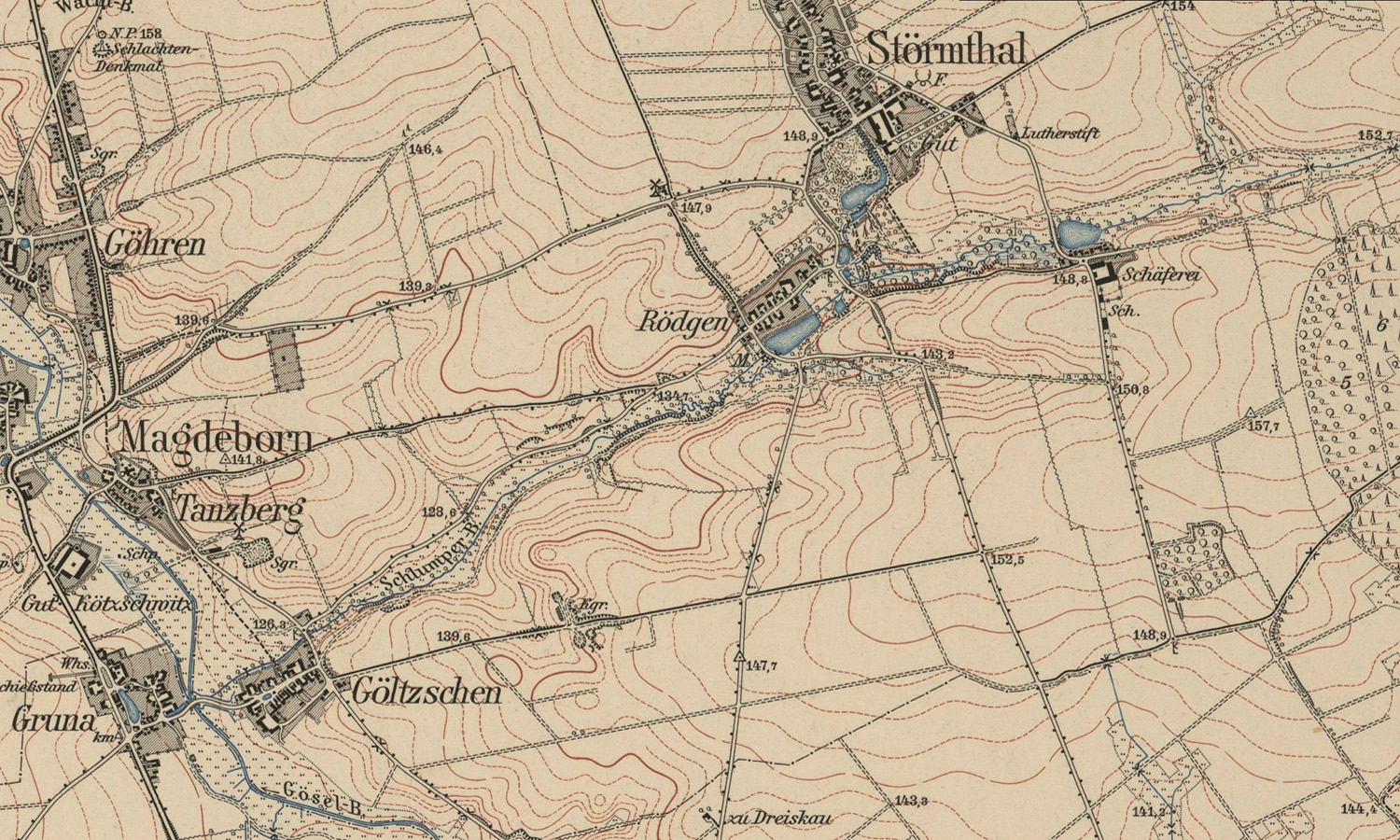

Location
- Country: Germany
- States: Saxony

The Schlumper brook (also known simply as the Schlumper) is a stream of 2.3 kilometres in length located in Saxony, Germany. It is also a tributary of the Störmthaler Lake.

== See also ==
- List of rivers of Saxony
