= Schwarze Röder =

River in Germany

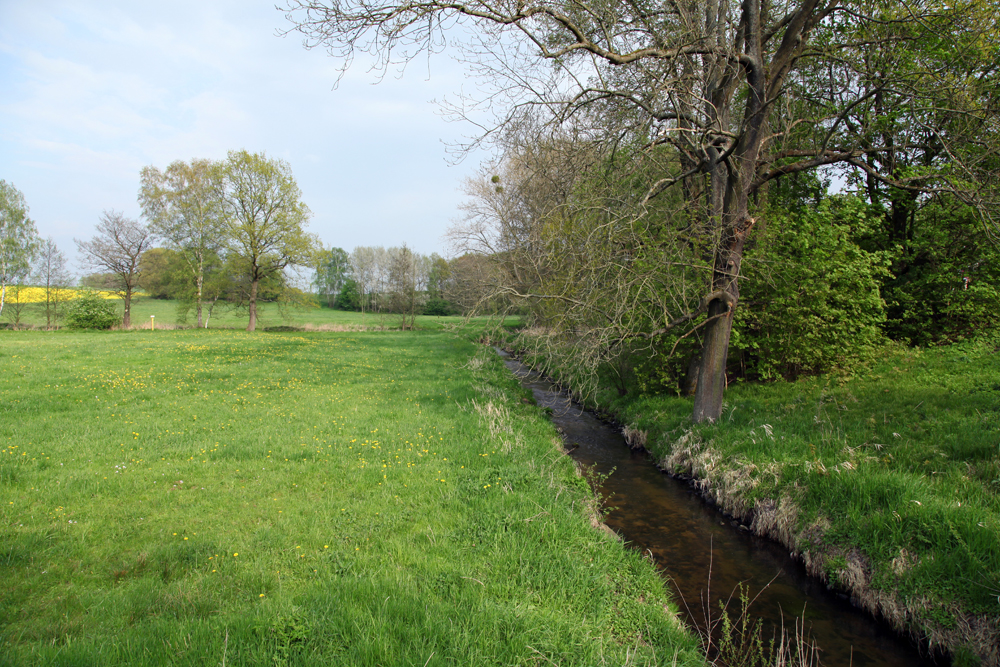

Location
- Country: Germany
- States: Saxony

Physical characteristics
- Mouth
  - location: Große Röder
  - coordinates: 51.1141°N 13.9217°E

Basin features
- Progression: Große Röder→ Black Elster→ Elbe→ North Sea

The Schwarze Röder is a river of Saxony, Germany. It is a left tributary of the Große Röder, which it joins in Radeberg.

== See also ==
- List of rivers of Saxony
