= Seltenrein =

River in Germany

Location
- Country: Germany
- State: Saxony

Physical characteristics
- Mouth
  - location: Löbauer Wasser
  - coordinates: 51.0924°N 14.6699°E

Basin features
- Progression: Löbauer Wasser→ Spree→ Havel→ Elbe→ North Sea

The Seltenrein is a small river of Saxony, Germany. It flows into the Löbauer Wasser in Löbau.

== See also ==
- List of rivers of Saxony
