= Seifenbach (Schwarzwasser) =

River in Germany

Location
- Country: Germany
- State: Saxony

Physical characteristics
- Source
  - location: at the Rabenberg
  - coordinates: 50.4457°N 12.7546°E
- Mouth
  - location: Johanngeorgenstadt
  - coordinates: 50.4479°N 12.7292°E

The Seifenbach is a river of Saxony, Germany in the area of the town Johanngeorgenstadt. It is a right tributary of the Schwarzwasser.

== See also ==
- List of rivers of Saxony
