= Oelsabach =

River of Germany

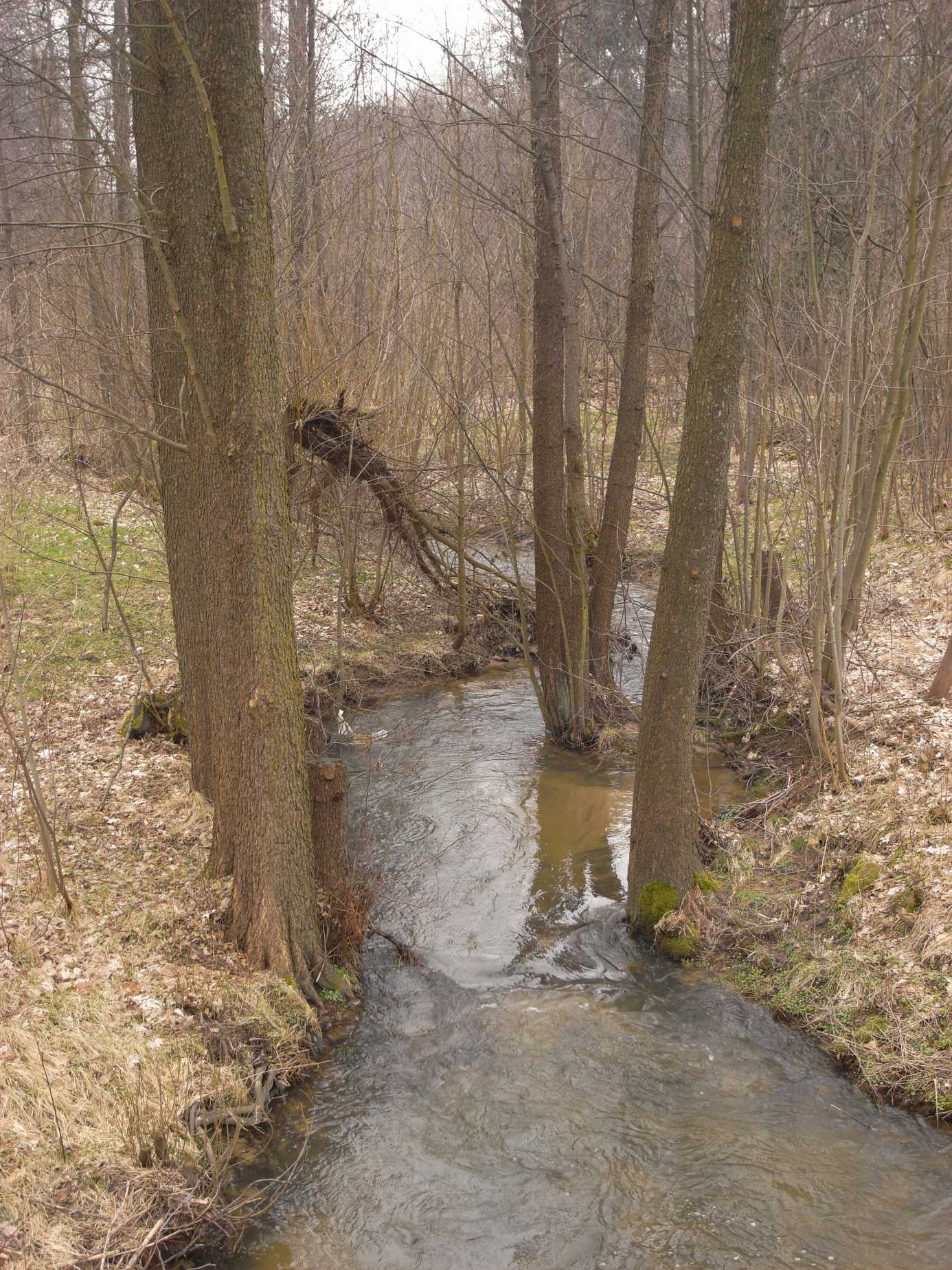

Location
- Country: Germany
- States: Saxony

Physical characteristics
- Mouth
  - location: Rote Weißeritz
  - coordinates: 50.9606°N 13.6408°E

Basin features
- Progression: Red Weißeritz→ Weißeritz→ Elbe→ North Sea

The Oelsabach is a river of Saxony, Germany. It is a right tributary of the Rote Weißeritz, which it joins in Rabenau.

== See also ==
- List of rivers of Saxony
