= Lungwitzbach =

River in Germany

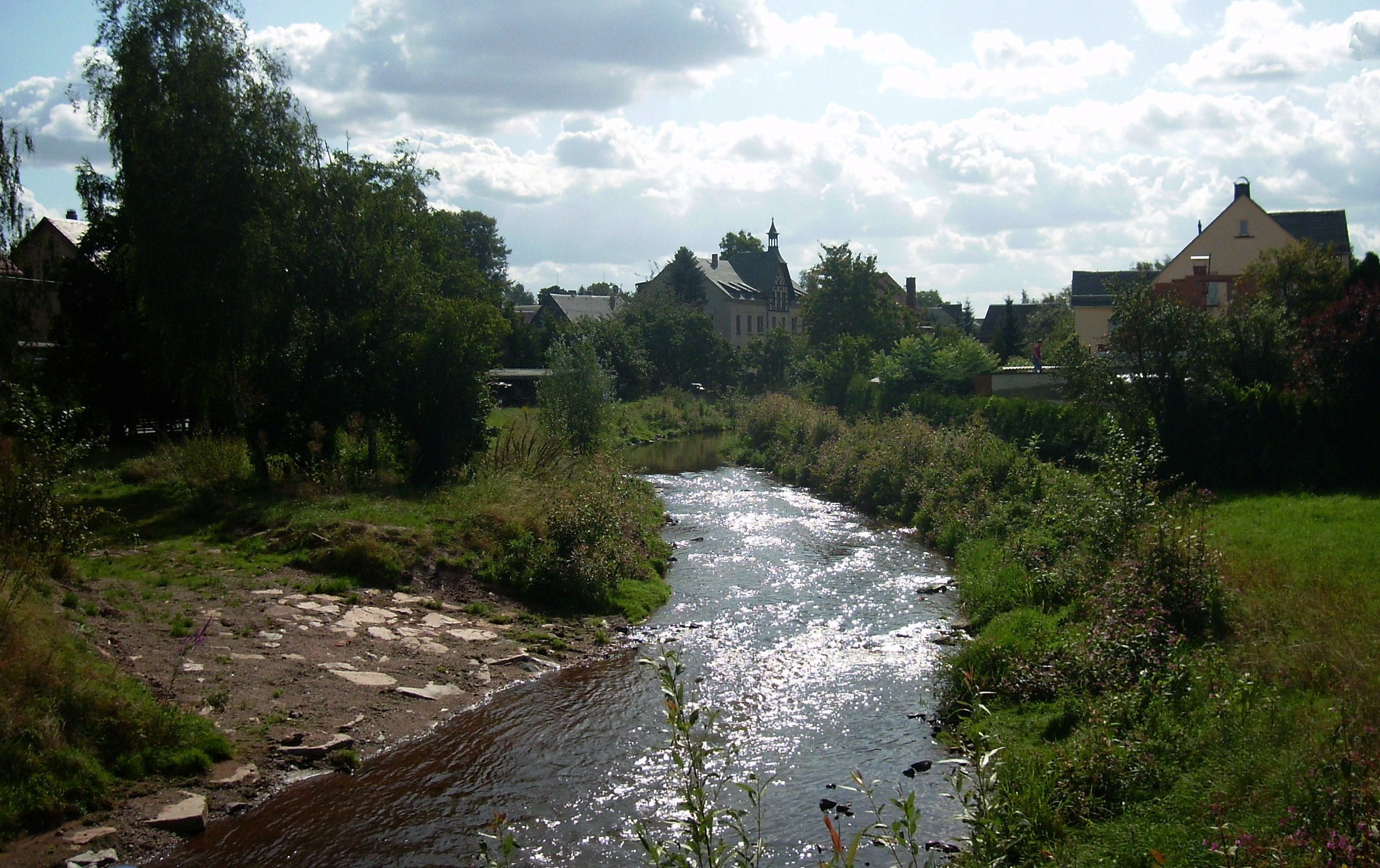

Location
- Country: Germany
- States: Saxony

Physical characteristics
- Mouth
  - location: Zwickauer Mulde
  - coordinates: 50°50′04″N 12°33′02″E

Basin features
- Progression: Zwickauer Mulde→ Mulde→ Elbe→ North Sea

The Lungwitzbach is a river of Saxony, Germany. It is a right tributary of the Zwickauer Mulde, which it joins near Glauchau.

== History ==
A hill on the right bank of the lower course of the Lungwitzbach is documented as early as 1143 as mons Crostawitze. Its exact location is uncertain, but it is regarded as one of the oldest documentary references for the area. Place-name endings such as -witz are generally taken to indicate early Slavic settlement in the region.

== Characteristics ==
With a drainage basin of about 140 square kilometres, the Lungwitzbach is among the largest watercourses in the Erzgebirge Basin. It is about 24 kilometres long and has a longitudinal drop of roughly 160 metres, about 100 metres of which occur in the upper course up to the confluence with the Hegebach. From that point onward, the Lungwitzbach is classified as a first-order watercourse and is maintained by the Saxon State Dam Administration.

== See also ==
- List of rivers of Saxony
