= Leinegraben (Leipzig) =

River in Germany

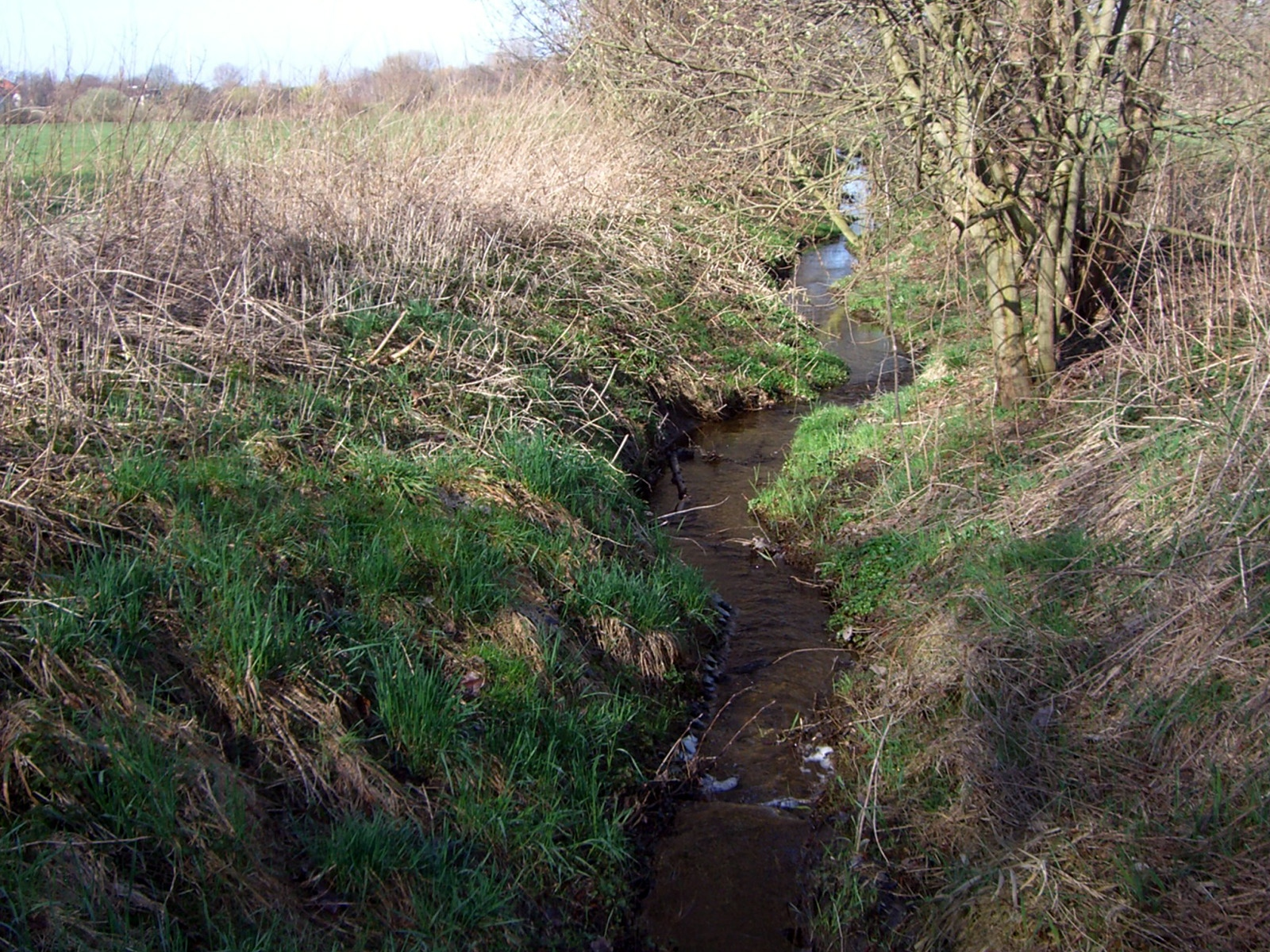

Location
- Country: Germany
- States: Saxony

Physical characteristics
- Mouth
  - location: Pleiße
  - coordinates: 51.2878°N 12.3880°E

Basin features
- Progression: Pleiße→ White Elster→ Saale→ Elbe→ North Sea

The Leinegraben is a small river in Saxony, Germany. It flows into the Pleiße near Leipzig. It is a second-order body of water.

== See also ==
- List of rivers of Saxony
