= Dahle (river) =

River in Germany

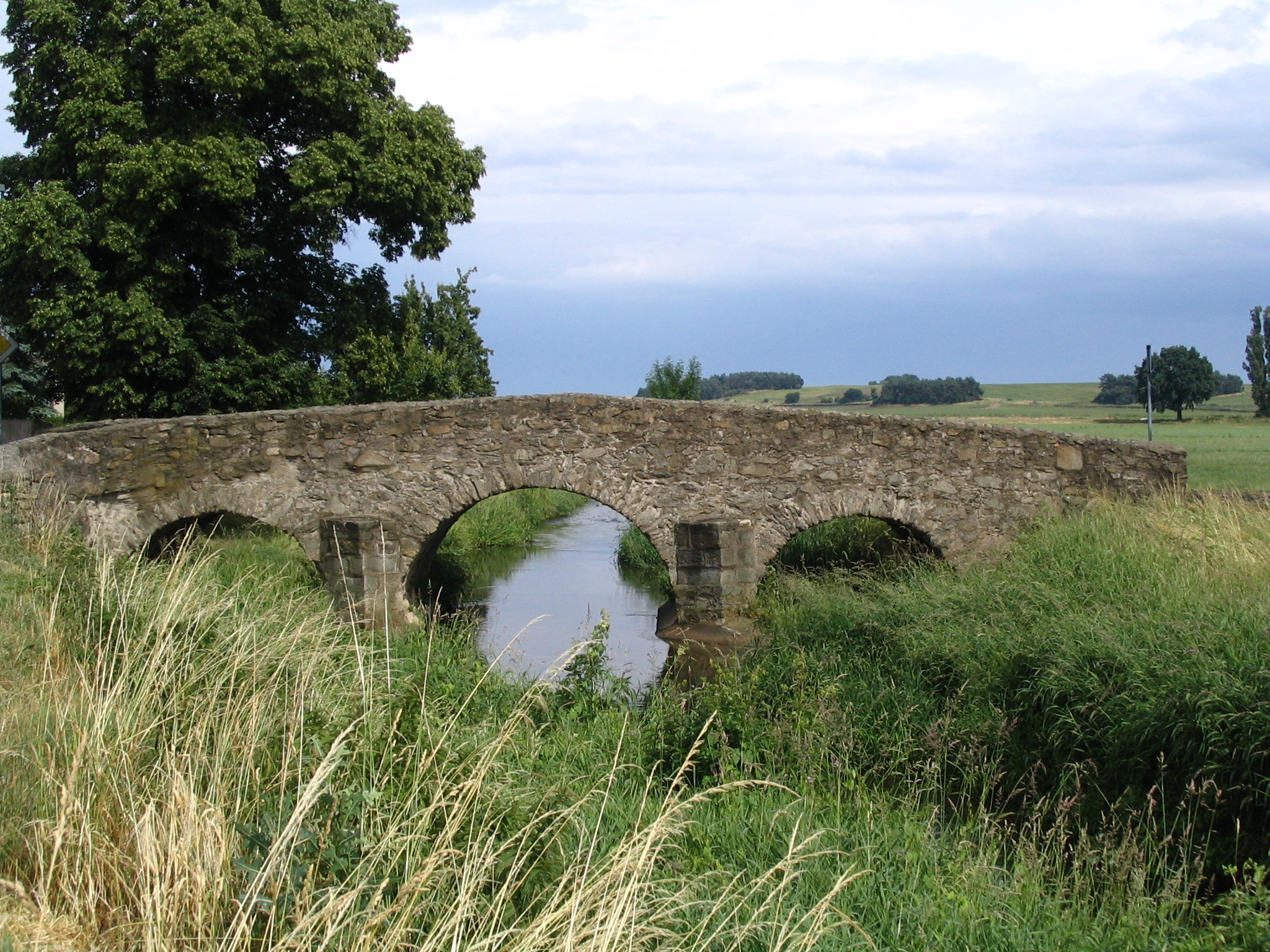

Location
- Country: Germany
- State: Saxony

Physical characteristics
- Mouth
  - location: Elbe
  - coordinates: 51°26′10″N 13°11′32″E
- Length: 24.5 km (15.2 mi)

Basin features
- Progression: Elbe→ North Sea

The Dahle is a river of Saxony, Germany. It is a left tributary of the Elbe, which it joins near Mühlberg.

== See also ==
- List of rivers of Saxony
