= Gruna (Wesenitz) =

River in Germany

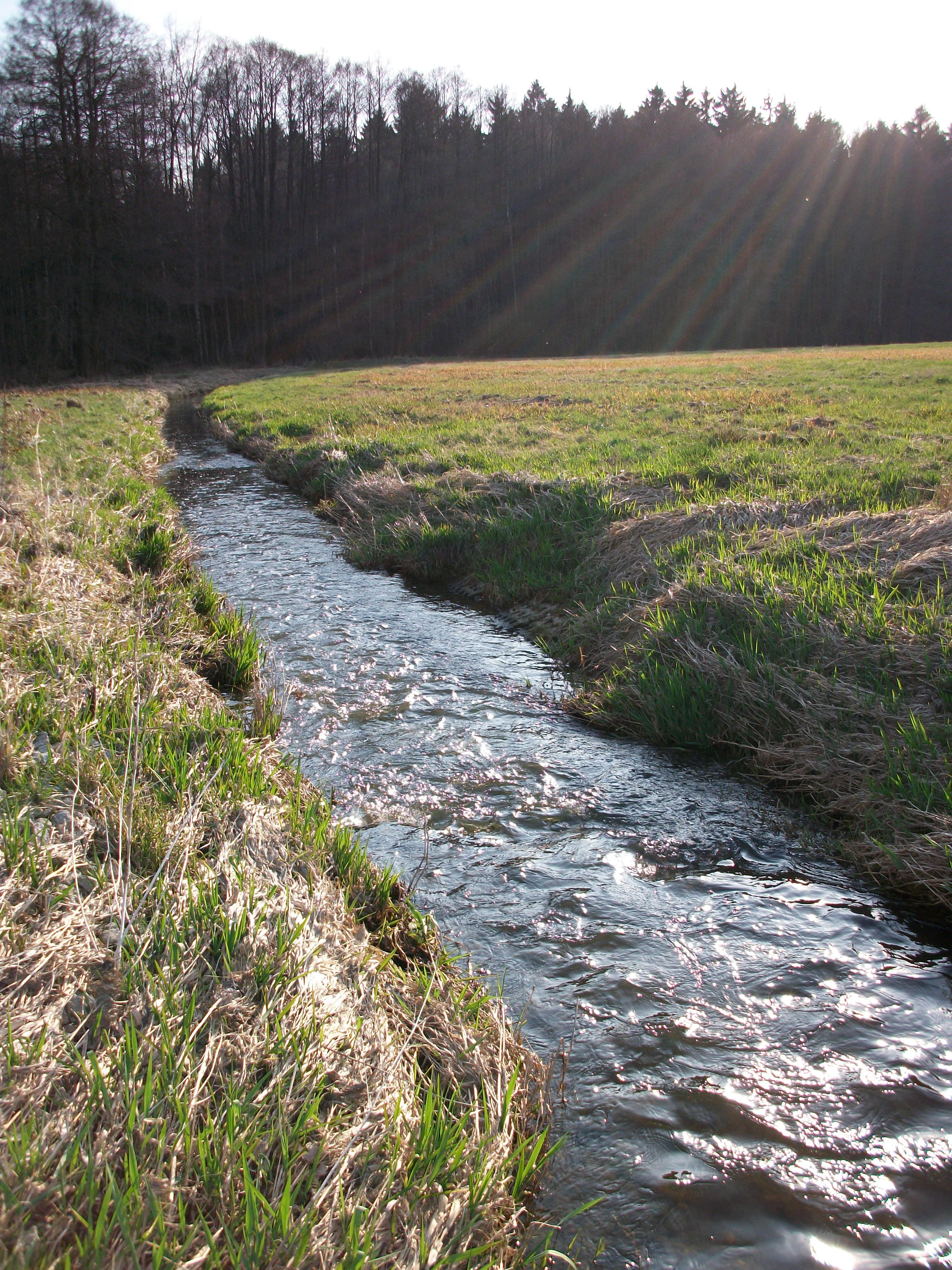

Location
- Country: Germany
- States: Saxony

Physical characteristics
- Mouth
  - location: Wesenitz
  - coordinates: 51.1049°N 14.1046°E

Basin features
- Progression: Wesenitz→ Elbe→ North Sea

The Gruna is a small river of Saxony, Germany. It is a right tributary of the Wesenitz, which it joins in Großharthau.

== See also ==
- List of rivers of Saxony
