= Kleine Spree =

River in Germany

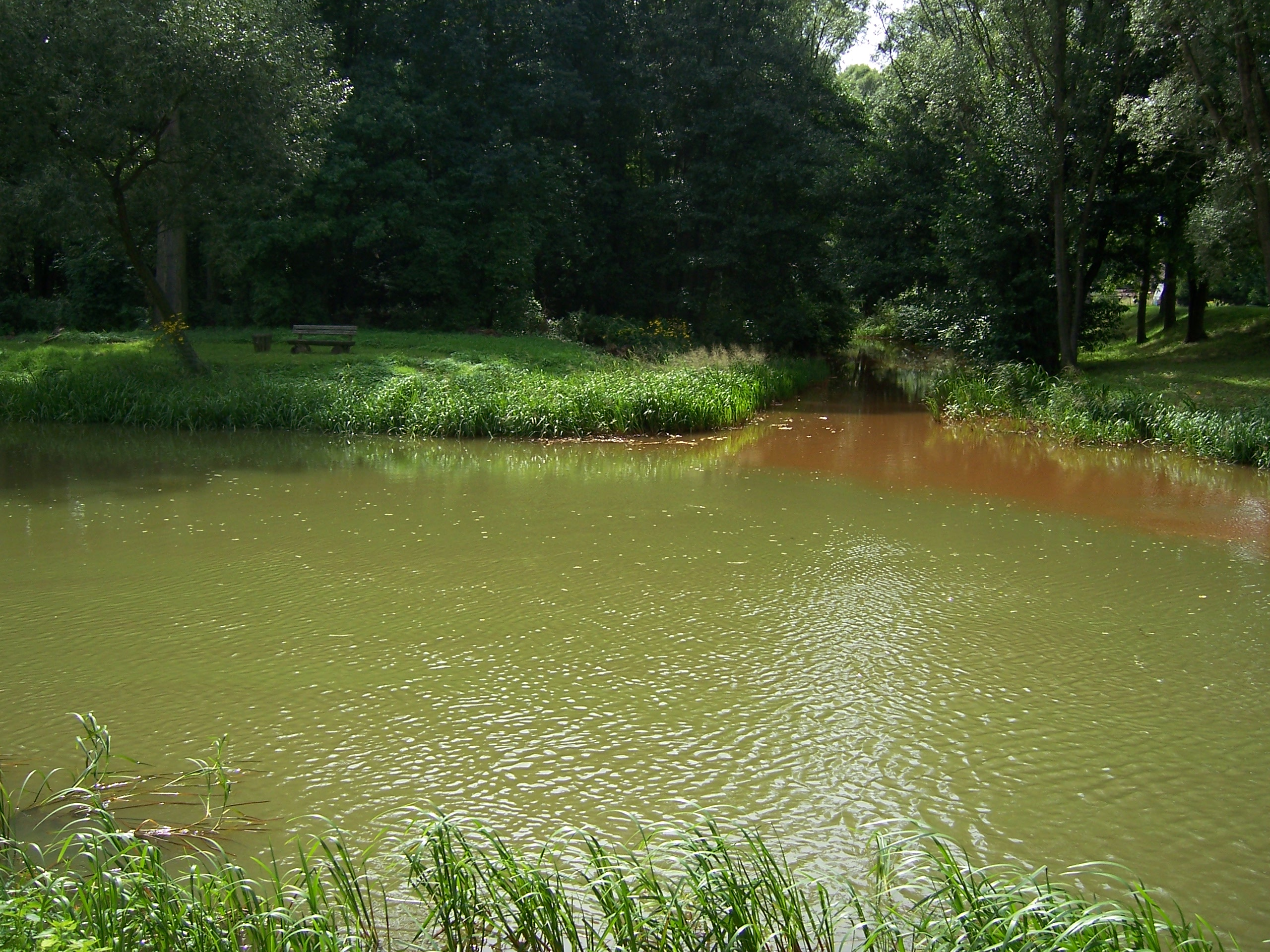

Location
- Country: Germany
- States: Saxony

Physical characteristics
- Source
  - location: Spree
  - coordinates: 51.2706°N 14.5344°E
- Mouth
  - location: Spree
  - coordinates: 51.5094°N 14.4042°E

Basin features
- Progression: Spree→ Havel→ Elbe→ North Sea

The Kleine Spree is a river of Saxony, Germany. It is a left branch of the Spree, from which it splits near Großdubrau and which it joins near Spreewitz.
