= Landgraben (Dresden) =

River in Germany

Coordinates: 51.04636°N 13.81462°E

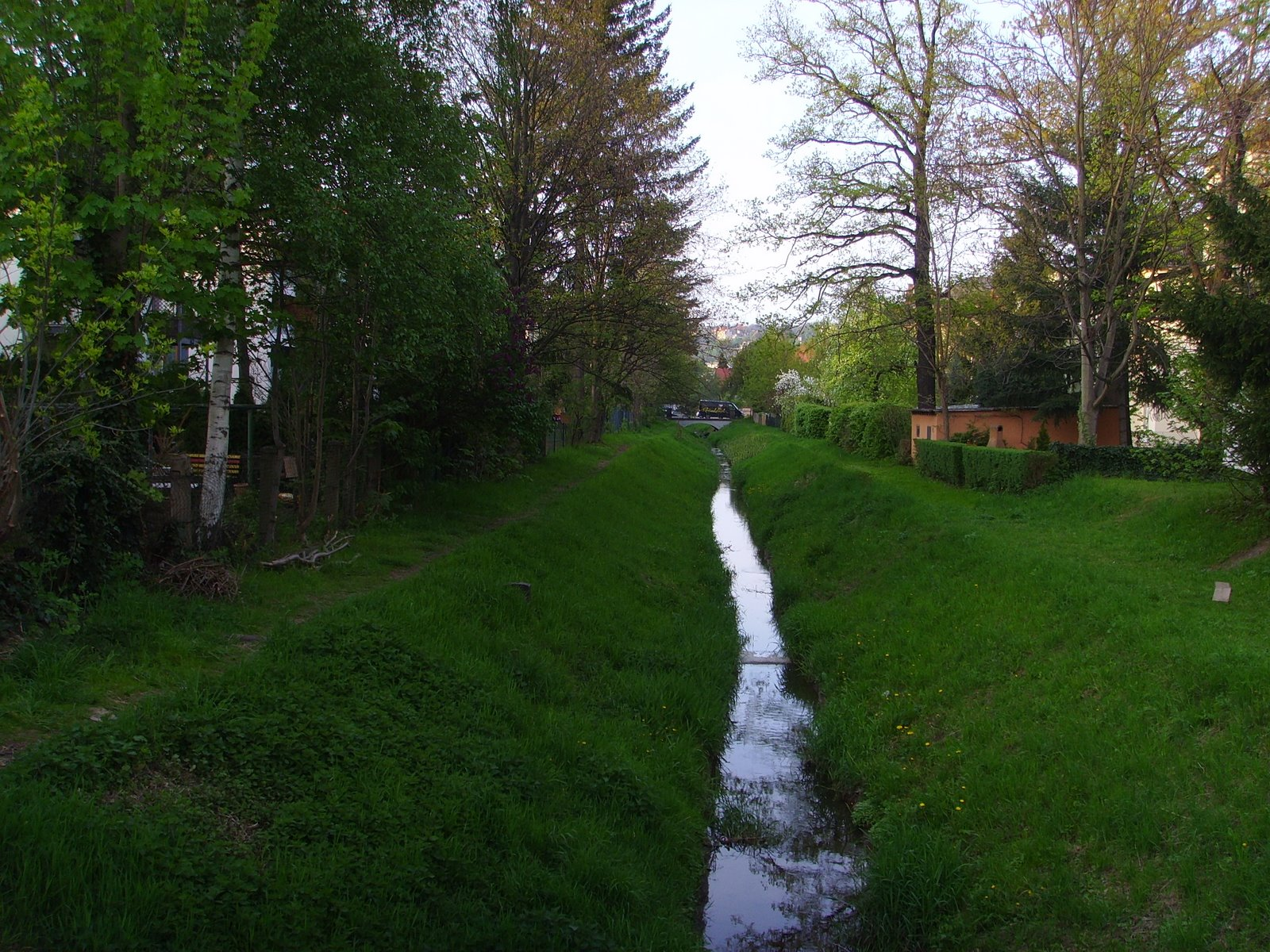

Location
- Country: Germany
- States: Saxony

Basin features
- Progression: Elbe→ North Sea

The Landgraben is a small river of Saxony, Germany. It flows into the Elbe in Dresden.

== See also ==
- List of rivers of Saxony
