= Lößnitzbach =

River in Germany

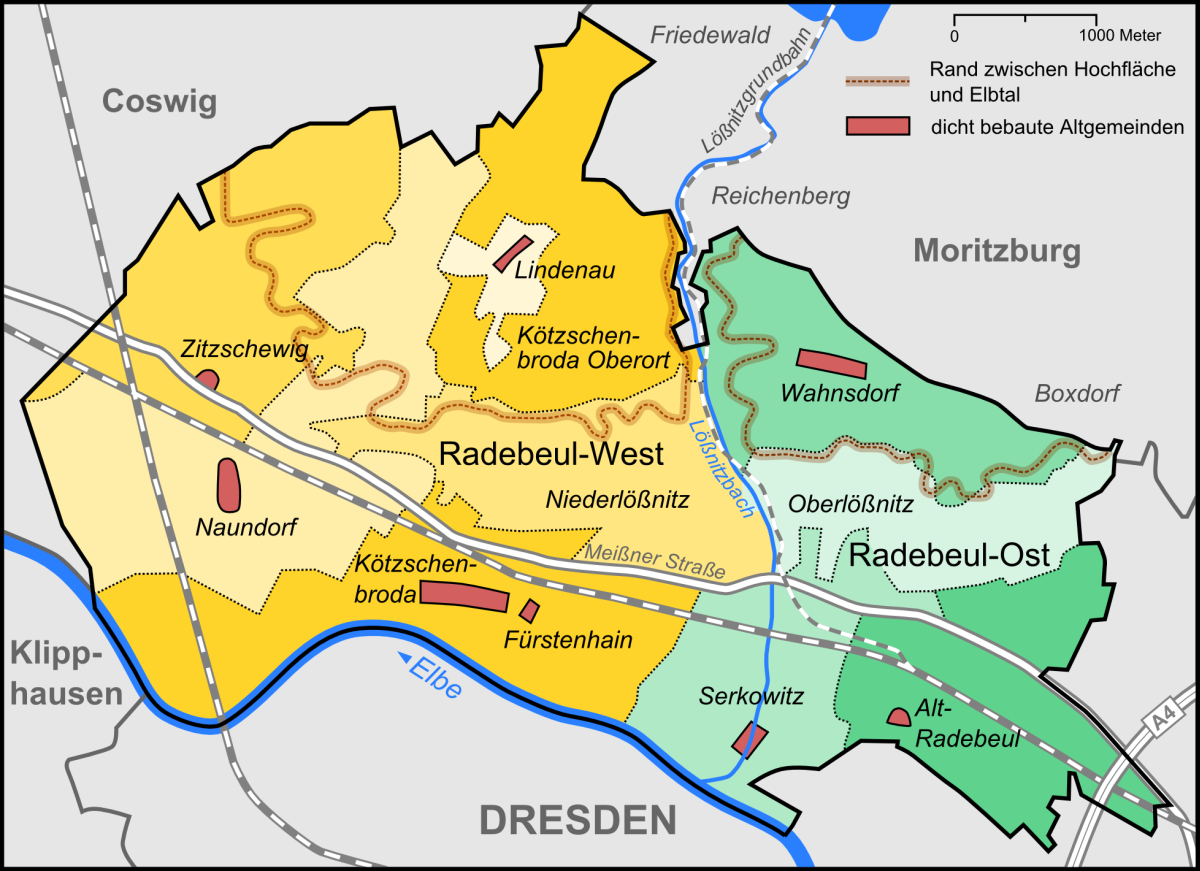

Location
- Country: Germany
- States: Saxony

Physical characteristics
- Mouth
  - location: Elbe
  - coordinates: 51.0938°N 13.6529°E

Basin features
- Progression: Elbe→ North Sea

The Lößnitzbach (formerly also as Zodenbach or Zottelbach) is a right-bank small tributary(river) of the Elbe in Saxony, Germany, which it joins in Radebeul.

The river flows in the Saxon cities of Moritzburg and Radebeul. The name, possibly derived from the Old Sorbian lěsnica (forest stream), is believed to

firbe st mentioned in 1,286 in the Kötzschenbroda wine-growing region .

In the dry season, the amount of water downstream decreases significantly. The stream is particularly dry in summer months (especially near Radebeul) because the water in the Elbsander slowly seeps away, meaning the stream does not reach its mouth into the Elbe during dry periods.

== See also ==
- List of rivers of Saxony
