= Nove Mesto =

Nove Mesto, meaning "New Town" in Czech and Slovak, may refer to:

- Nové Město (disambiguation), places in the Czech Republic
- Nové Mesto (disambiguation), places in Slovakia and Hungary
