= Pöbel Valley railway =

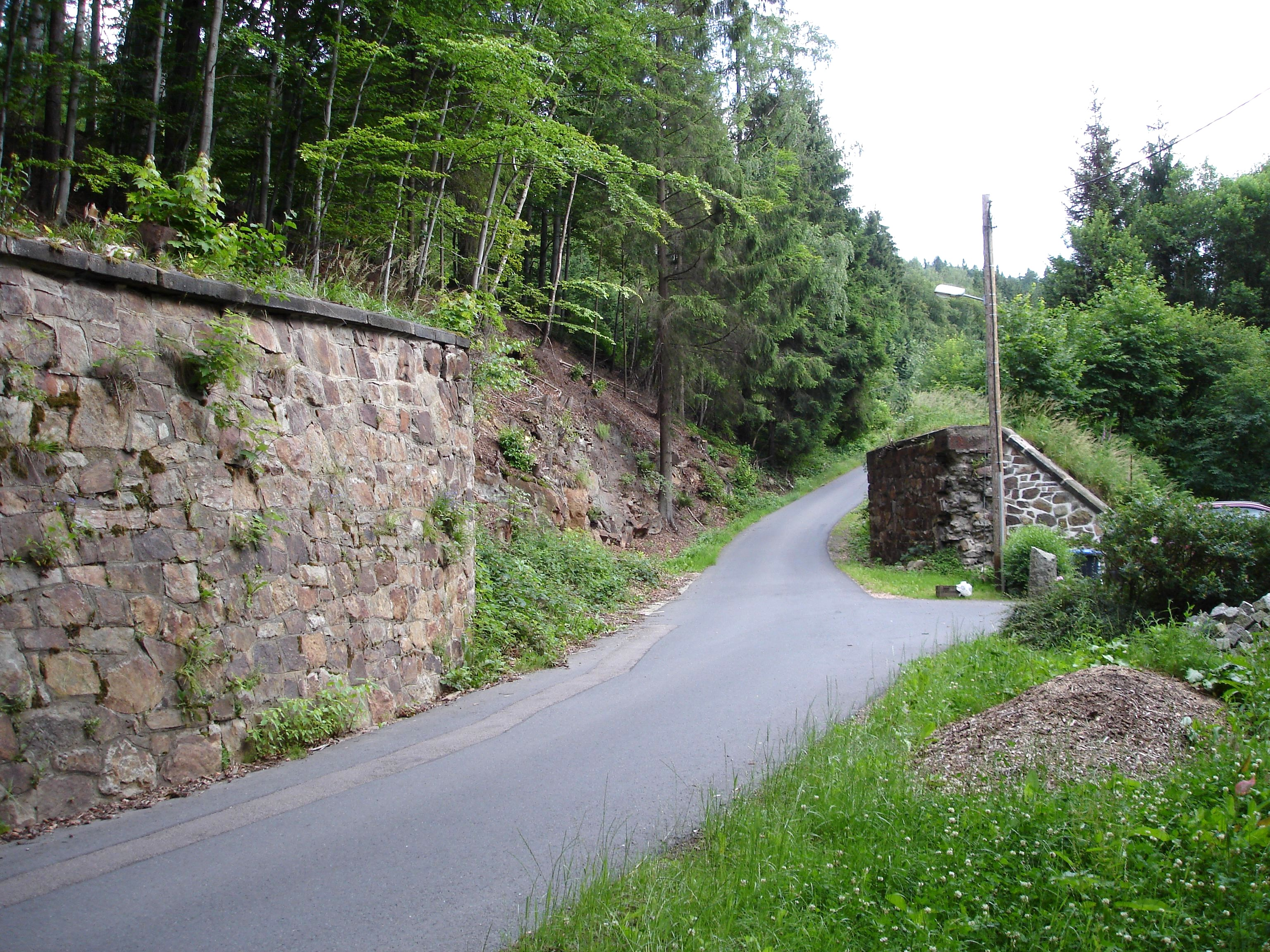
Unfinished bridge over Alte Böhmische Straße (2007)

The Pöbel Valley railway (German: Pöbeltalbahn) was a 750 mm (2 ft 5 1/2 in) narrow-gauge railway project intended to link Saxon Schmiedeberg on the Weisseritz Valley Railway (Weißeritztalbahn) with Moldava on the 1,435 mm (4 ft 8 1/2 in) standard gauge Most–Moldava railway. The railway, climbing through the Pöbel Valley (Pöbeltal) to the ridge of the Ore Mountains, was expected to transport lignite from the Most Basin.

Construction began on 10 March 1920. The railway station at Schmiedeberg was realigned and enlarged, however the additional railway tracks were not laid. By 1921 the intended trackbed had been marked out for 9.16 kilometres (5.69 mi). On 14 November 1923 its construction was abandoned. By that stage the line had been completed as far as the railway station of Niederpöbel and several other track sections were under construction. Some sections are still recognizable today, especially the one from Schmiedeberg to Niederpöbel and the track around the planned halt of Wahlsmühle.
