= Pöbelbach =

River of Germany

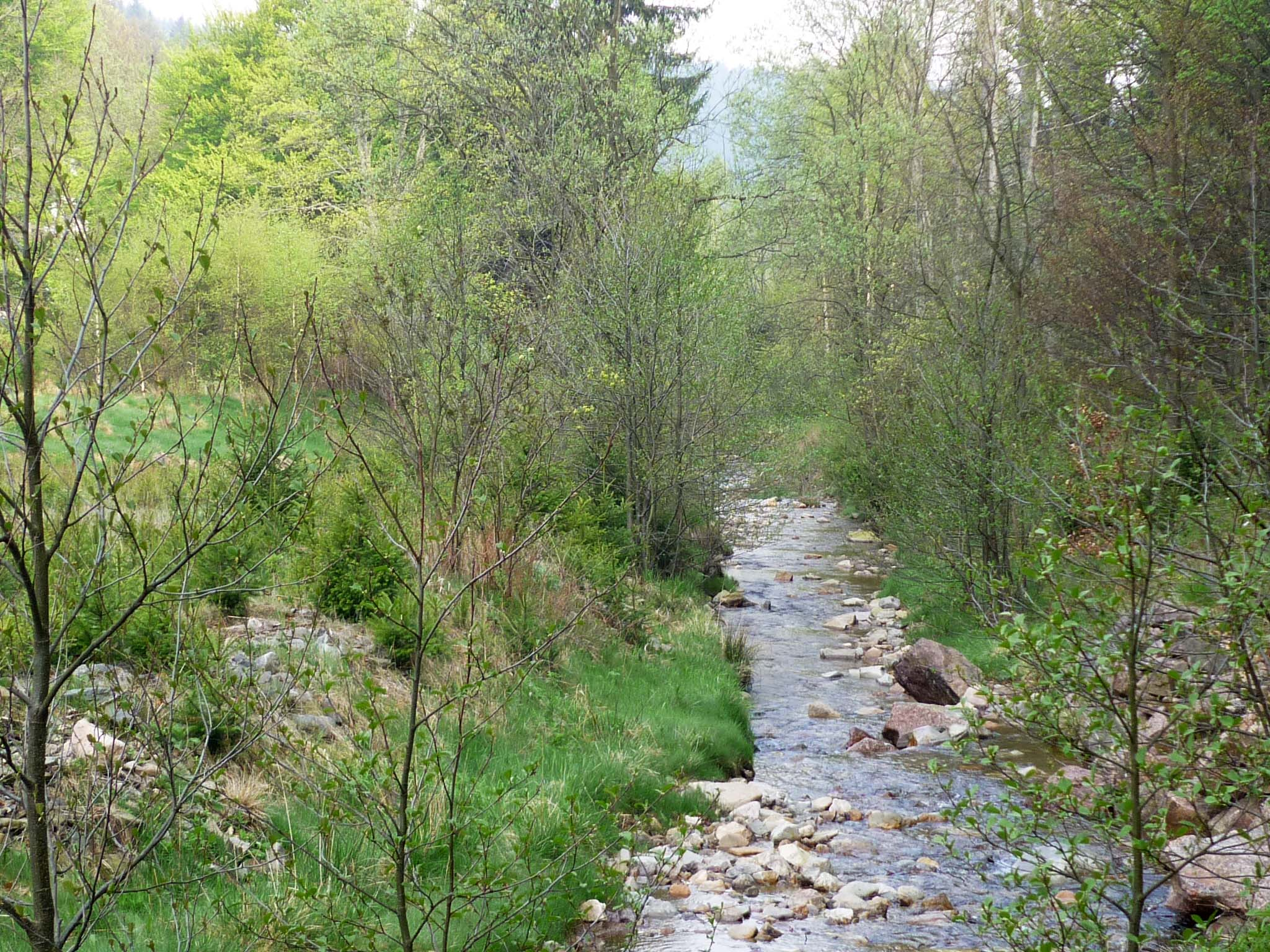

Location
- Country: Germany
- States: Saxony

Physical characteristics
- Mouth
  - location: Red Weißeritz
  - coordinates: 50°50′12″N 13°40′33″E

Basin features
- Progression: Red Weißeritz→ Weißeritz→ Elbe→ North Sea

The Pöbelbach is a left tributary of the Weißeritz. It is located in the district of Saxon Switzerland-Eastern Ore Mountains, Saxony. The river flows into the Red Weißeritz in Schmiedeberg.

== Course ==
The Pöbelbach originates in a moorland forest area between Pöbelknochen (833 m) and the western slope of the Kahleberg on the municipal territory of Altenberg. A part of its source water is diverted into the Neugraben, a source stream of the Red Weißeritz.

The upper course of the stream has deeply carved into the contact zone between Erzgebirgsgneiss and Schellerhauer granite, creating a steep-walled valley. In its further course, the Pöbelbach forms the Pöbeltal, where, in the early 20th century, the Pöbeltal Railway was planned. The stream flows from the left into the Red Weißeritz at Schmiedeberg. From the locality of Oberpöbel, a road (S 183) runs downstream to Schmiedeberg.

== Name ==
The origin of the name is difficult to interpret. It is assumed that it is derived from a Slavic place name and refers to the word “popel” (Czech for "ash"), which may be connected to a former potash production process that involved burning wood.

The Pöbelbach is the namesake for the Dippoldiswalde districts of Oberpöbel and Niederpöbel, as well as the mountain Pöbelknochen in the stream's source area. Former mills in the Pöbelbach valley were the Putzmühle and Schichtmühle in Oberpöbel.

== Flood control reservoir Niederpöbel ==
In April 2020, after nine years of construction, the Niederpöbel flood control reservoir was completed. It has a height of 28 meters above the valley floor and a total storage capacity of 1.2 million cubic meters. The Pöbelbach is not permanently impounded in the retention basin, and the stream passes under the dam through a 65-meter-long tunnel.

== See also ==
- List of rivers of Saxony
