= DHG (disambiguation) =

DHG may refer to:

- Dødheimsgard, a Norwegian black metal band
- Domain Group, the ASX code DHG
- Dixon Hughes Goodman, one of the two predecessor firms that merged to form Forvis, LLP
- Denihan Hospitality Group, a family-owned American hotel and hotel management company
- Dalata Hotel Group, the Euronext Dublin code DHG
- Freital-Hainsberg station, the DS100 code DHG
- dhg, the ISO 639-3 code for Dhangu-Djangu language
