= Weisseritz Valley Railway =

Railway line in Germany

Weißeritz Valley Railway

Overview
- Native name: Weißeritztalbahn
- Line number: 6966
- Locale: Saxony, Germany

Service
- Route number: 513

Technical
- Line length: 26.335 km (16.364 mi)
- Track gauge: 750 mm (2 ft 5 1/2 in)
- Minimum radius: 50 m (164 ft)
- Operating speed: 30 km/h (18.6 mph) (maximum)
- Maximum incline: 3.47%

The Weißeritz Valley Railway (German: Weißeritztalbahn) is a steam operated narrow gauge railway in Saxony, Germany. The line connects Freital, near Dresden, with the spa of Kipsdorf in the Ore Mountains, and follows the valley of the Red Weißeritz.

The line was the second Saxon narrow gauge railway to be built, and is also considered to be the oldest public narrow gauge railway in Germany still in operation.

Since 14 September 2004, the line has been operated by Saxon Steam Railway Company (formerly the BVO Bahn), a company that also operates the Fichtelberg Railway and Lößnitzgrund Railway.

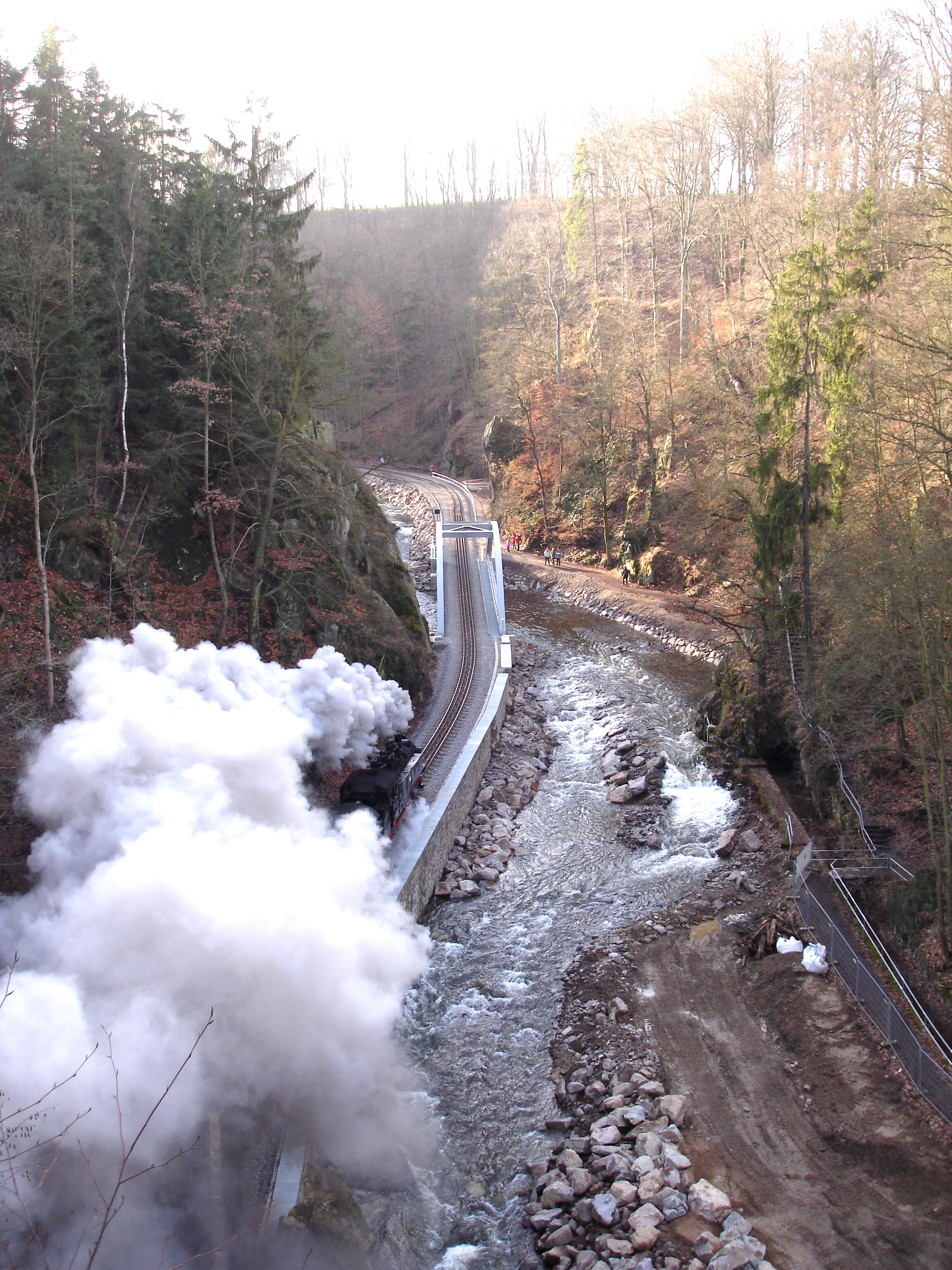
Train on reconstructed section in Rabenau

== History ==
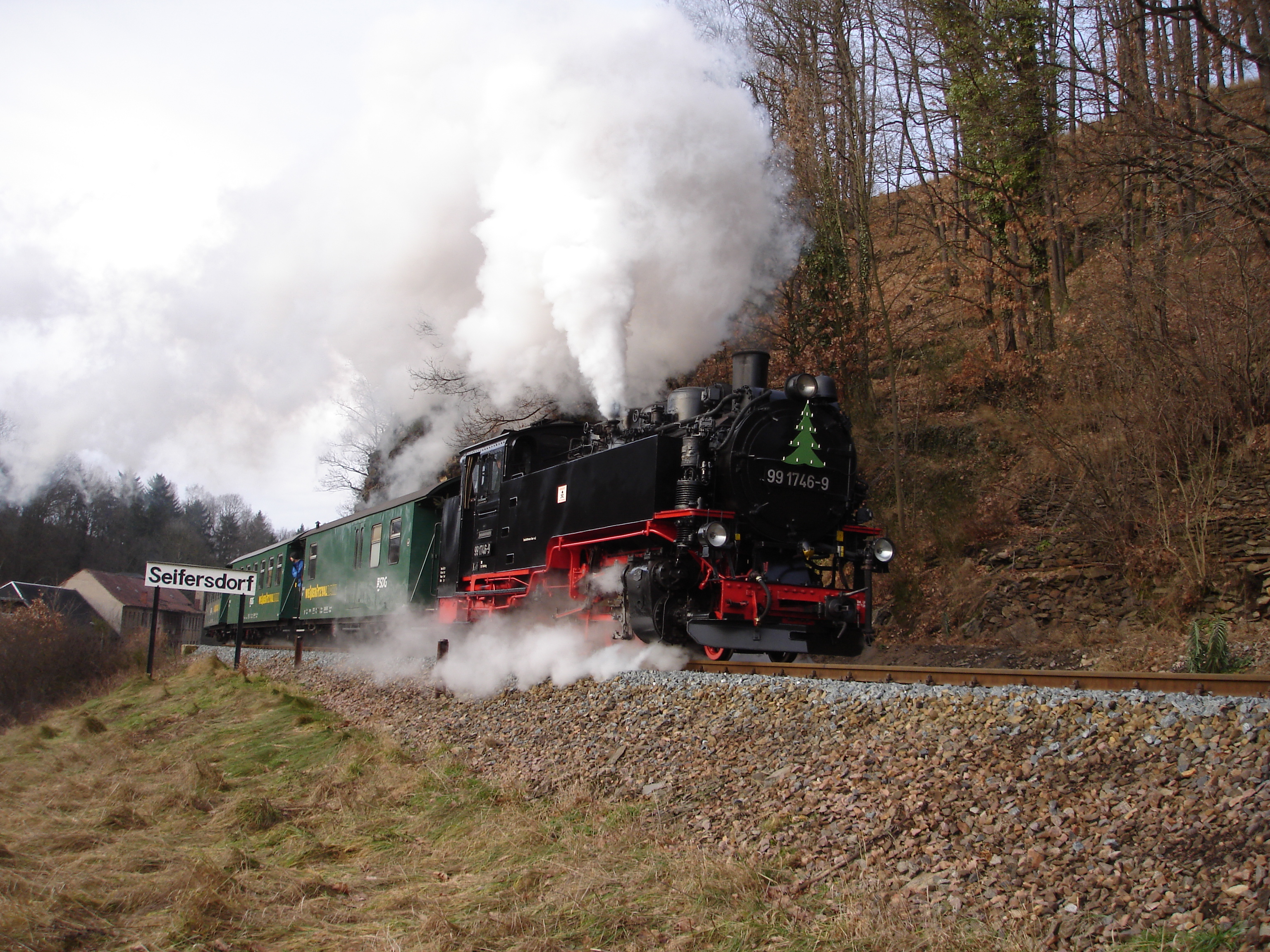
Train in Seifersdorf

The construction started in 1881. The gauge selected for the line was 750 mm (2 ft 5 1/2 in), in common with other Saxon narrow gauge railways. The first section to Schmiedeberg was put into operation on 1 November 1882. On 3 September 1883, the regular trains reached the terminal station at Kurort Kipsdorf.

In 1912 a part of the track was relocated to allow construction of the Malter Valley Dam. In 1920 construction began on the Pöbel Valley Railway (Pöbeltalbahn) that was to link Schmiedelberg, on the Weißeritz Valley Railway, to Moldava, now in the Czech Republic. This line was expected to bring additional freight traffic, but construction was abandoned in 1923 and never resumed.

Freight traffic ceased on the line in 1993, leaving only passenger traffic. By the time of the floods in 2002, the railway carried approximately 200,000 passengers per year.

== Damage in 2002 floods ==
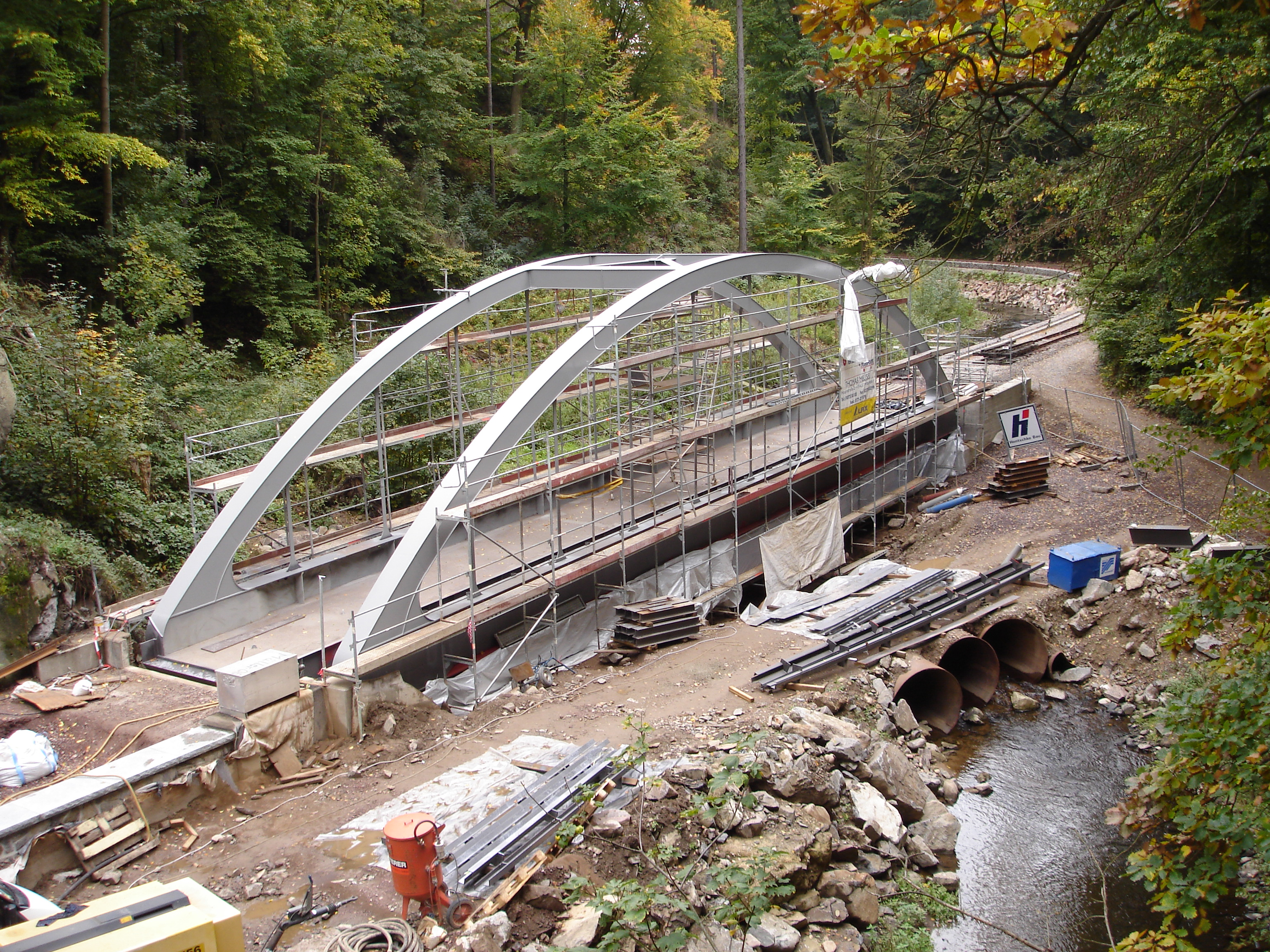
A bridge under reconstruction in Rabenau

The railway was badly hit by the major flooding in 2002, which severely damaged most of the track and infrastructure. This damage mirrored that of 1897, when almost all the line's bridges were damaged or destroyed.

The damage was estimated to be around €20 million and a fund-raising campaign was organised. The Federal government and the Government of Saxony agreed to cover one half of what is needed to rebuild the railway line. The section of line between Freital-Hainsberg station and Dippoldiswalde, the normal passing point for trains, was reopened on 14 December 2008. Six return trains per day are normally operated on this section.

The section of line from Dippoldiswalde to the terminus at Kurort Kipsdorf was due to reopen in 2010, however reconstruction was halted whilst the cost of rebuilding the first section to reopen is investigated. The rebuilding was originally expected to cost €19 million, but as of 2010 had cost €22.5 million. As this increase has coincided with budgetary cutbacks for the Saxon narrow gauge lines, new sources of funding had to be found if the rebuilding were to be completed.

Funding was secured, and work on rebuilding the remainder of the line resumed in 2014; the remaining section from Dippoldiswalde to Kurort Kipsdorf reopened on 17 July 2017.

== 2024 accident ==
On 19 August 2024, locomotive 99 1762-6 was derailed and damaged by an accident with a truck on a level crossing near Dippoldiswalde station.

== Technical specification ==
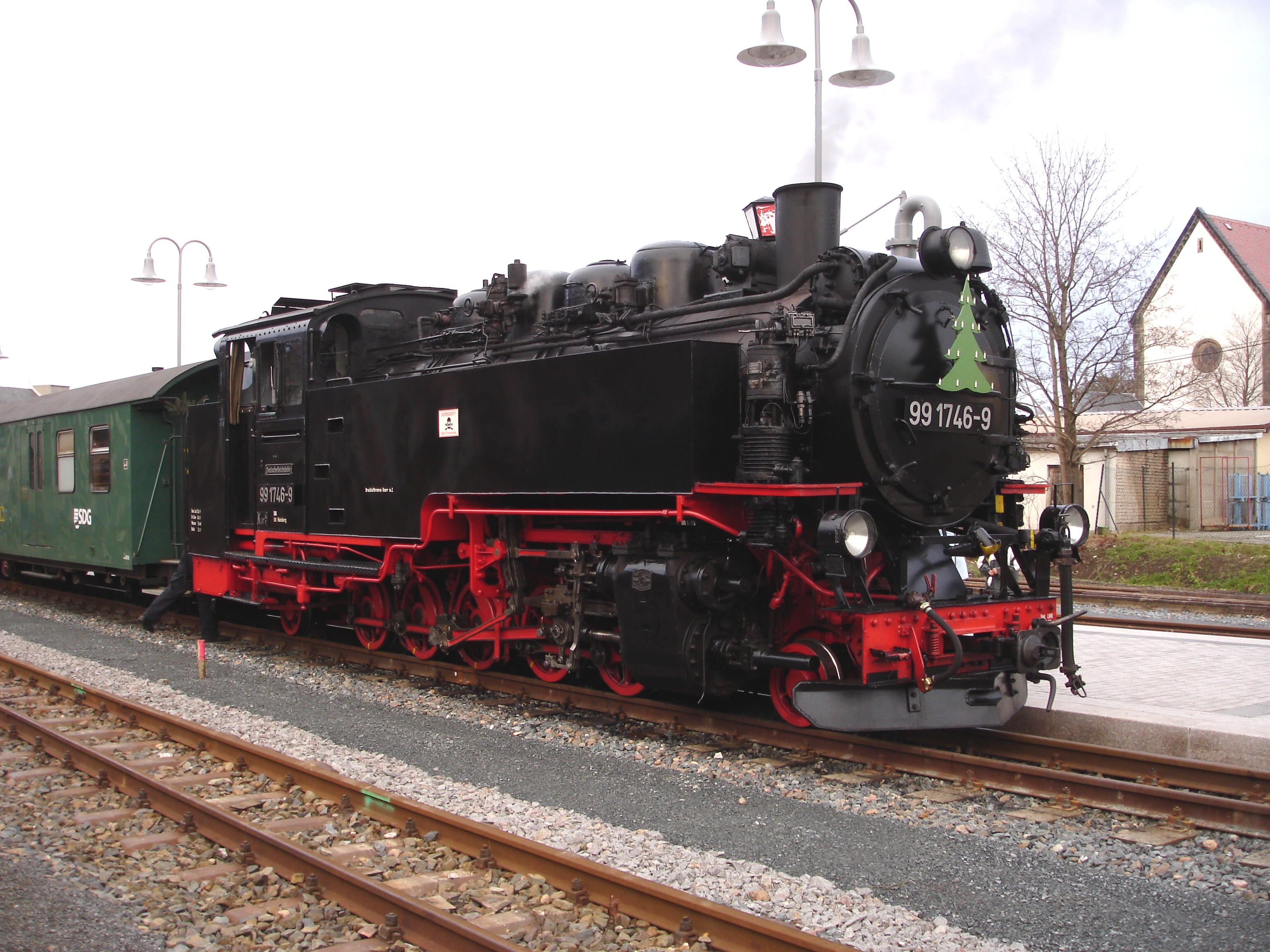
Locomotive 99 1746

- Gauge: 750 mm (2 ft 5 1/2 in)
- Length: 26.3 kilometres (16.3 mi)
- Elevation difference: 350 metres (1,150 ft)
- Min. curve-radius: 50 metres (160 ft)
- Max. gradient: 1:40
- Stations/Stops: 13
- Bridges: 34

== The route ==
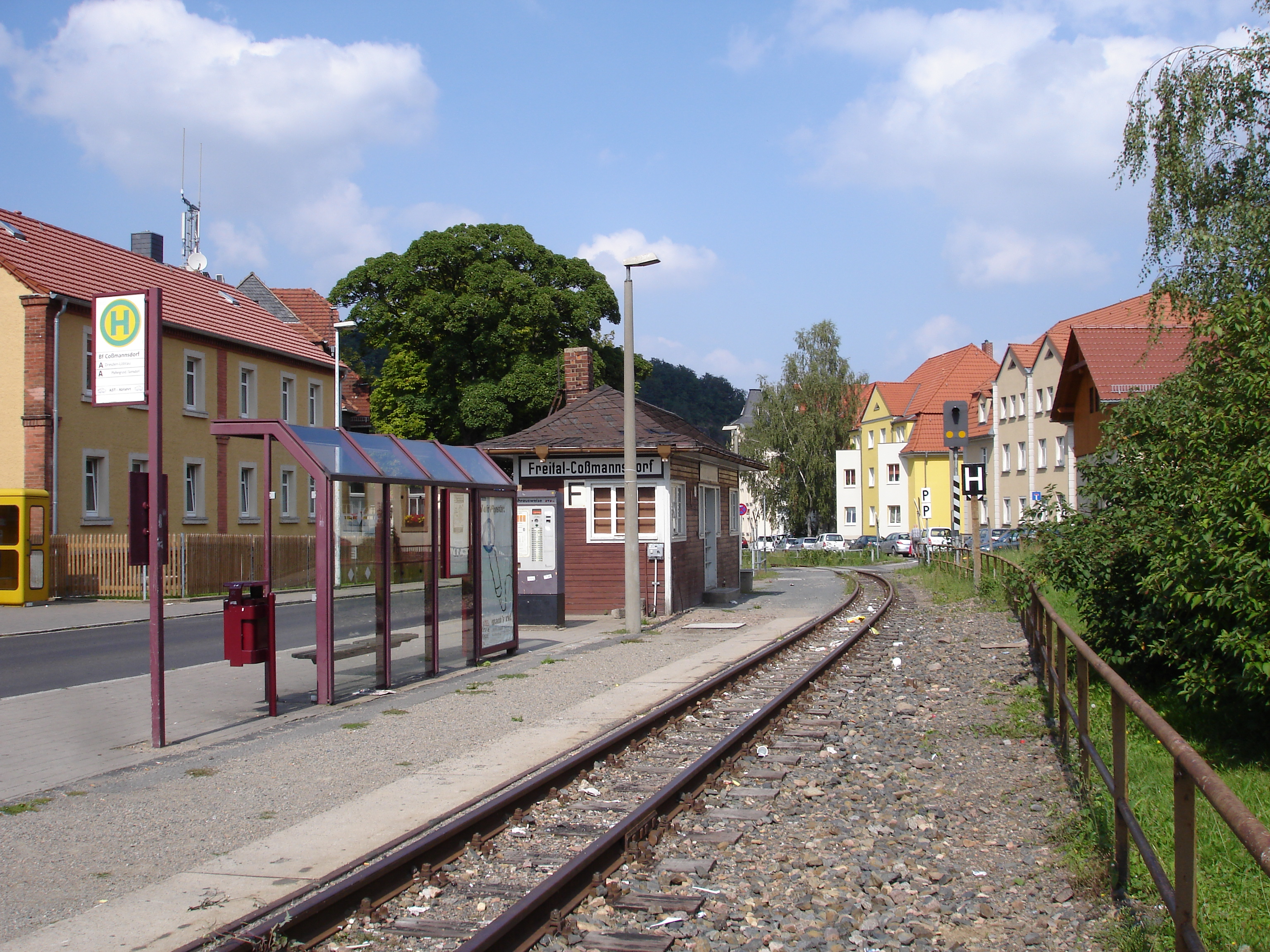
Station at Freital Cossmannsdorf

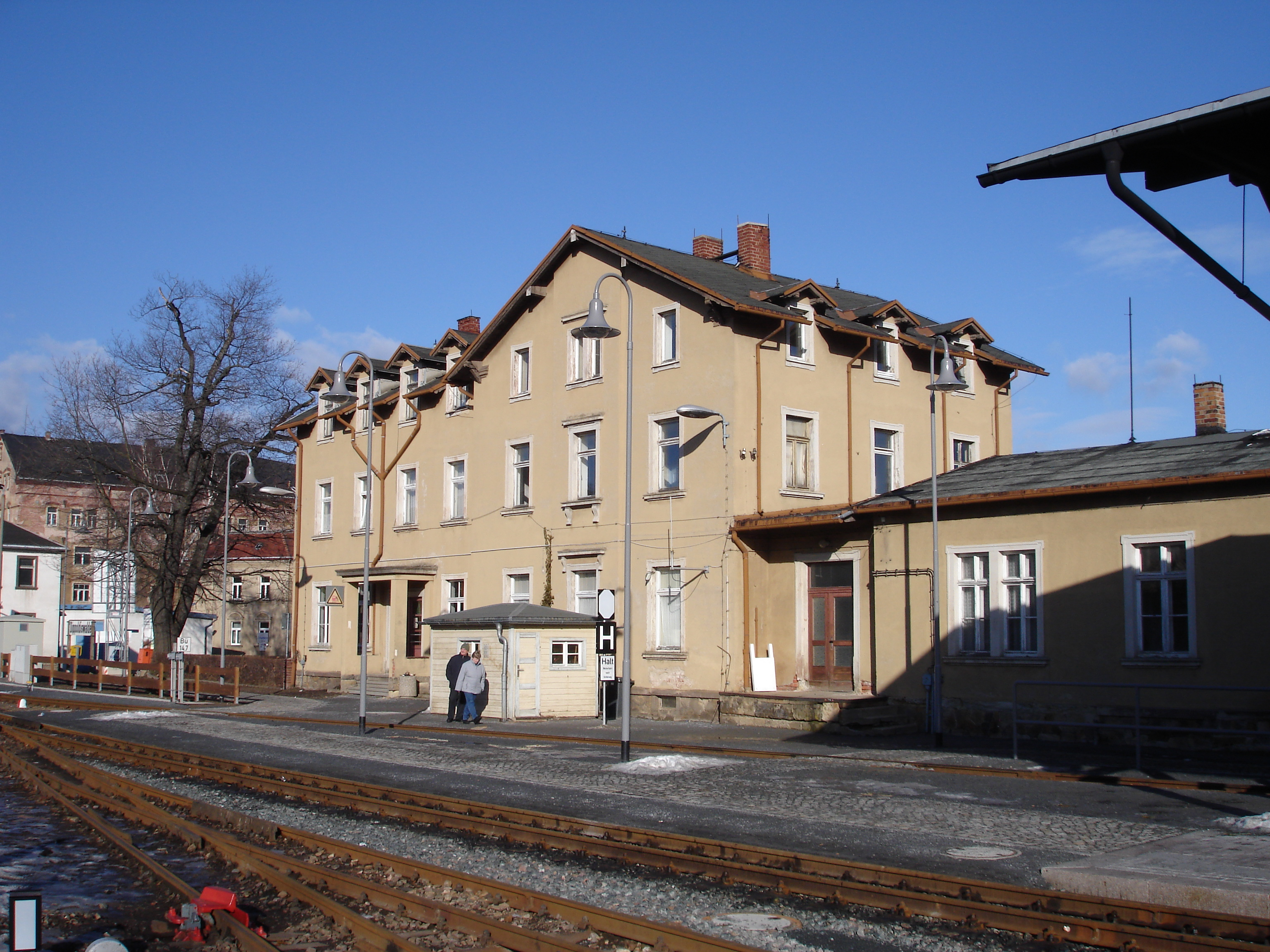
Station at Dippoldiswalde

The track begins at Freital-Hainsberg station on the standard gauge railway from Dresden to Chemnitz, and at an altitude of 184 m (604 ft).

The other stations and stops are as follows:

- Freital Cossmannsdorf; 1.6 km (0.99 mi); 192 m (630 ft)
- Rabenau; 5.3 km (3.3 mi); 249 m (817 ft)
- Spechtritz; 6.7 km (4.2 mi); 274 m (899 ft)
- Seifersdorf; 8.7 km (5.4 mi); 301 m (988 ft)
- Malter; 10.8 km (6.7 mi); 335 m (1,099 ft); by Malter dam
- Dippoldiswalde; 14.8 km (9.2 mi); 343 m (1,125 ft)
- Ulberndorf; 17.3 km (10.7 mi); 374 m (1,227 ft)
- Obercarsdorf; 18.8 km (11.7 mi); 390 m (1,280 ft)
- Schmiedeberg-Naundorf; 20.7 km (12.9 mi); 410 m (1,350 ft)
- Schmiedeberg; 22.1 km (13.7 mi); 441 m (1,447 ft)
- Buschmühle; 23.3 km (14.5 mi); 463 m (1,519 ft)
- Kurort Kipsdorf; 26.1 km (16.2 mi); 533 m (1,749 ft)

== Bibliography ==
- Thiel, Hans-Christoph (1996). Schmalspurbahn Freital-Hainsberg – Kipsdorf. Verlag Kenning Nordhorn. ISBN 3-927587-67-2.
