= Mikulov (Teplice District) =

- Municipality
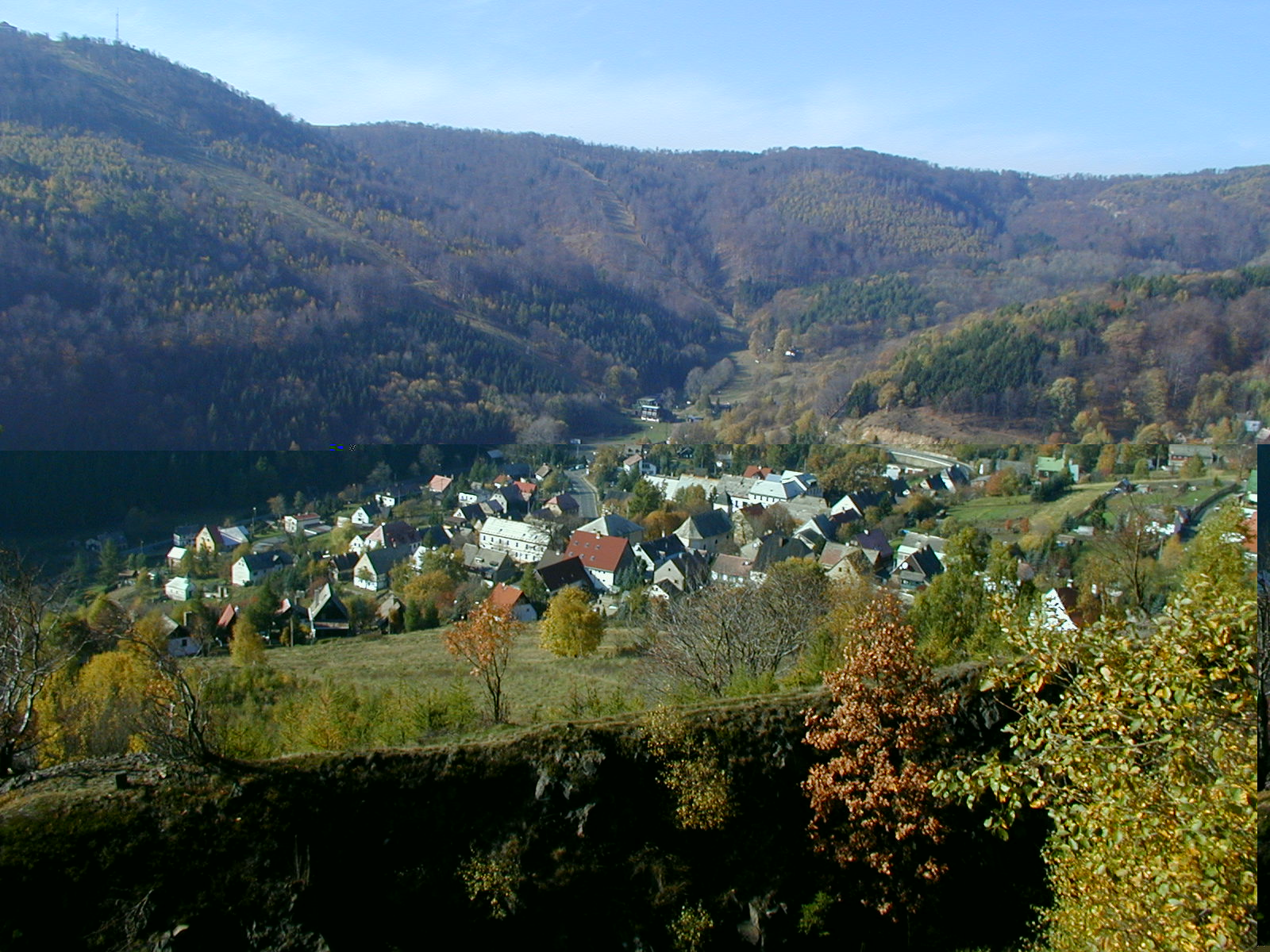
- Mikulov seen from the Bouřňák hill

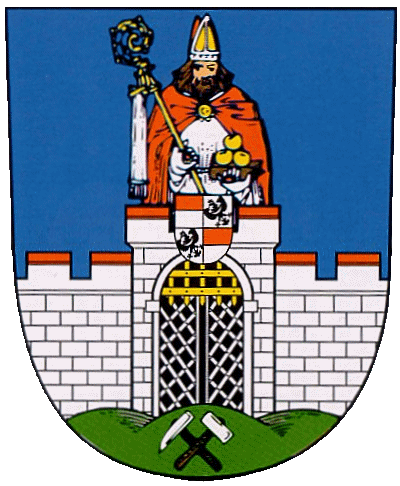
- Coat of arms

- Location in the Czech Republic
- Coordinates: 50°41′16″N 13°43′18″E
- Country: Czech Republic
- Region: Ústí nad Labem
- District: Teplice
- First mentioned: 1404

Area
  - Total: 3.19 km^{2} (1.23 sq mi)
- Elevation: 595 m (1,952 ft)

Population (2026-01-01)
  - Total: 210
  - Density: 66/km^{2} (170/sq mi)
- Time zone: UTC+1 (CET)
  - Summer (DST): UTC+2 (CEST)
- Postal code: 419 01
- Website: www.obec-mikulov.cz

Mikulov (German: Niklasberg) is a municipality and village in Teplice District in the Ústí nad Labem Region of the Czech Republic. It has about 200 inhabitants.

== Geography ==
Mikulov is located about 9 kilometres (6 mi) northwest of Teplice and 21 km (13 mi) west of Ústí nad Labem. The municipality briefly borders Germany in the north. It lies in the Ore Mountains. The highest point is at 827 m (2,713 ft) above sea level. The Divoká Bystřice River flows through the northern part of the municipality.

== Demographics ==
Historical population
Year	Pop.	±%
1869	531	—
1880	564	+6.2%
1890	576	+2.1%
1900	606	+5.2%
1910	664	+9.6%
1921	612	−7.8%
1930	739	+20.8%
1950	271	−63.3%
1961	220	−18.8%
1970	186	−15.5%
1980	136	−26.9%
1991	143	+5.1%
2001	150	+4.9%
2011	218	+45.3%
2021	220	+0.9%
Source: Censuses
