= Hammerbach (Freital) =

River of Germany

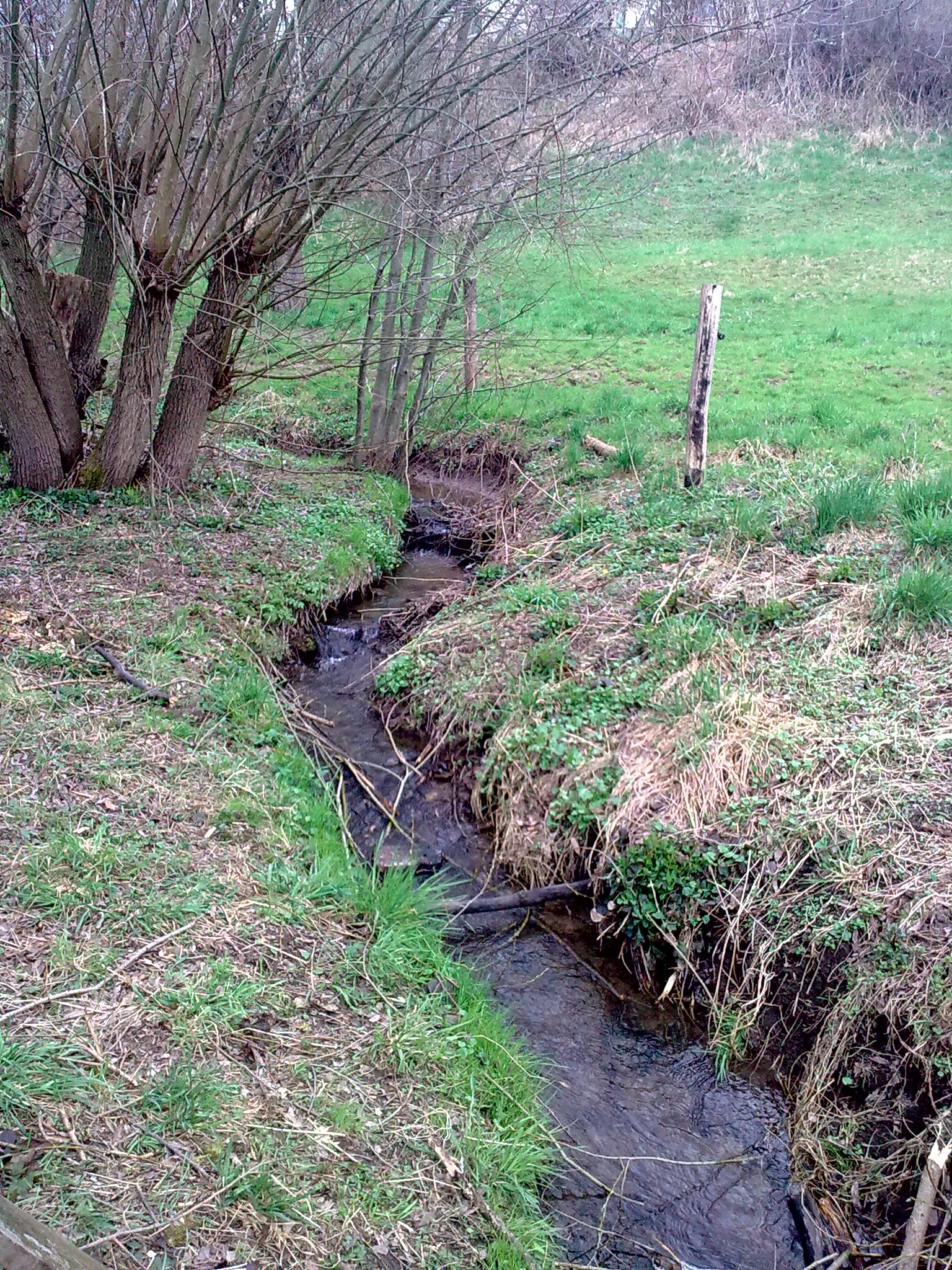

Location
- Country: Germany
- States: Saxony

Physical characteristics
- Mouth
  - location: Wiederitz
  - coordinates: 51.0184°N 13.6406°E

Basin features
- Progression: Wiederitz→ Weißeritz→ Elbe→ North Sea

The Hammerbach is a river of Saxony, Germany. It is a left tributary of the Wiederitz, which it joins near Freital.

== See also ==
- List of rivers of Saxony
