= Hammerbach =

Hammerbach may refer to:

- Hammerbach (Freital), a river of Saxony, Germany
- Hammerbach (Mže), a river of the Czech Republic and Germany
