= Bouřňák =

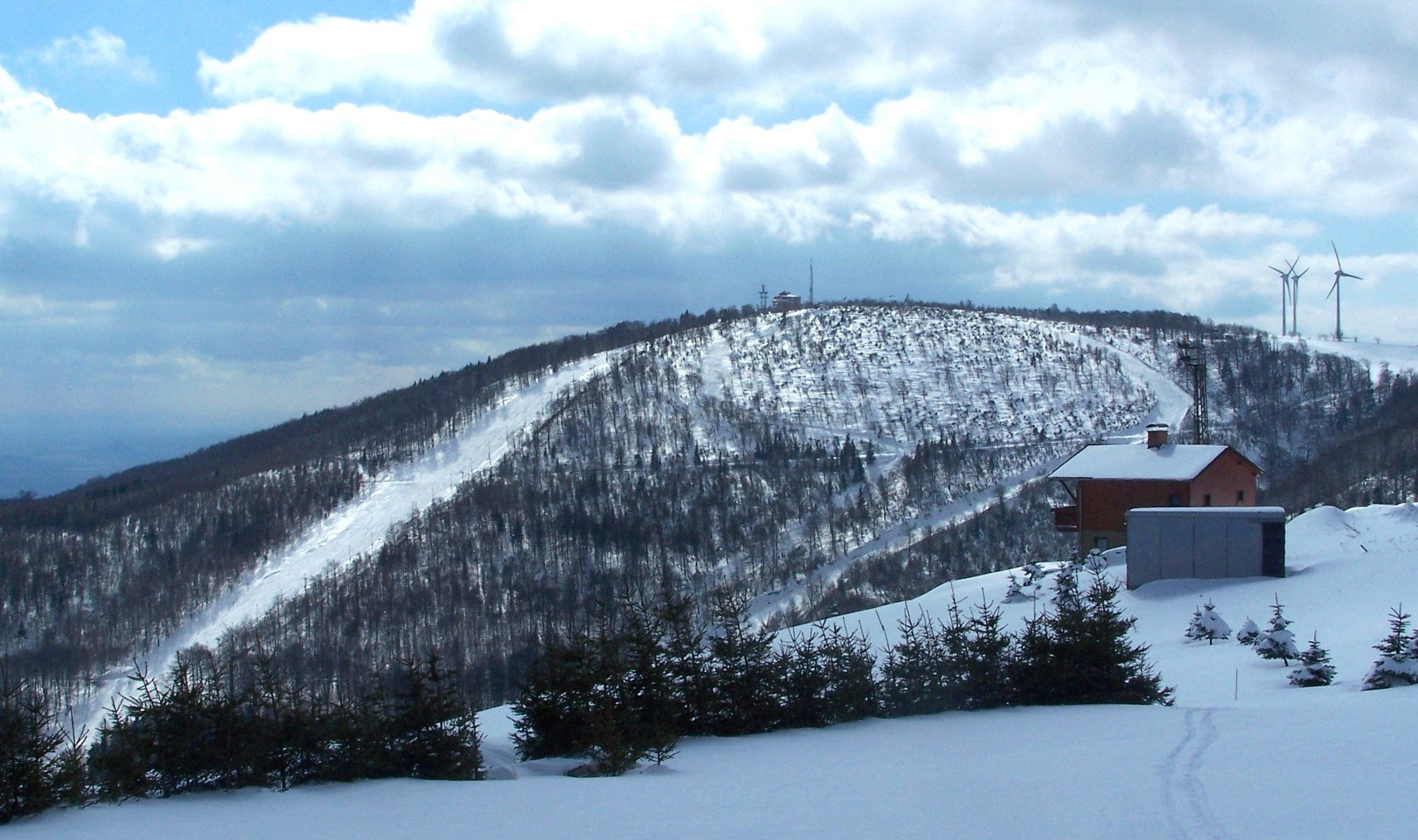
- The Bouřňák in winter

Highest point
- Elevation: 869 m (2,851 ft)
- Coordinates: 50°41′07″N 13°42′24″E

Geography
- Location within Czech Republic
- Location: Czech Republic
- Parent range: Ore Mountains

Climbing
- Access: Erection of the mountain hut in 1928 by KČT

Bouřňák (German: Stürmer) is a mountain in the Ore Mountains, in the municipality of Moldava in the Czech Republic. The mountain is known as one of the most important ski resorts of the Ore Mountains. The windswept beech forest on the northeast side of the summit, an area of 3.26 ha, has been placed under protection since 1979 as a natural monument.

== History ==
The foundation stone for the mountain hut was laid on 15 July 1928. It was built by the Czech Tourist Club. It was used by the Wehrmacht in the World War II.

== Origin of the name ==
The German and Czech name of the mountain come from the severe storms (Czech bouře, German Sturmer) that occur here.

== Views ==
The views are very rewarding. To the north it is somewhat obscured by the crest of the Ore Mountains, but the views to the south, east and west are impressive. Over 206 towns and villages may be seen from the summit, from Ústí nad Labem to Most. In the distance Ještěd, Říp in front of Prague, the Křivoklátsko Woods, the Doupov Mountains and Kahleberg may be made out.

== Location and surrounding area ==
The Bouřňák lies in the Ore Mountains in Moldava municipal territory, 10 kilometres (6 mi) northwest of Teplice and 10 kilometres (6 mi) southwest of Altenberg on a prominent escarpment of the Ore Mountains. At the foot of the mountain is the village of Mikulov and the town of Hrob. Immediately next to the shoulder of the mountain, on the crest of the Ore Mountain ridge, is the village of Nové Město (a part of Moldava), today purely a resort.

== Routes to the summit ==
- The shortest way to the top runs along the road from Neustadt. Formerly the Old Freiberg to Teplitz Post Road ran along here.
- The Bouřňák offers an extensive range of cross-country skiing trails and downhill runs in winter. There are several prepared trails and lifts. Since 2005 there has been a snowboard fun park.

== Mountain Rescue Service station ==
The Mountain Rescue Service of the Czech Republic has its rescue station on the peak. It is permanently open. During the week, the station is occupied by full-time employees; at weekends, volunteers help with rescue duties.

== Gallery ==
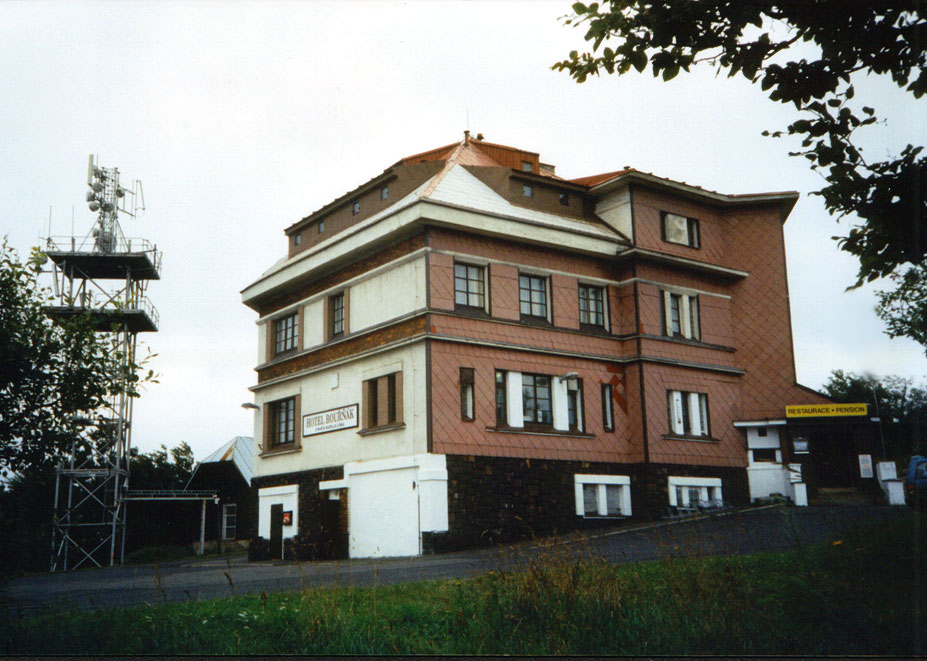
The mountain hut on the Bouřňák

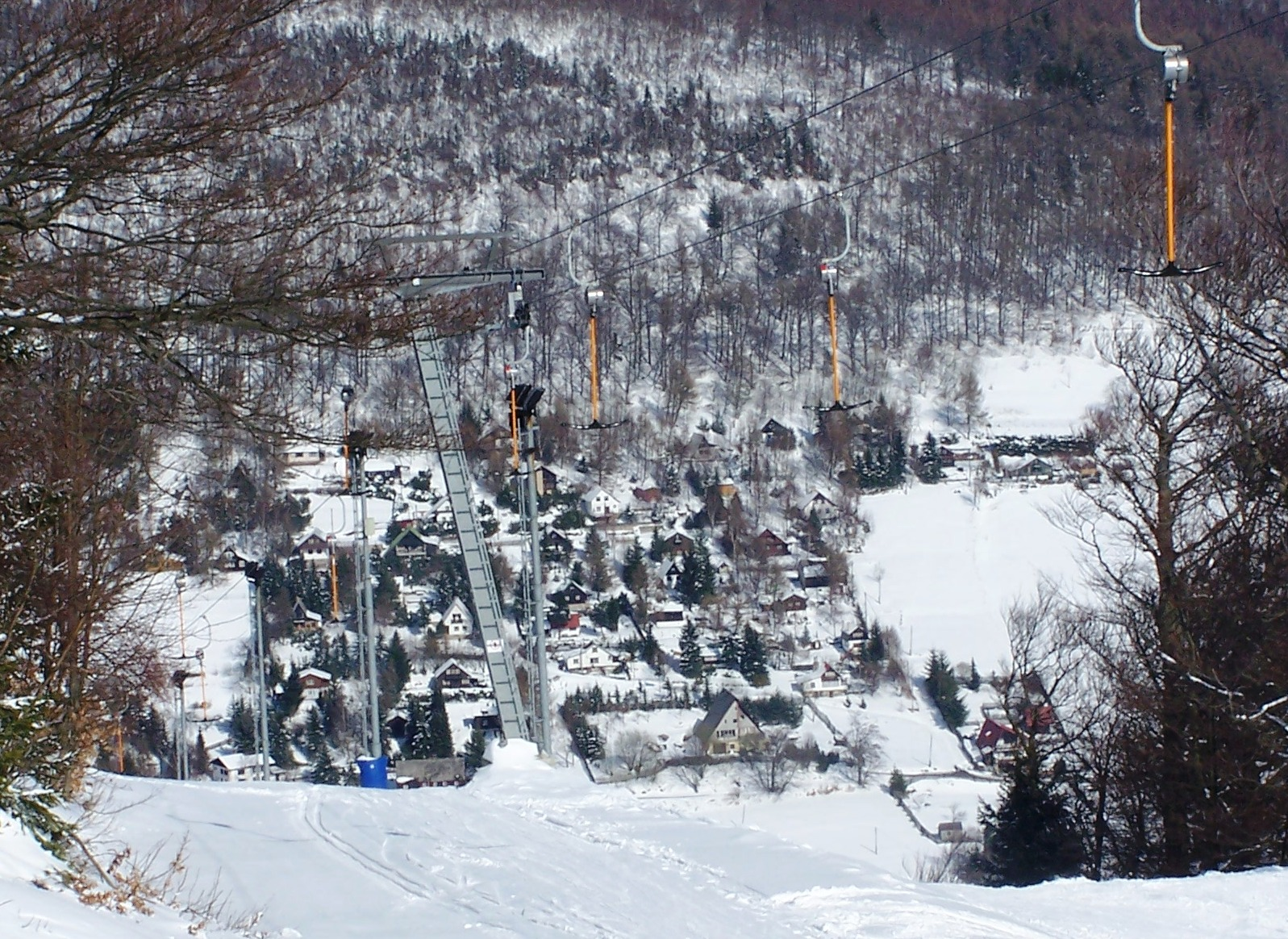
View of Mikulov

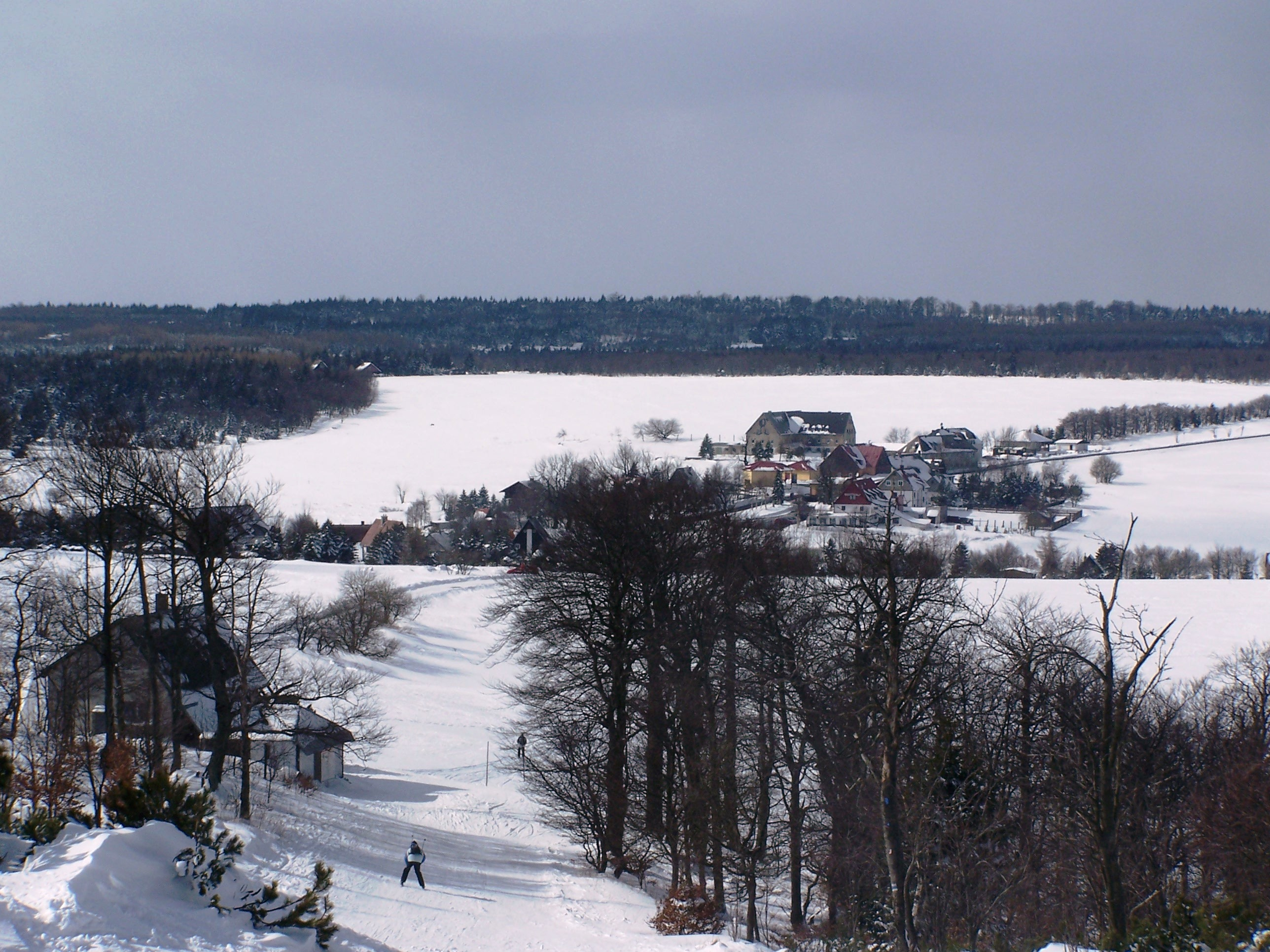
View towards Nové Město

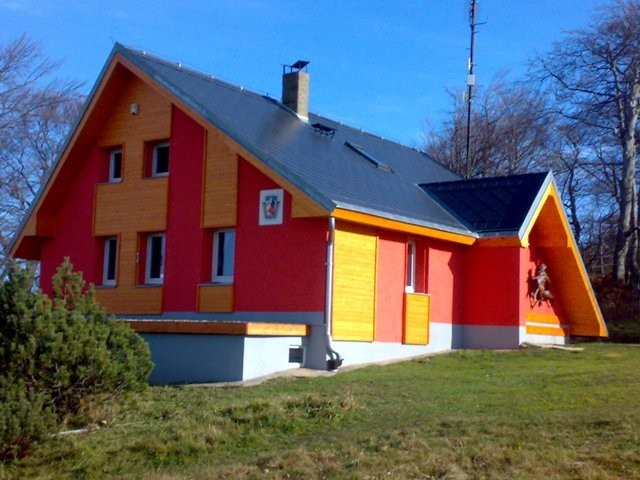
Mountain Rescue Service station on the Bouřňák
