= Most–Moldava railway =

Railway line in the Czech Republic

Most–Moldava v Krušných horách
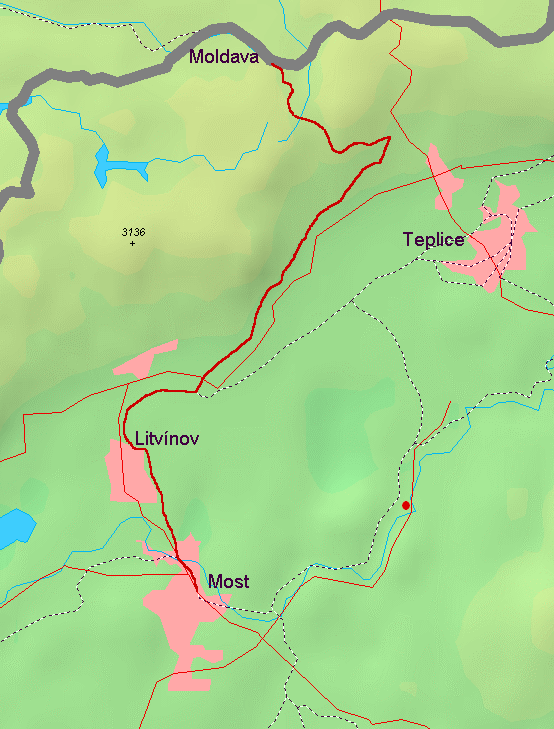

Service
- Route number: 135

Technical
- Line length: 40 km (25 mi)
- Track gauge: 1,435 mm (4 ft 8 1/2 in) standard gauge
- Minimum radius: 250 m (820 ft)
- Electrification: Catenary; Most–Louka u Litvínova: 3 kV DC
- Maximum incline: 3.6 %

The Most–Moldava railway is a branch line in Czech Republic, which was originally built and operated by the Prague-Dux Railway. The line, formerly known as theTeplitz Semmering Railway (Teplitzer Semmeringbahn) runs from Most (Brüx) over the Ore Mountains to Moldava (Moldau) and used to have a junction with the Nossen-Moldau railway there in Saxony until 1945. In the Czech Republic the line is known today as the Moldavská horská dráha (Moldava Mountain Railway) or Krušnohorská železnice (Ore Mountain Railway).

== Sources ==
- Zdeněk Hudec (u.a.) (2006). Atlas drah České republiky 2006–2007 (in Czech) (2nd ed.). Prague: Pavel Malkus. ISBN 80-87047-00-1.
