= Nové Město =

Nové Město may refer to places in the Czech Republic:

- Nové Město (Hradec Králové District), a municipality and village in the Hradec Králové Region
- Nové Město na Moravě, a town in the Vysočina Region
- Nové Město nad Metují, a town in the Hradec Králové Region
- Nové Město pod Smrkem, a town in the Liberec Region
- New Town, Prague (Czech: Nové Město), a district of Prague
- Nové Město, a part of Broumov in the Region
- Nové Město, a village and part of Jáchymov in the Karlovy Vary Region
- Nové Město, a part of Jičín in the Hradec Králové Region
- Nové Město, a part of Karviná in the Moravian-Silesian Region
- Nové Město, a village and part of Moldava (Teplice District) in the Ústí nad Labem Region
- Nové Město, a part of Rokycany in the Plzeň Region
- Nové Město, a part of Třebíč in the Vysočina Region
- Čáslav-Nové Město, a part of Čáslav in the Central Bohemian Region
- Děčín II-Nové Město, a part of Děčín in the Ústí nad Labem Region
- Liberec II-Nové Město, a part of Liberec in the Liberec Region

== See also ==
- Nové Mesto (disambiguation)
- Novo Mesto
