= Wiederitz =

River in Germany

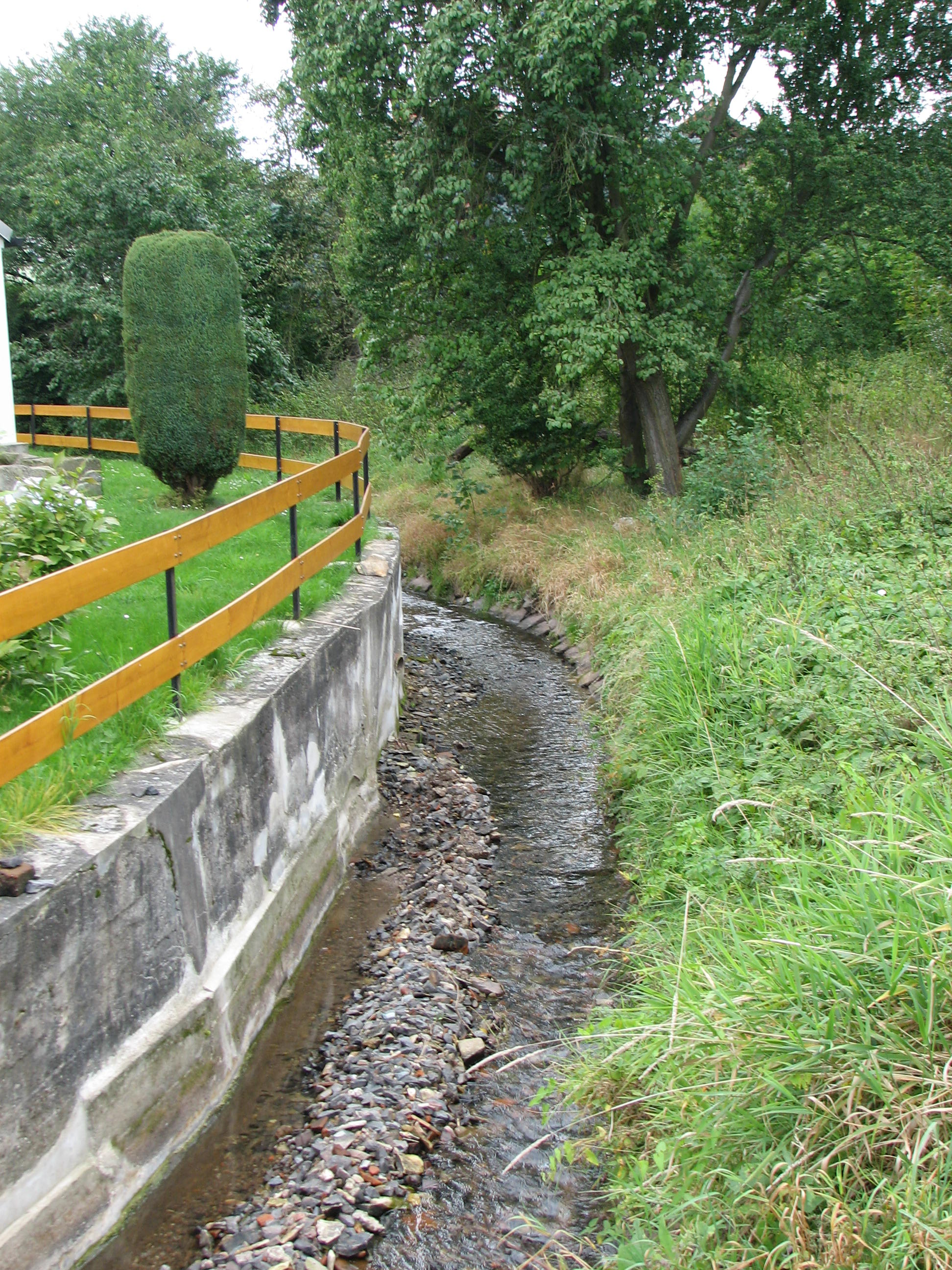

Location
- Country: Germany
- State: Saxony

Physical characteristics
- Mouth
  - location: Weißeritz
  - coordinates: 51.0097°N 13.6622°E

Basin features
- Progression: Weißeritz→ Elbe→ North Sea

The Wiederitz is a river of Saxony, Germany. It is a left tributary of the Weißeritz, which it joins in Freital.

== See also ==
- List of rivers of Saxony
