= Red Weißeritz =

River in Germany

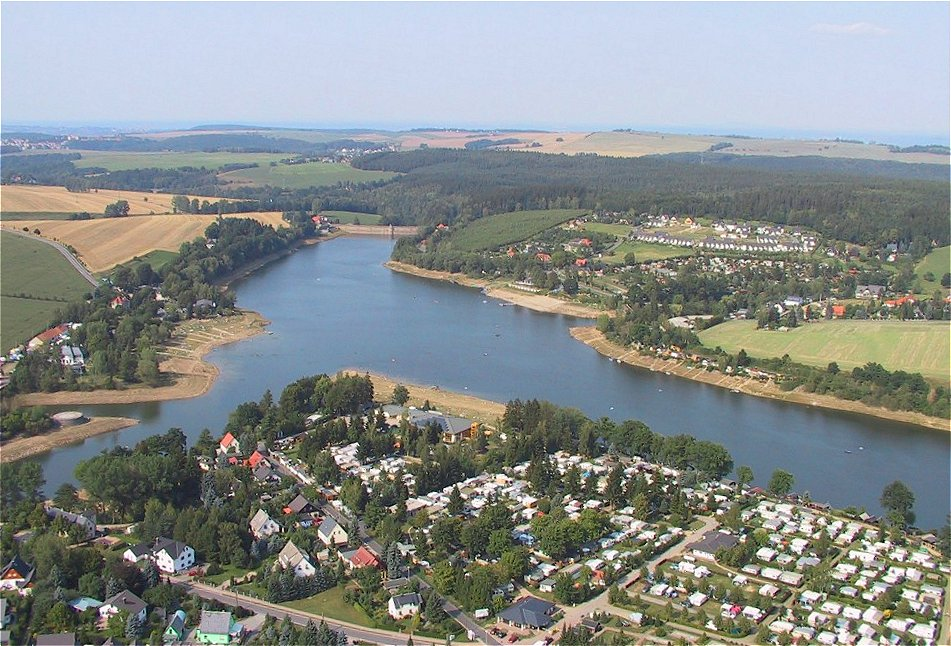
- The Malter Reservoir

Location
- Country: Germany

Physical characteristics
- Source
  - location: Eastern Ore Mountains
  - elevation: 787 m (2,582 ft)
- Mouth
  - location: Weißeritz
  - coordinates: 50.9816°N 13.6296°E
- Length: 36.5 km (22.7 mi)
- Basin size: 161.2 km^{2} (62.2 sq mi)

Basin features
- Progression: Weißeritz→ Elbe→ North Sea

The Red Weißeritz (German: Rote Weißeritz) is a river of Saxony, Germany.

The Red Weißeritz is the right headstream of the Weißeritz. It is 36.5 km (22.7 mi) long.

The river's source is the Eastern Ore Mountains near Altenberg at a height of about 787 metres. It drops through a height of 606 metres as it heads north-west, running through Schmiedeberg, the district town of Dippoldiswalde and ending in Freital where it forms the Weißeritz together with the longer tributary of the Wild Weißeritz. The Malter Reservoir was built between 1908 and 1913 between Dippoldiswalde and Freital for flood protection reasons after the 1897 floods.

The deep valley is an important transport route. It is an historic approach to a major mountain pass over the Ore Mountains (the Graupen Pass). The Weisseritz railway runs through the Weißeritz valley up to Kipsdorf (a district of Altenberg), climbing about 350 metres in height. The B 170 federal road follows the river bank between Dippoldiswalde and Waldbärenburg where it leaves the valley, climbing through three hairpin turns.

The Red Weißeritz caused massive destruction during the 2002 European floods. Housing and especially road infrastructure and the Weisseritz railway was destroyed or damaged over a wide area. The flood retention basin of the Malter Reservoir completely overflowed. The area around the source of the river received precipitation of up to 312 mm in 24 hours.

== See also ==
- List of rivers of Saxony
