= Old Freiberg to Teplitz Post Road =

Road in Germany

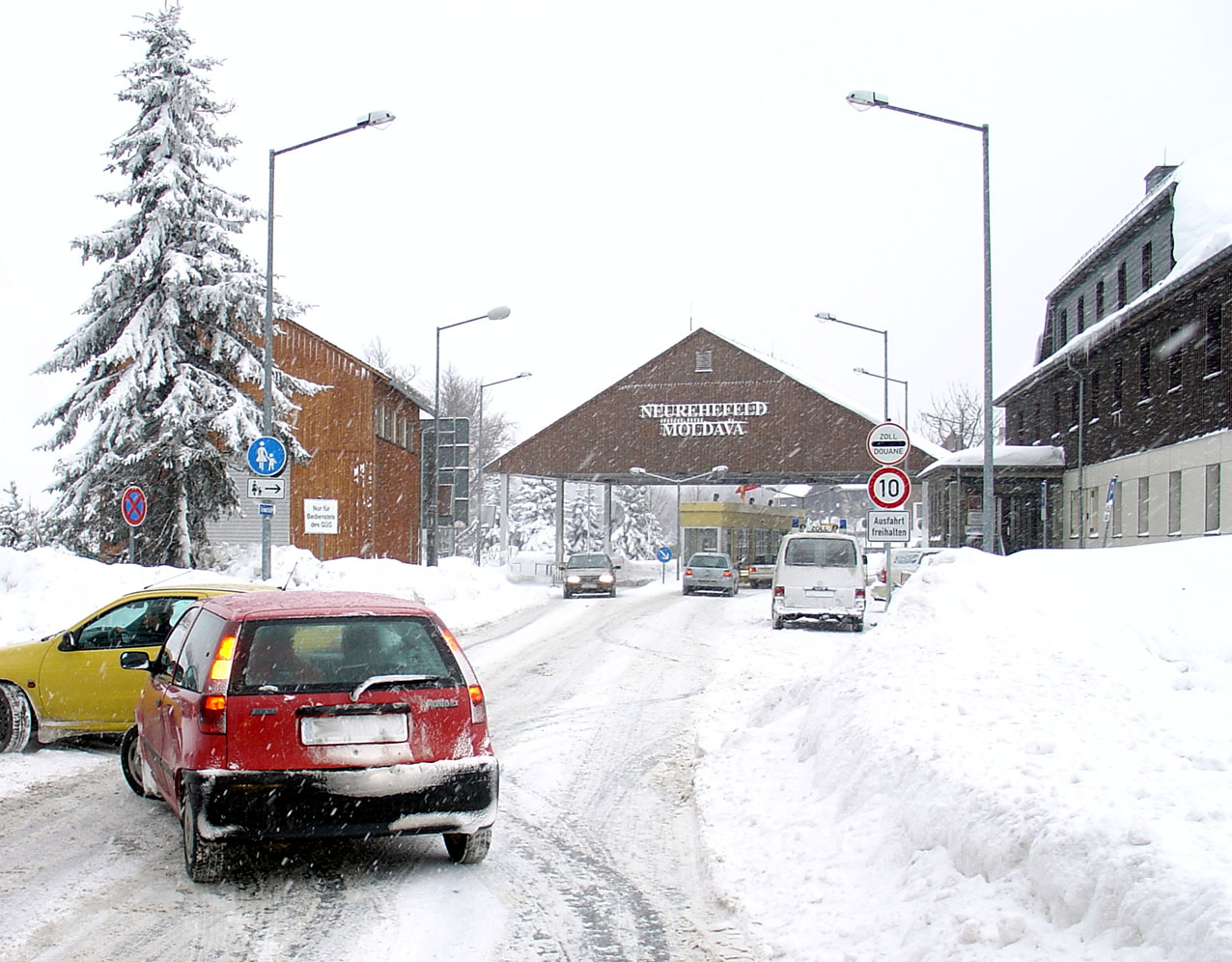
Border crossing at Neurehefeld on the Old Post Road

The Old Freiburg to Teplitz Post Road (German: Alte Freiberg-Teplitzer Poststraße) is one of the passes over the Ore Mountains and was a major transport link from the mining town of Freiberg (Saxony) over the crest of the Eastern Ore Mountains to the North Bohemian spa resort of Teplitz, now Teplice.

== Literature ==
- Balder Preuß/Jörg Brückner: Zum Verlauf der kursächsischen Poststraße von Freiberg nach Teplitz. In: Mitteilungen des Freiberger Altertumsvereins, 78. Heft, Freiberg in Sachsen, 1997, p. 32-43.
- Balder Preuß/Jörg Brückner: Wie verlief die kursächsische Poststraße von Freiberg nach Teplitz? In: Erzgeb. Heimatblätter 19 (1997), H. 3, p. 5-9.
- Balder Preuß/Jörg Brückner: Spurensuche: Die alte Poststraße zwischen Freiberg und Teplitz. In: Jahrbuch der Region Freiberg 1998, p. 174 ff.
