= Nové Mesto =

Nové Mesto (Slovak for "New Town") may refer to:

- abbreviation of Nové Mesto nad Váhom, a town in Slovakia
- abbreviation of Nové Mesto pod Šiatrom (Sátoraljaújhely), a town in Hungary
- abbreviation of Kysucké Nové Mesto, a town in Slovakia
- Nové Mesto, Bratislava, a city part of Bratislava
- Nové Mesto, Košice, a city part of Košice
- Nové Mesto, Poprad, a city part of Poprad
- Nové Mesto, Trnava, a city part of Trnava

== See also ==
- Nové Město (disambiguation)
- Novo Mesto
