= Wild Weißeritz =

River in the Czech Republic and in Germany

Wilde Weißeritz
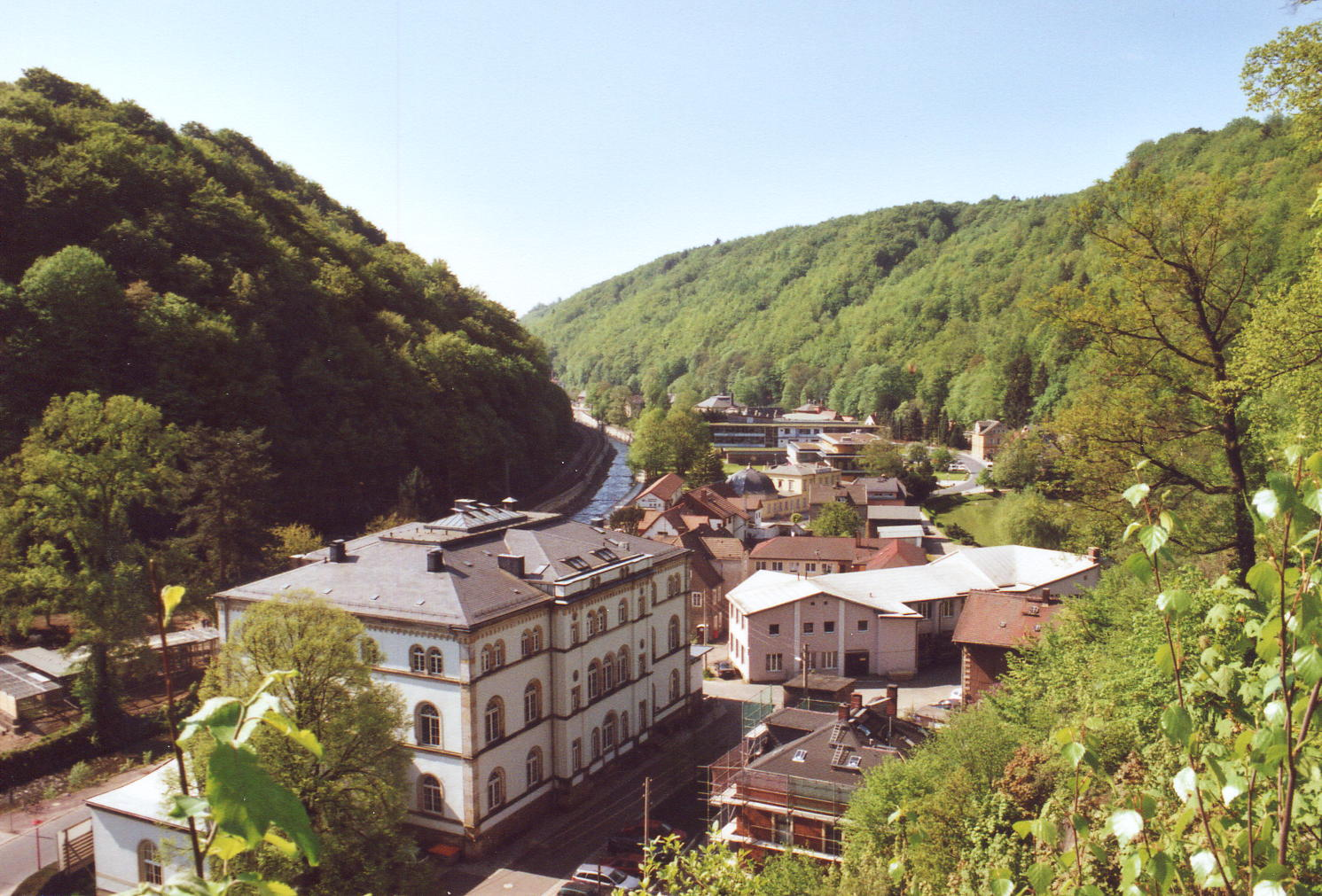
- Wilde Weißeritz in Tharandt

Location
- Countries: Germany; Czech Republic

Physical characteristics
- Source
  - location: Moldava, Ore Mountains
  - elevation: 823 m (2,700 ft)
- Mouth
  - location: Weißeritz
  - coordinates: 50°58′54″N 13°37′46″E
  - elevation: 823 m (2,700 ft)
- Length: 52.5 km (32.6 mi)
- Basin size: 162.7 km^{2} (62.8 sq mi)

Basin features
- Progression: Weißeritz→ Elbe→ North Sea

The Wild Weißeritz (German: Wilde Weißeritz, Czech: Divoká Bystřice) is a river in the Czech Republic and in the German state of Saxony which drains the eastern Ore Mountains. It is the longest tributary of the Weißeritz.

The valley of the Wild Weißeritz is almost free of settlements. The Wild Weißeritz runs through Tharandt just some kilometres before it forms the Weißeritz together with the tributary Red Weißeritz in Freital.

The river feeds two water reservoirs for drinking water abstraction (Klingenberg Reservoir and Lehnmühle Reservoir).

== See also ==
- List of rivers of Saxony
- List of rivers of the Czech Republic
