= Freital-Hainsberg station =

Railway station in Freital, Germany

Freital-Hainsberg
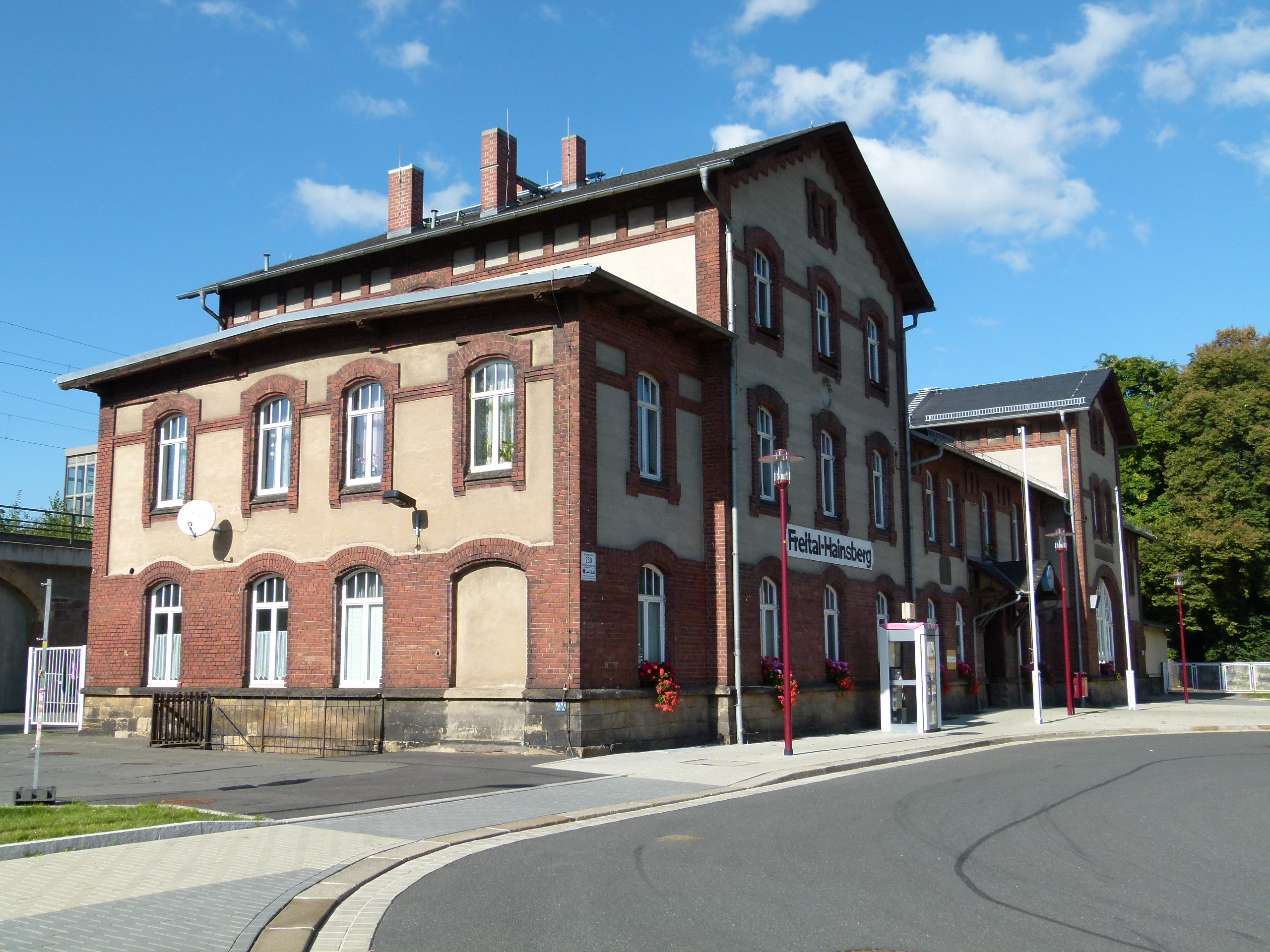
- Entrance building from the street side

General information
- Location: Dresdner Str. 280, Freital, Saxony; Germany
- Coordinates: 50°59′19″N 13°38′15″E
- Owner: Deutsche Bahn
- Operator: DB Netz; DB Station&Service
- Lines: Dresden–Werdau (km 10.09); Weisseritz Valley Railway (km -0.11); formerly Potschappel–Hainsberg (km 2.83)
- Platforms: normal gauge: 2; narrow gauge: 1

Construction
- Accessible: Yes

Other information
- Station code: 1912
- DS100 code: DHG (Freital-Hainsberg—freight); DFH (Freital-Hainsberg Hp—passengers)
- IBNR: 8010116
- Category: 5
- Website: www.bahnhof.de

History
- Opened: 28 June 1855
- Former names: Hainsberg

Services
Preceding station	Mitteldeutsche Regiobahn	Following station
Freital-Hainsberg West towards Zwickau Hbf	RB 30	Freital-Deuben towards Dresden Hbf
Preceding station	Dresden S-Bahn	Following station
Freital-Hainsberg West towards Freiberg (Sachs)	S 3	Freital-Deuben towards Dresden Hbf
Heritage railway
Terminus	Weisseritztalbahn	Freital-Coßmannsdorf
Location

Freital-Hainsberg station is a station on the Dresden–Werdau railway in the district of Hainsberg of the municipality of Freital in the German state of Saxony. The Weißeritz Valley Railway branches off to Kipsdorf from the station. Since 31 May 1992, the station has been served by the Dresden S-Bahn.

== History ==
=== Name ===
The station has had four different names in its history:

- until 12 January 1918: Hainsberg
- until 12 Dezember 1933: Hainsberg (Sa)
- until 29 September 1965: Hainsberg (Sachs)
- since 29 September 1965: Freital-Hainsberg

=== Operations ===
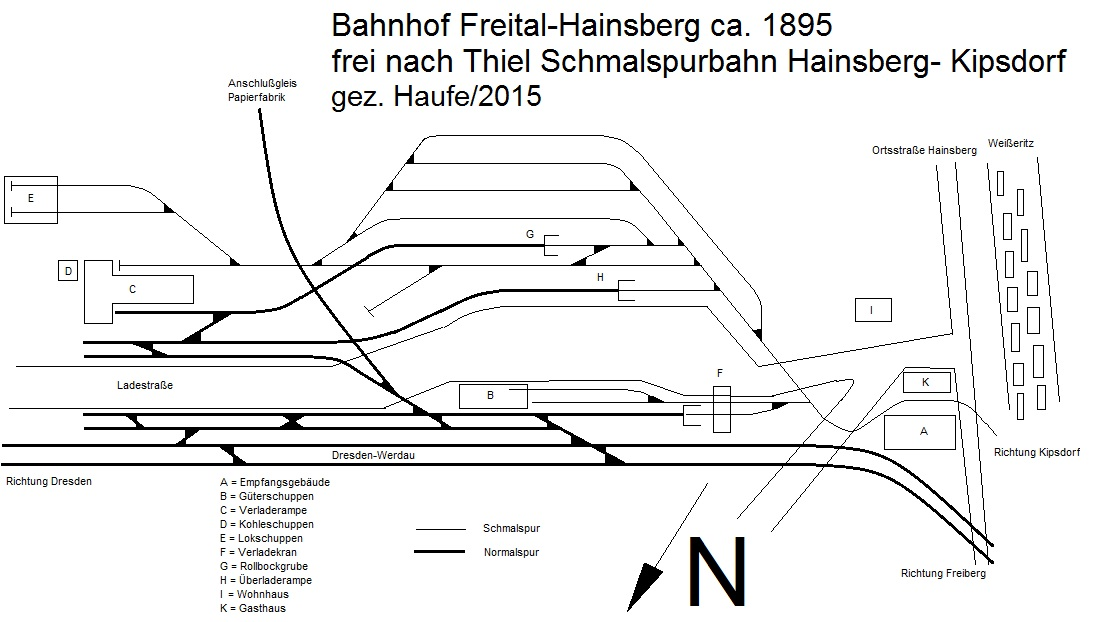
Track plan of Hainsberg in 1895

It is not known how the tracks of Hainsberg station were laid out at the time of the opening of the Dresden–Werdau railway. In 1874, the station received its first entrance building. The most important station in modern Freital at that time was Freital-Potschappel, which had the most connections to the existing coal mines in Freital. There was no significant growth in transport services at the railway station until the opening of the Weißeritz Valley Railway in 1883. The track systems were expanded and included seven standard-gauge tracks and four narrow-gauge tracks. The tracks were still on the same level. A four-stall locomotive shed of the narrow-gauge railway lay in the eastern part of the station area. The station never had a locomotive shed for standard-gauge operations.

In the area used for the transfer of goods between the standard-gauge tracks and the narrow-gauge tracks, the standard-gauge tracks lay to the east and the narrow-gauge tracks to the west. The entrance building was located approximately on the site later occupied by the former signalbox. Passengers had to cross the tracks on the level to reach the trains. The station also included a small goods shed, a loading ramp, a four-stall locomotive shed for the narrow-gauge vehicles with maintenance facilities, a Rollbock pit and a ramp for loading narrow-gauge wagons on standard-gauge wagons.

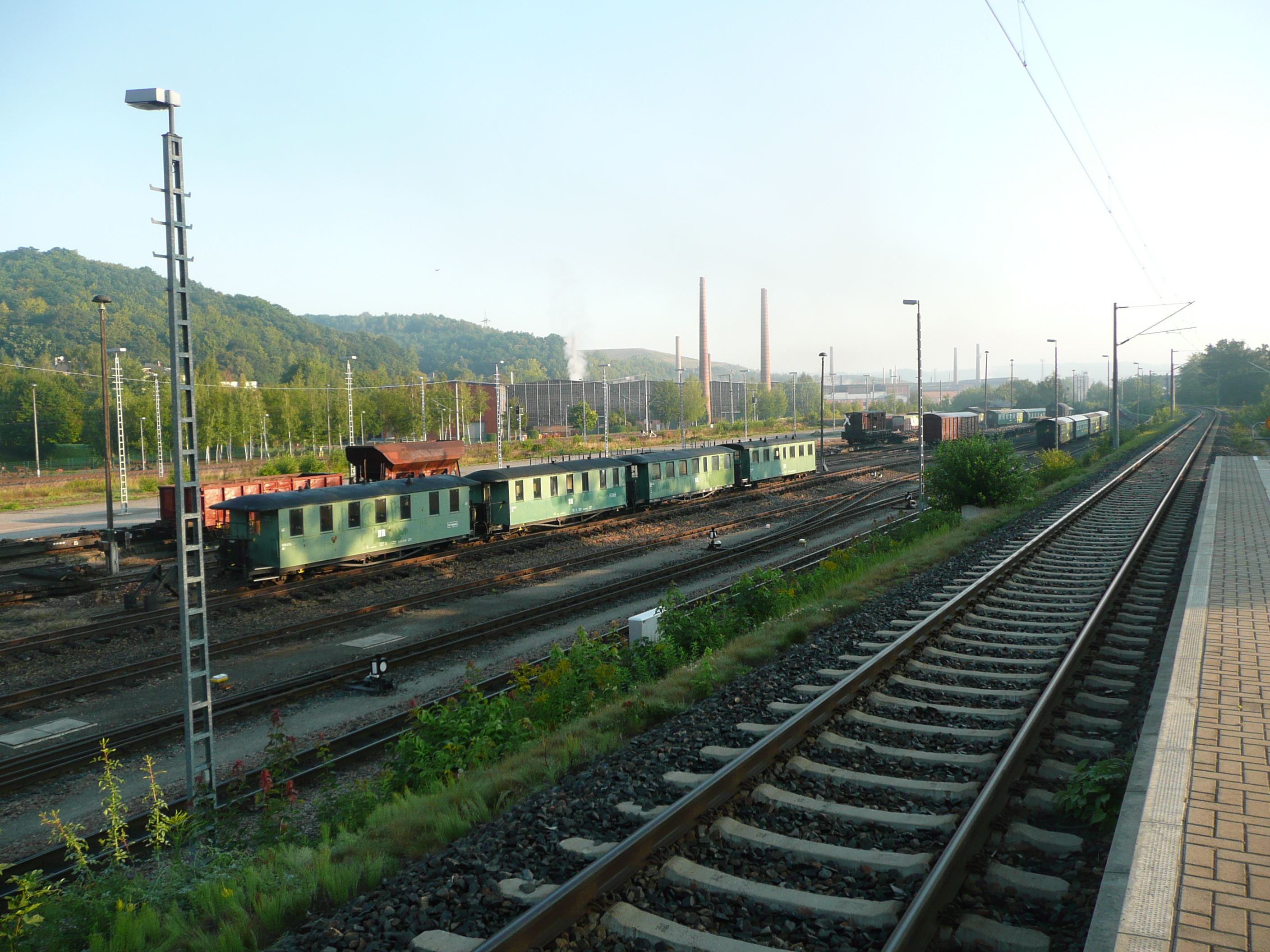
Hainsberg station tracks after reconstruction in 1910, looking towards Dresden

In order to separate the operations between main-line and local traffic, the tracks in the Freital area were elevated, which greatly altered the track layout. The standard-gauge tracks were increased to four tracks and the freight tracks were separated from the passenger tracks. As a whole, the station moved further east. In 1904, a new entrance building was built on the south side of the station. The old building was demolished together with the old narrow-gauge locomotive depot by 1905. The narrow-gauge tracks were built at the level of the freight tracks between the freight tracks and the higher passenger tracks. Passengers could now access the platforms through a passenger subway without crossing any tracks. The 300 metre-long island platform between the standard-gauge passenger tracks with a useful length of 500 metres indicates the length of the trains used on the state railway at the time. For the transport of luggage, a separate tunnel ran from the entrance building to the platform, where there was a baggage lift. Two passenger tunnels were built between the north and the south parts of the station. With the reconstruction of the tracks, the at-grade crossings of the tracks of the Dresden–Werdau railway and the Weißeritz Valley Railway disappeared, the freight sheds were newly built, a loading road was laid out, and signal boxes were built to control the station tracks. In total, the station had 13 standard-gauge tracks and, with the tracks to the locomotive shed, nine narrow-gauge tracks. The narrow-gauge tracks were completely remodelled. The locomotive shed was placed on the west side of the station next to the connecting track to the paper factory. Originally, it also had four stalls, but in 1932 it had three tracks and six stalls. On the east side of the station, there were pieces of equipment for handling goods on the standard-gauge track, such as a Rollbock pit and a goods hall. With the rebuilding of the station, a connection was created from the Weißeritz Valley Railway to the narrow-gauge Freital-Potschappel–Nossen railway for the exchange of rollingstock with the building of the Potschappel–Hainsberg railway.

Since the rebuilding of the station, there has been a rail connection to the Freital steelworks. In the case of the narrow-gauge tracks, the tracks were somewhat too confined, so that some equipment had to terminate in the former Freital Coßmannsdorf station. In 1918, the name of the station was given with the suffix Sachs. In the 1930s, the station received a small locomotive shed.

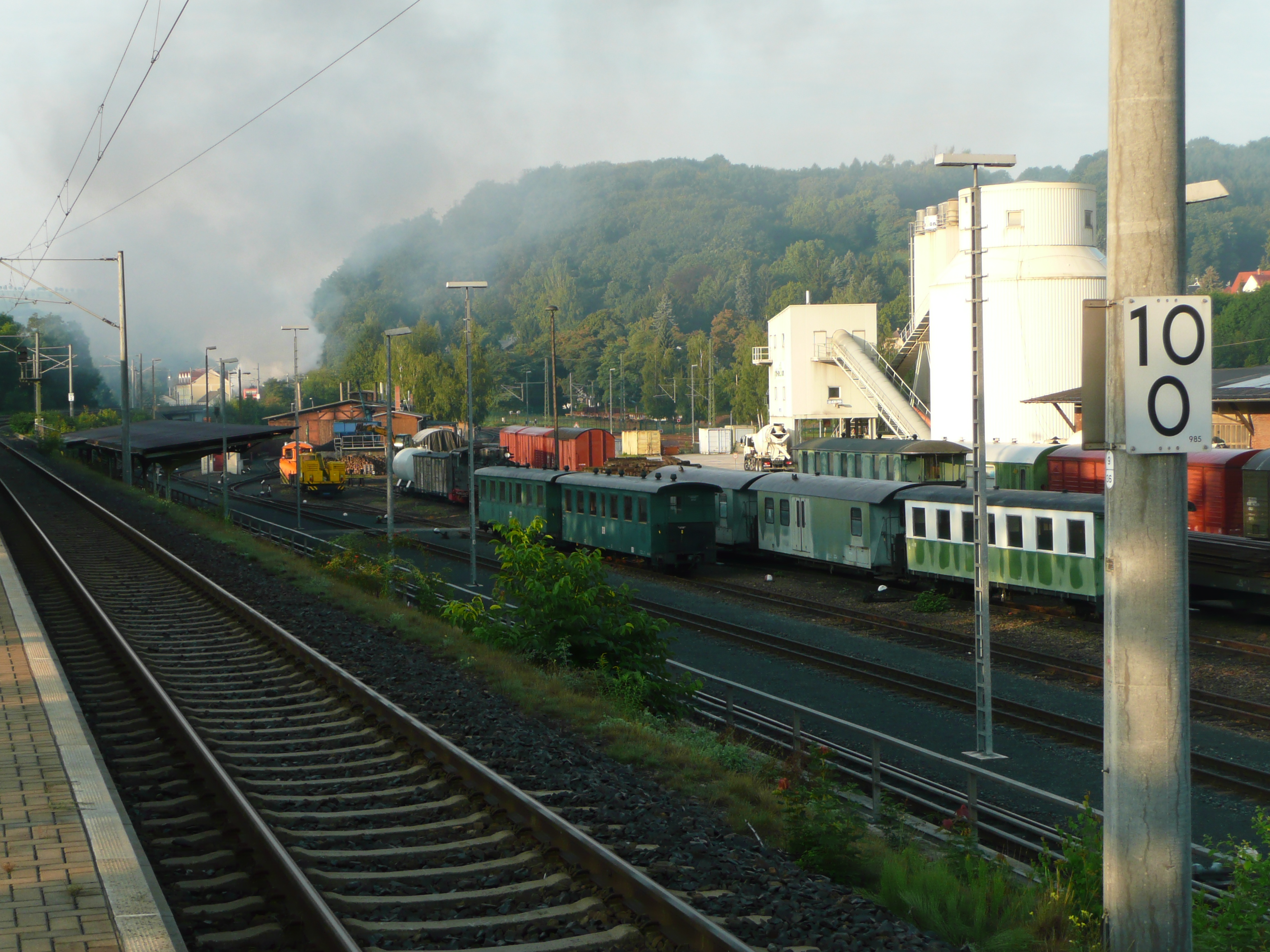
Railway tracks of Hainsberg station after reconstruction in 1910, looking towards Tharandt

Evidently after 1945, an approximately 600 metres of normal gauge freight train was dismantled as reparations with the end of the Second World War. Since freight traffic on the narrow-gauge line fell in the 1960s, a long timber loading ramp, a transhipment platform and an open transhipment hall were shut down and demolished. On the standard-gauge line, general traffic was handled at the Freital-Potschappel station, so the freight yard was used for other purposes. In 1964, the station's name was changed to Freital-Hainsberg. At the end of the 1970s, freight traffic at Freital-Hainsberg station was still so great that a locomotive of class V 60, which had been specifically installed here, was used. In particular, the provision of wagon loads for the Freital stainless steelworks and the provision of wagon loads for the narrow-gauge line took up the yard's capacity. The siding to the paper factory, which can be seen on old track plans, no longer exists.

After 1989, the freight traffic at the station declined significantly, so that today a small locomotive is sufficient for occasional shunting. From 2003 on, the railway systems are controlled by an electronic interlocking. The mechanical signal boxes were closed in 2003 and demolished in 2006. The narrow-gauge railway now has colour light signals as entrance and exit signals. A bus stop and bicycle parking spaces were established in the station forecourt.
