= Weißeritz =

River in Germany

(United) Weißeritz (Vereinigte) Weißeritz
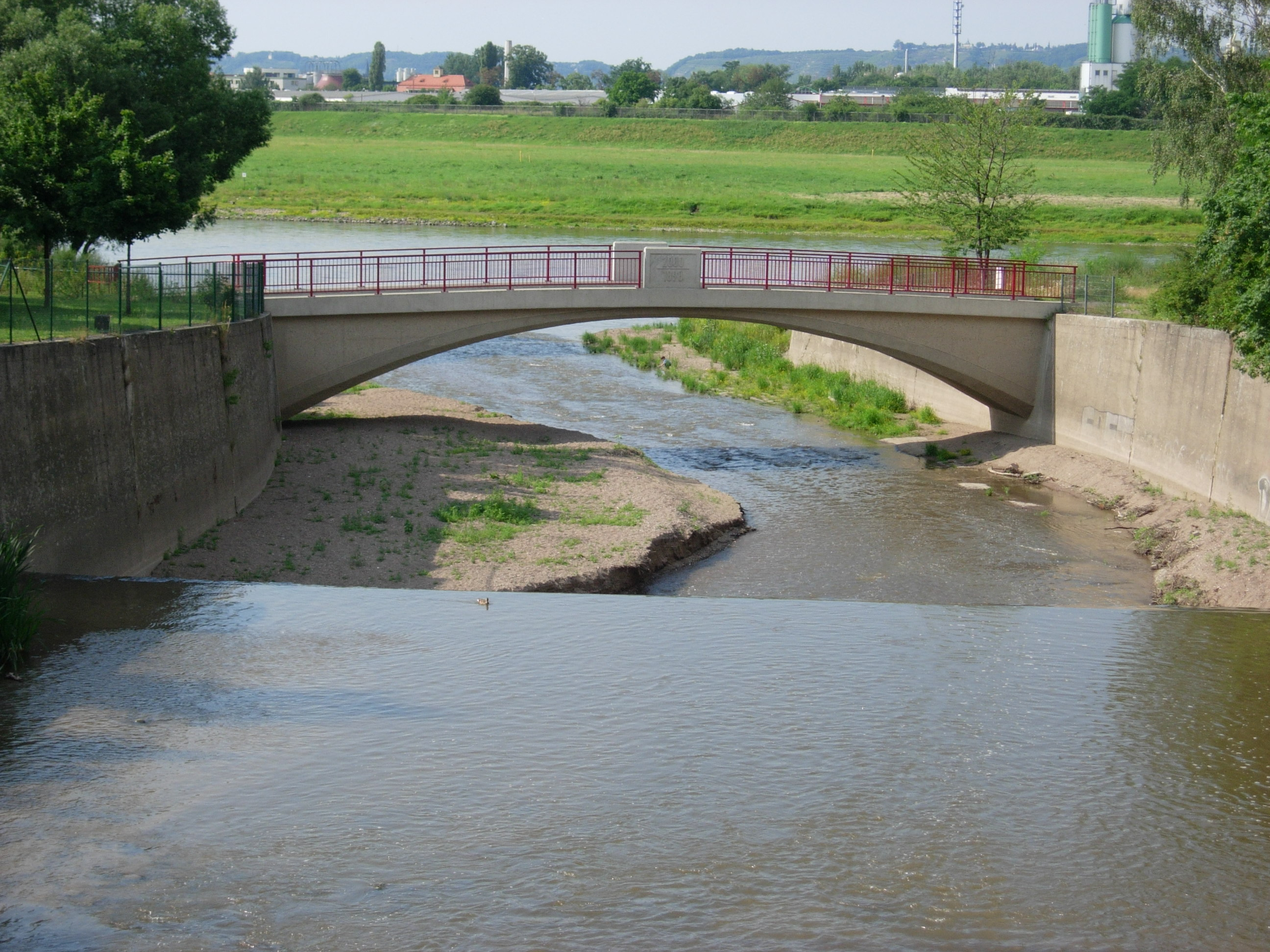
- The Weißeritz estuary in Dresden

Location
- Country: Germany
- State: Saxony

Physical characteristics
- Source
  - location: confluence of the Wild Weißeritz and Red Weißeritz 50.9816°N 13.6296°E
  - elevation: 188 m (617 ft)
- Mouth
  - location: Elbe
  - coordinates: 51.0633°N 13.6867°E
- Length: 13.7 km [8.5 mi] (607 kilometres [377 mi] incl. the BRD part of the Wild Weißeritz)

Basin features
- Progression: Elbe→ North Sea

The Weißeritz (German pronunciation: [ˈvaɪsəʁɪts]; also: Vereinigte Weißeritz in German i.e. United Weißeritz, Bystrica in Sorbian) is a river of Saxony, Germany. It is 13.7 km [8.5 mi] long and a left tributary of the Elbe.

The river is formed by the confluence of the Wild Weißeritz and Red Weißeritz in Freital. The Weißeritz runs through Freital and Dresden. It crosses the deep valley Plauenscher Grund between Freital and Dresden and enters the Dresden Basin. The railway line from Dresden to Nuremberg runs next to the river in this close valley. The river is displaced in an old sidearm in Dresden for flood protection reasons and therefore canalised. In Dresden, it enters the Elbe from the left.

Its Sorbian name is derived from West Slavic bystrica (clear water). The official name of the river used in documents and hydrographic maps is Vereinigte Weißeritz (United Weißeritz). The highest points of the Weißeritz watershed are at about 800 metres [2,600 ft] elevation. Nevertheless, the Wild Weißeritz is the longest tributary, the watersheds of both Weißeritz rivers are almost equal in area (162.7 km^{2} [62.8 sq mi] and 161.2 km^{2} [62.2 sq mi]).

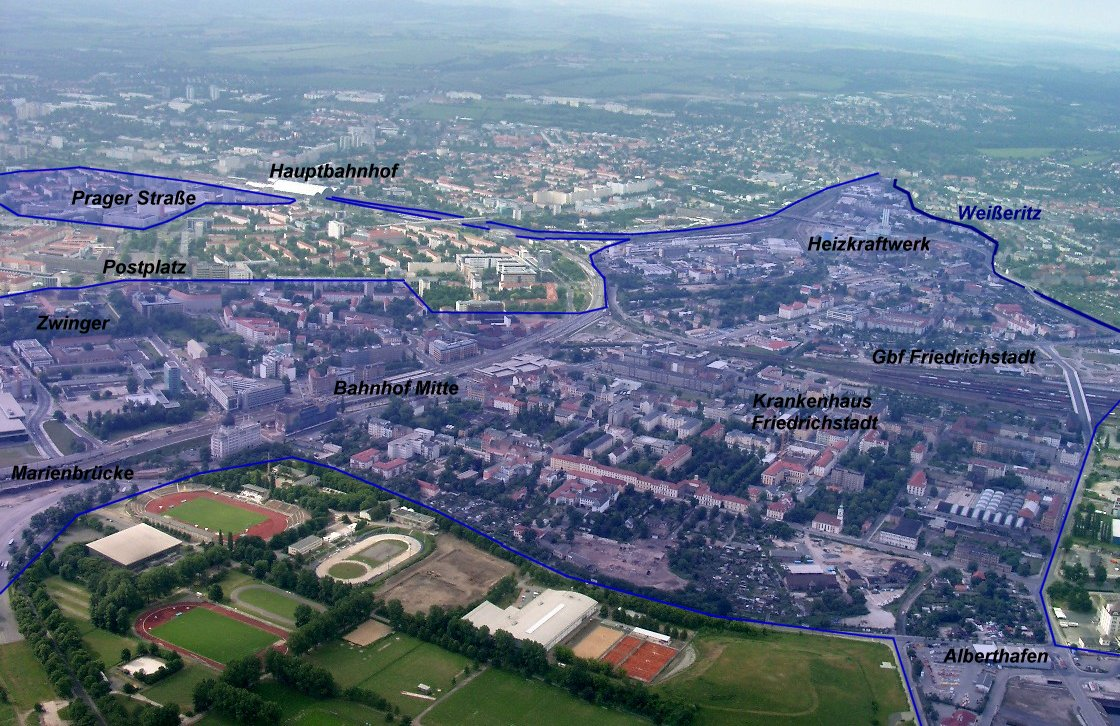
Flood plain of the Weißeritz in the Dresden inner city

The Weißeritz caused severe damage during the 2002 European floods in Dresden and Freital. The river reached Dresden Central Station as well as the Zwinger and flooded some districts of the inner city. Due to the river's high fall from 188 m to 106 m in Dresden some houses were completely destroyed in the torrential flood. The river left its canalised bed near the inner city and went through its old run directly towards the Elbe River.

== See also ==
- List of rivers of Saxony
- Weißeritzkreis
