= Moldava (Teplice District) =

- Municipality
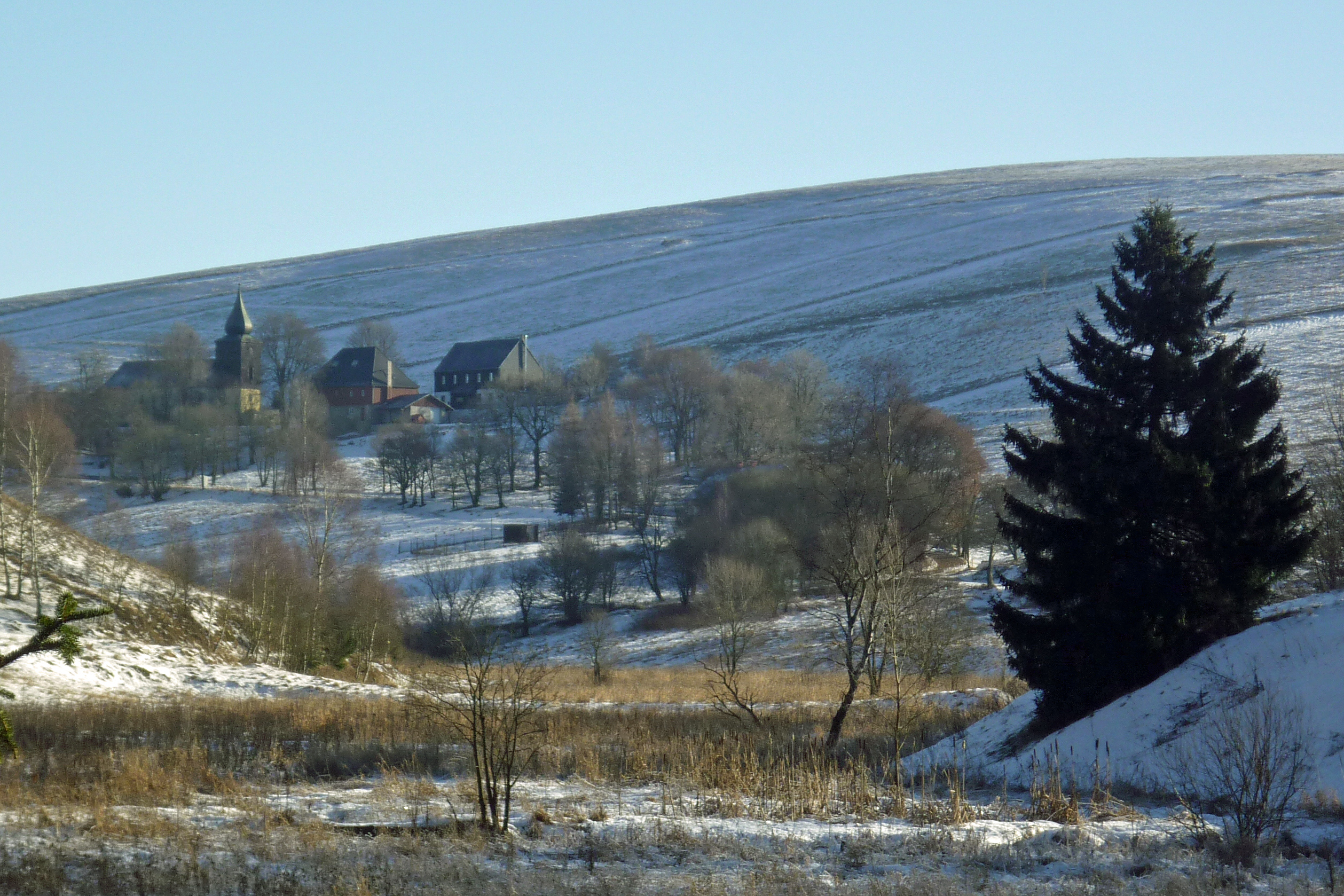
- Western part of Moldava

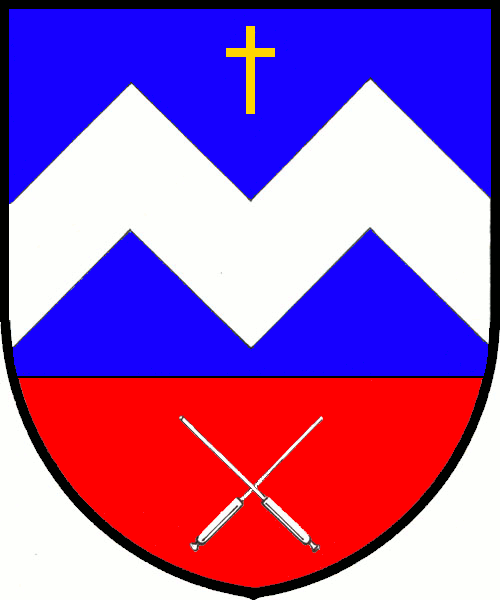
- Flag Coat of arms

- Location in the Czech Republic
- Coordinates: 50°43′15″N 13°39′26″E
- Country: Czech Republic
- Region: Ústí nad Labem
- District: Teplice
- First mentioned: 1346

Area
  - Total: 32.42 km^{2} (12.52 sq mi)
- Elevation: 725 m (2,379 ft)

Population (2026-01-01)
  - Total: 175
  - Density: 5.40/km^{2} (14.0/sq mi)
- Time zone: UTC+1 (CET)
  - Summer (DST): UTC+2 (CEST)
- Postal code: 417 81
- Website: www.moldava.cz

Moldava (German: Moldau) is a municipality and village in Teplice District in the Ústí nad Labem Region of the Czech Republic. It has about 200 inhabitants.

== Administrative division ==
Moldava consists of two municipal parts (in brackets population according to the 2021 census):

- Moldava (132)
- Nové Město (40)

== Etymology ==
The village was named after the Freiberger Mulde River. In the first record the village appeared as Muldaw.

== Geography ==
Moldava is located about 14 kilometres (9 mi) northwest of Teplice and 26 km (16 mi) west of Ústí nad Labem, on the border with Germany. It lies in the Ore Mountains. There are several peaks with an altitude of 800 m and more in the municipal territory; the highest of them is Oldřišský vrch at 878 m (2,881 ft). The Freiberger Mulde and Wild Weißeritz rivers originate in the municipal territory.

== History ==
The first written mention of Moldava is from 1346, when there was built probably a wooden church. The village of Nové Město was first mentioned in 1341. In 1560, silver was mined here, but the mining soon stopped. In the 1960s, the municipalities of Moldava and Nové Město merged.

== Demographics ==
Historical population

Year	Pop.	±%
1869	1,774	—
1880	1,697	−4.3%
1890	1,890	+11.4%
1900	1,963	+3.9%
1910	2,001	+1.9%

Year	Pop.	±%
1921	1,809	−9.6%
1930	1,841	+1.8%
1950	489	−73.4%
1961	178	−63.6%
1970	149	−16.3%

Year	Pop.	±%
1980	148	−0.7%
1991	123	−16.9%
2001	141	+14.6%
2011	214	+51.8%
2021	172	−19.6%

Source: Censuses

== Transport ==
Moldava is the terminus of the railway lines from Ústí nad Labem and from Most, but they are only in operation on weekends. The municipality is served by two train stops named Moldava v Krušných horách and Mikulov-Nové Město.

== Sport ==
There is a ski resort on the Bouřňák mountain near Nové Město.

== Sights ==
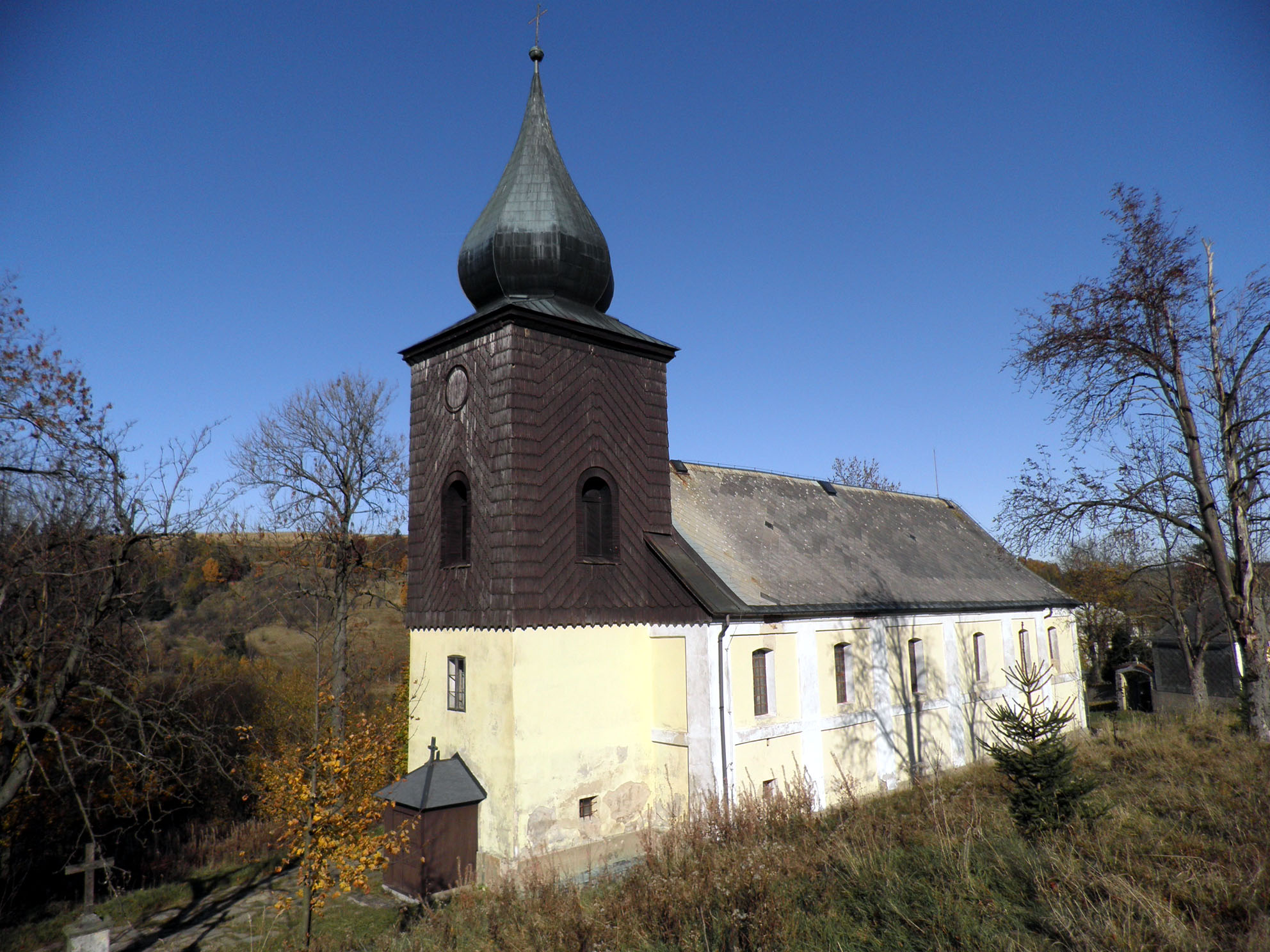
Church of the Visitation of the Virgin Mary

The current Church of the Visitation of the Virgin Mary was built in the Baroque style in 1687. Neoclassical modifications were made in 1851.
