= Zaufensgraben =

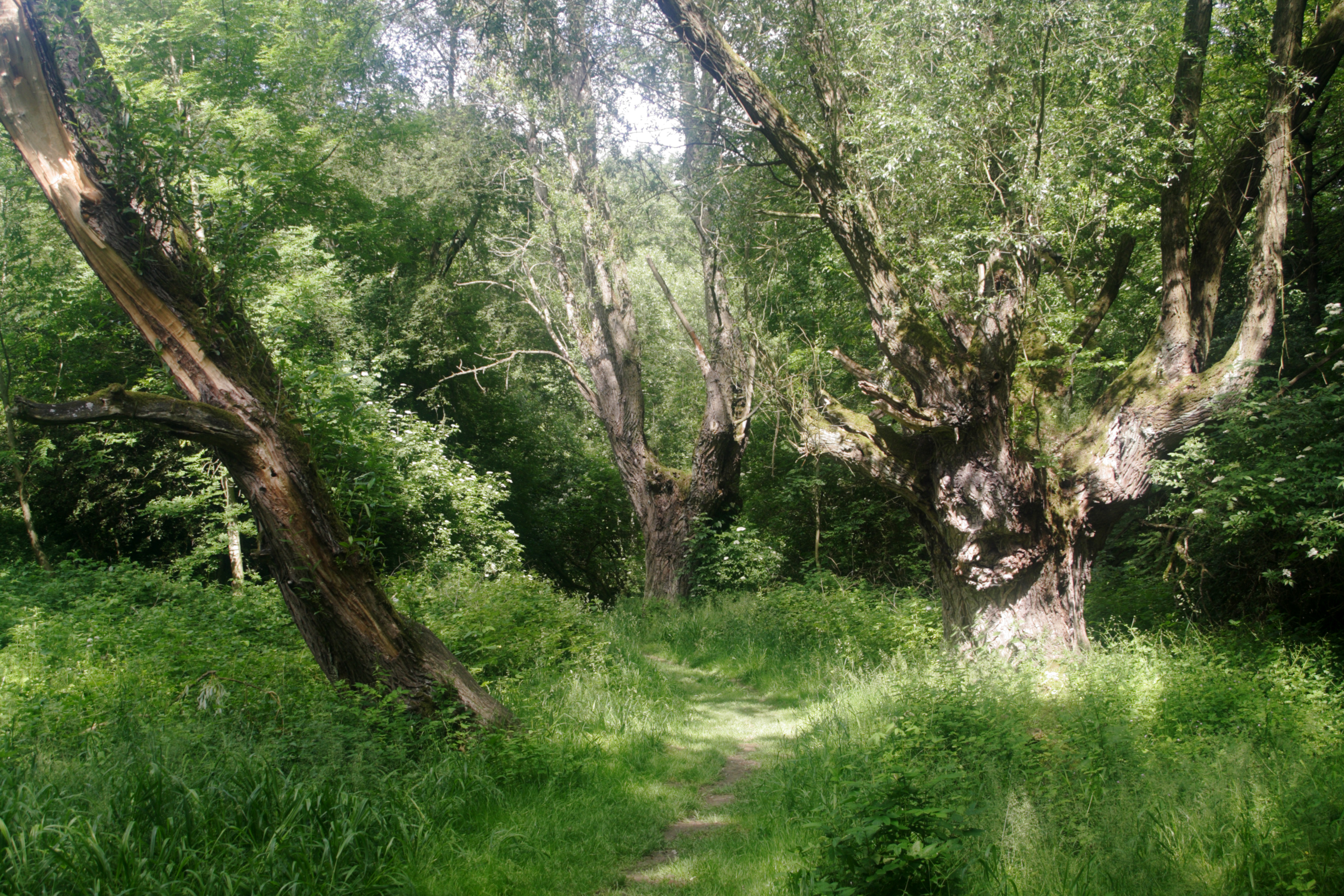

Location
- Country: Germany
- State: Thuringia

Physical characteristics
- Mouth
  - location: Gessenbach
  - coordinates: 50.8616°N 12.0842°E

Basin features
- Progression: Gessenbach→ White Elster→ Saale→ Elbe→ North Sea

Zaufensgraben is a river of Thuringia, Germany. It flows into the Gessenbach in Gera.

== See also ==
- List of rivers of Thuringia
