= Výhledy =

- Village
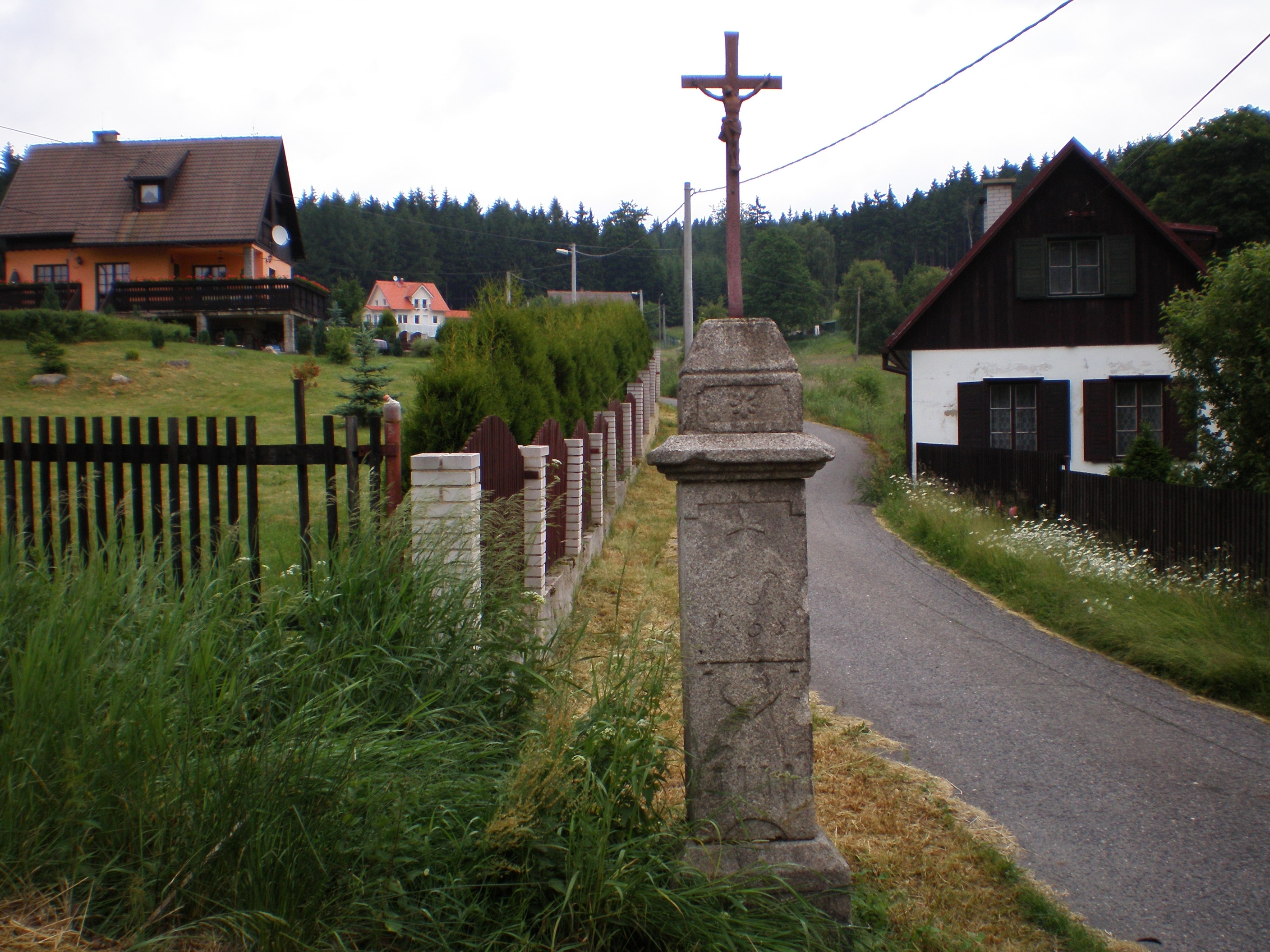
- Interactive map of Výhledy
- Location within Czech Republic
- Coordinates: 50°11′22″N 12°16′6″E
- Country: Czech Republic
- Region: Karlovy Vary
- District: Cheb
- Municipality: Hazlov
- First mentioned: 1224

Area
  - Total: 3.81 km^{2} (1.47 sq mi)
- Elevation: 687 m (2,254 ft)

Population (2021)
  - Total: 78
  - Density: 20/km^{2} (53/sq mi)
- Time zone: UTC+1 (CET)
  - Summer (DST): UTC+2 (CEST)
- Postal code: 35132

Výhledy (German: Steingrün) is a village in Karlovy Vary Region, Czech Republic. It is one of the six municipality districts of Hazlov. In 2021, the village had a population of 78.

== Demographics ==
In 1921, its population was at 494.

== Geography ==
Výhledy lies 4 kilometres north of Hazlov, about 687 meters above sea level. It is surrounded by forests. It neighbour Skalka to the south and Nebesa and Nový Žďár to the southwest. To the west and the east, there is the German border.

A spring of Bílý Halštrov river is located over the village.

== History ==
Skalka was first mentioned in 1224. In 1526 the village was bought by the Šlik. From 1629, the village was part of Hazlov, and in 1850 it created its municipality with the village Neuengrün (which no longer exists).

In the 14th century, a small stronghold was located in the village but was destroyed a long time ago. In 1890 a modern (at that time) school was built here, but it is no longer used.

== Landmarks ==
- Calvary with Most Holy Trinity motive,
- iron crucifix,
- World War I memorial (in very bad condition).

== Gallery ==
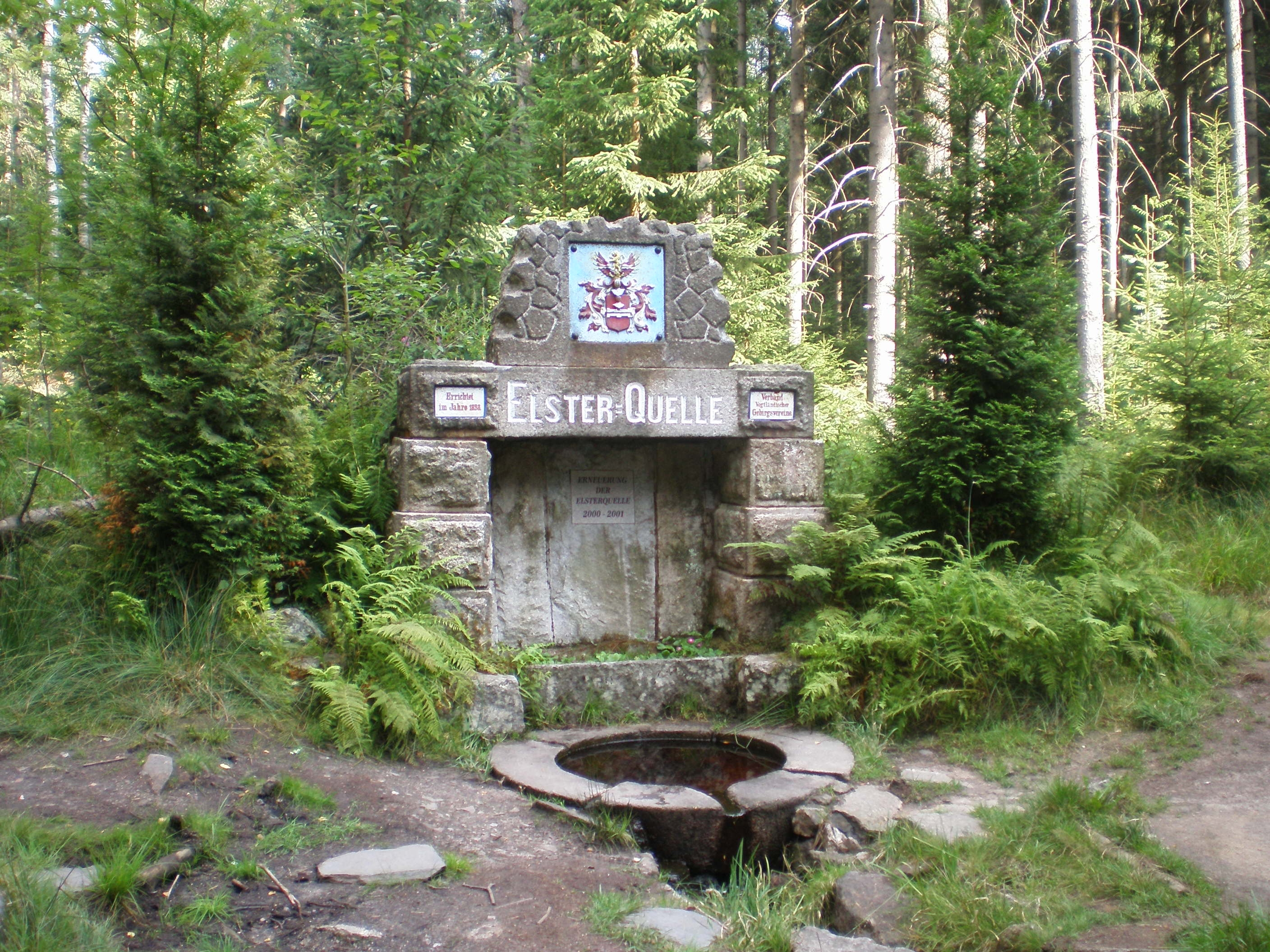
A spring of Bílý Halštrov.

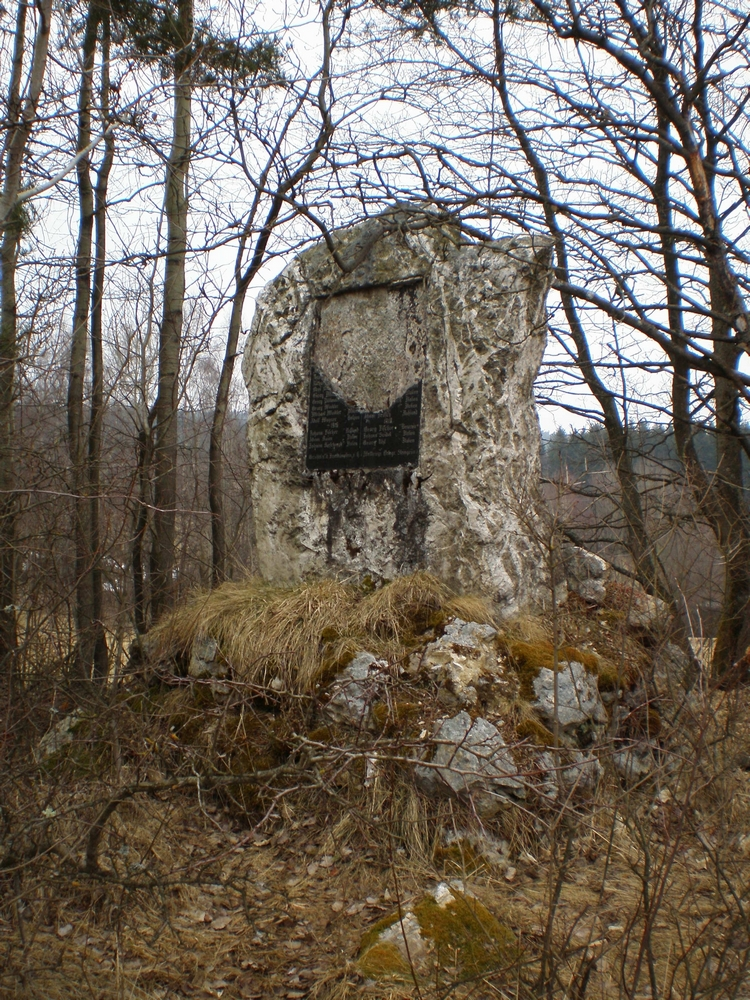
WW1 memorial.
