= Kabelske =

River in Germany

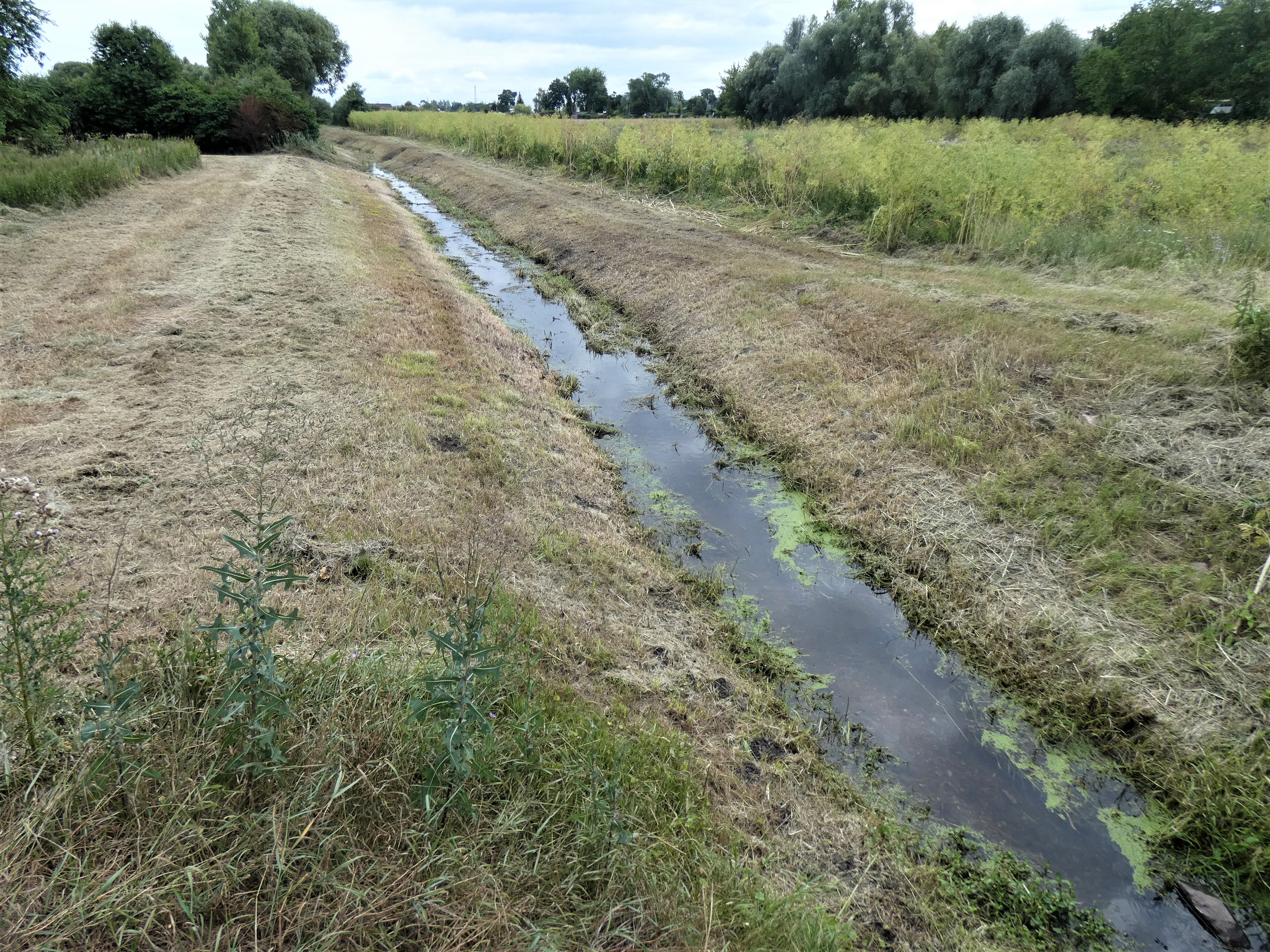

Location
- Country: Germany
- States: Saxony; Saxony-Anhalt
- Districts: Nordsachsen; Saalekreis
- City: Halle (Saale)

Physical characteristics
- Source
  - location: near Halle-Leipzig Airport
  - elevation: 121 m
- Mouth
  - location: Reide near Halle-Kanena
  - coordinates: 51.4579°N 12.0412°E
  - elevation: 91 m
- Length: 13.75 km (8.54 mi)

Basin features
- Progression: Reide→ White Elster→ Saale→ Elbe→ North Sea
- Landmarks: Small towns: Schkeuditz; Villages: Kabelsketal

The Kabelske (German pronunciation: [kaˈbɛlskə]) is a river in the German states of Saxony and Saxony-Anhalt. It is a left tributary of the Reide, and flows through the counties of Nordsachsen and Saalekreis, as well as the eastern part of the borough of Halle (Saale) in southern Saxony-Anhalt.

Its source is a reservoir on the western edge of Leipzig-Halle Airport in the cadastral municipality of Schkeuditz in Nordsachsen. It then flows northwest, passes under the A 9 motorway and the Erfurt–Leipzig/Halle high-speed railway line near Gröbers.

Its waters flow almost entirely on the territory of the eponymous unitary municipality of Kabelsketal with its villages of Beuditz, Schwoitsch, Benndorf and Naundorf, until it reaches the Halle city quarter of Kanena, where it empties into the Reide from the left. The Reide, in turn, discharges into the White Elster near Osendorf after another 6.5 km (4.0 mi).

== See also ==
- List of rivers of Saxony
- List of rivers of Saxony-Anhalt

== Literature ==
- Hans-Werner Sonntag; Manfred Döll; René Zimmer (1999), Reide und Kabelske. Eine Bachlandschaft im Fluß der Zeiten (in German), Halle (Saale): Unabhängiges Institut für Umweltfragen e.V., ISBN 3-00-005099-X
