= Vlastislav =

Vlastislav may refer to:

- Vlastislav (given name), a Czech given name
- Vlastislav (mythological prince), Slavic mythological prince
- Vlastislav (Litoměřice District), a municipality and village in the Czech Republic
- Vlastislav (Hazlov), a village and part of Hazlov in the Czech Republic
