= Großkugel station =

Railway station in Kabelsketal, Germany

Großkugel
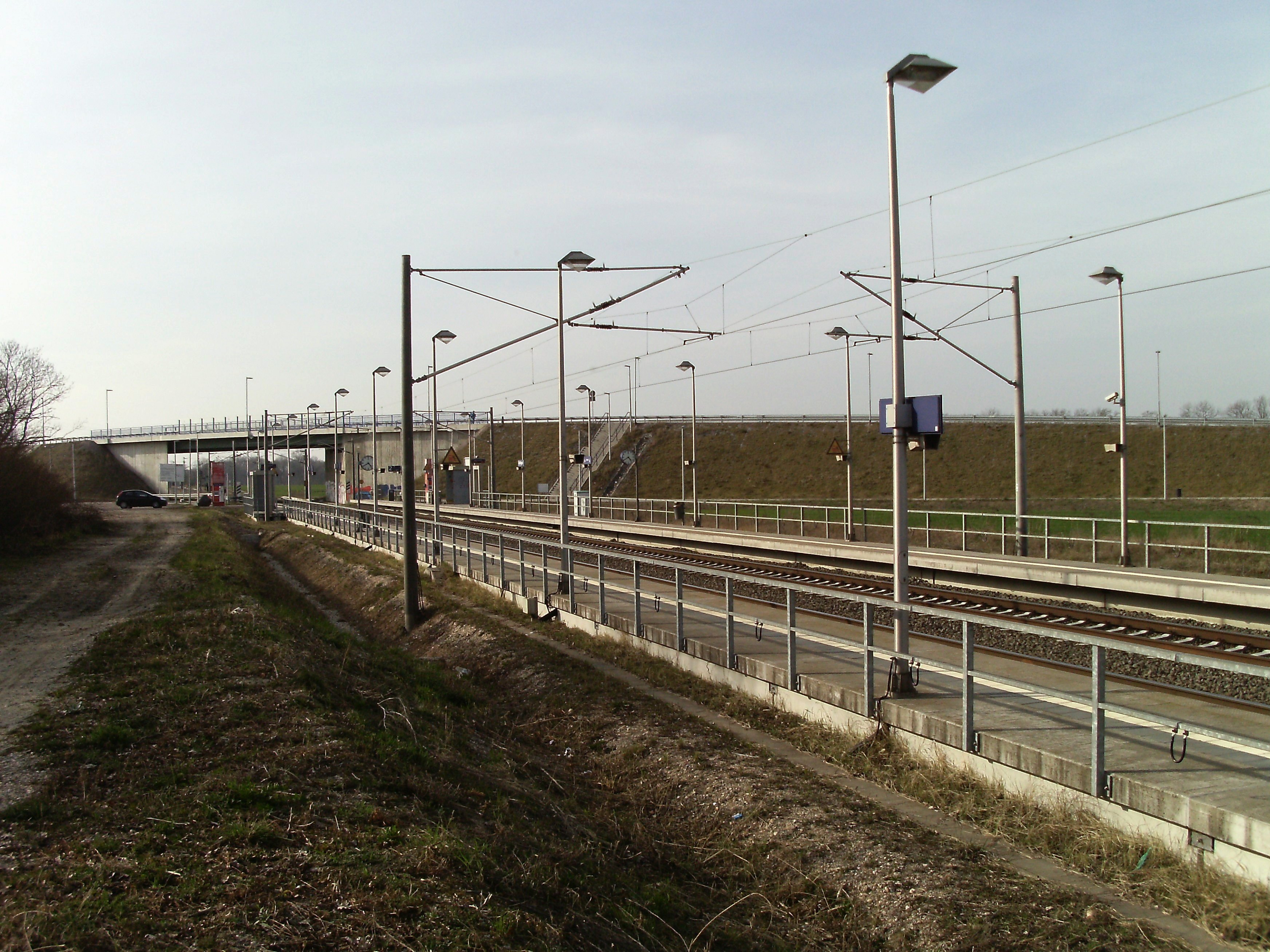
- 2012

General information
- Location: Glesiener Straße; 06184 Kabelsketal; Saxony-Anhalt; Germany
- Coordinates: 51.4185°N 12.1653°E
- System: Hp
- Owner: DB Netz
- Operator: DB Station&Service
- Lines: Magdeburg–Leipzig railway (KBS 340)
- Platforms: 2 side platforms
- Tracks: 2
- Train operators: S-Bahn Mitteldeutschland

Other information
- Station code: 2353
- DS100 code: LGKL
- IBNR: 8011752
- Category: 6
- Fare zone: MDV: 163
- Website: www.bahnhof.de

Services
Preceding station	Mitteldeutschland S-Bahn	Following station
Gröbers towards Halle-Nietleben	S 3	Schkeuditz West towards Wurzen or Oschatz
Location
- Location within Saxony-Anhalt

Großkugel station is a railway station in the Großkugel district in the municipality of Kabelsketal, located in the Saalekreis district in Saxony-Anhalt, Germany.

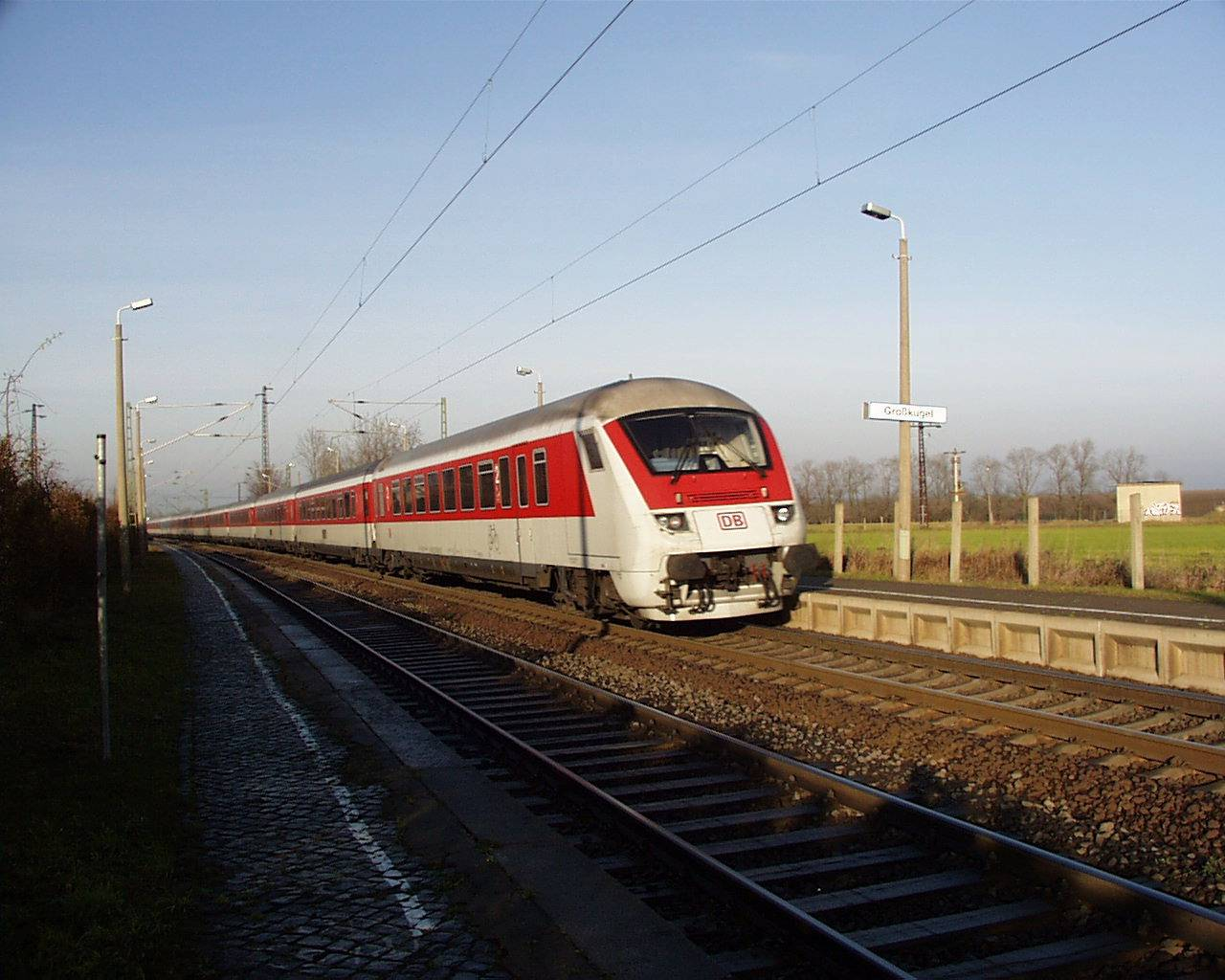
DB InterCity passing Großkugel station (December 2000).

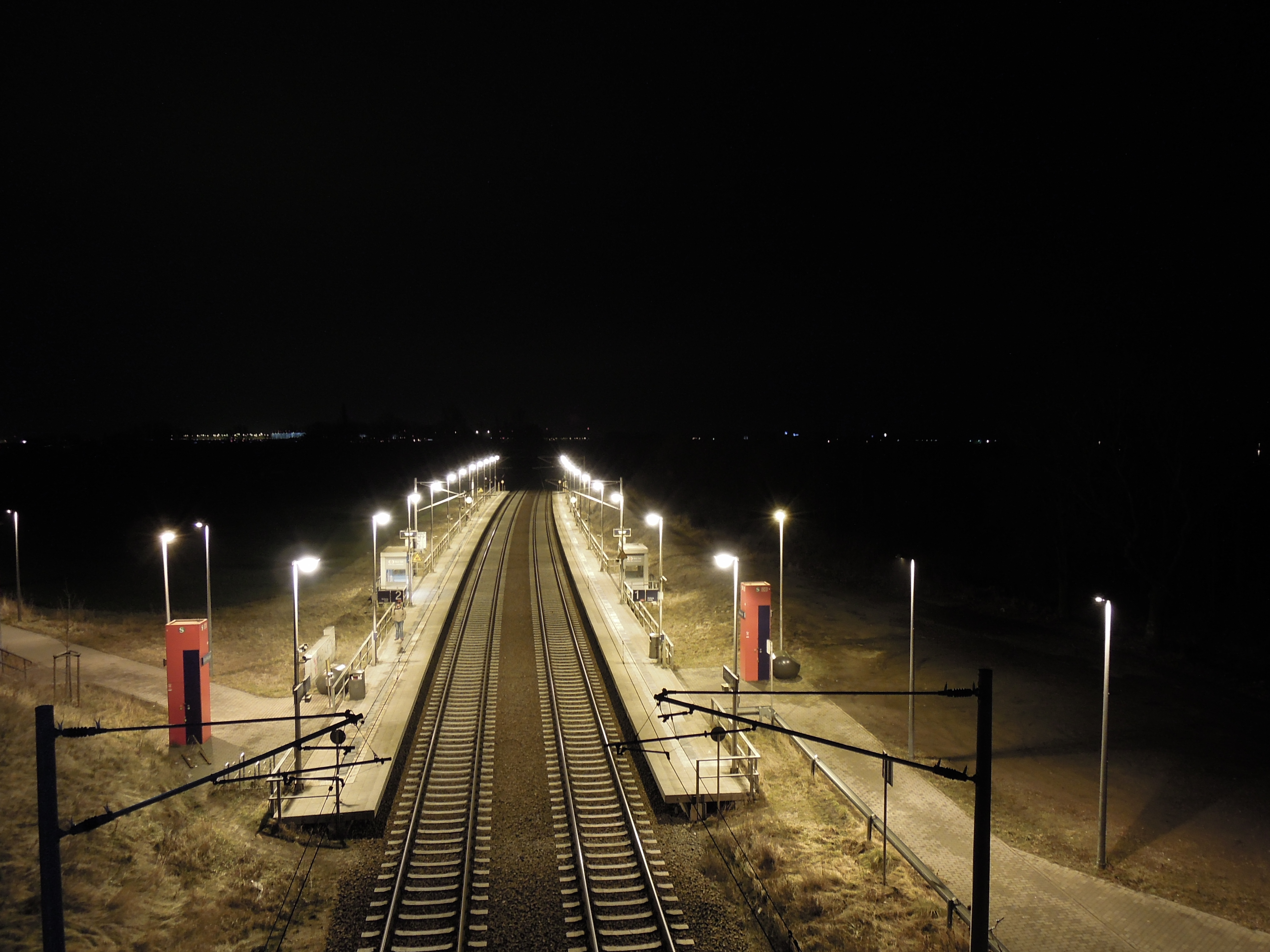
Großkugel station at night (2015).
