= Polná (Hazlov) =

- Village
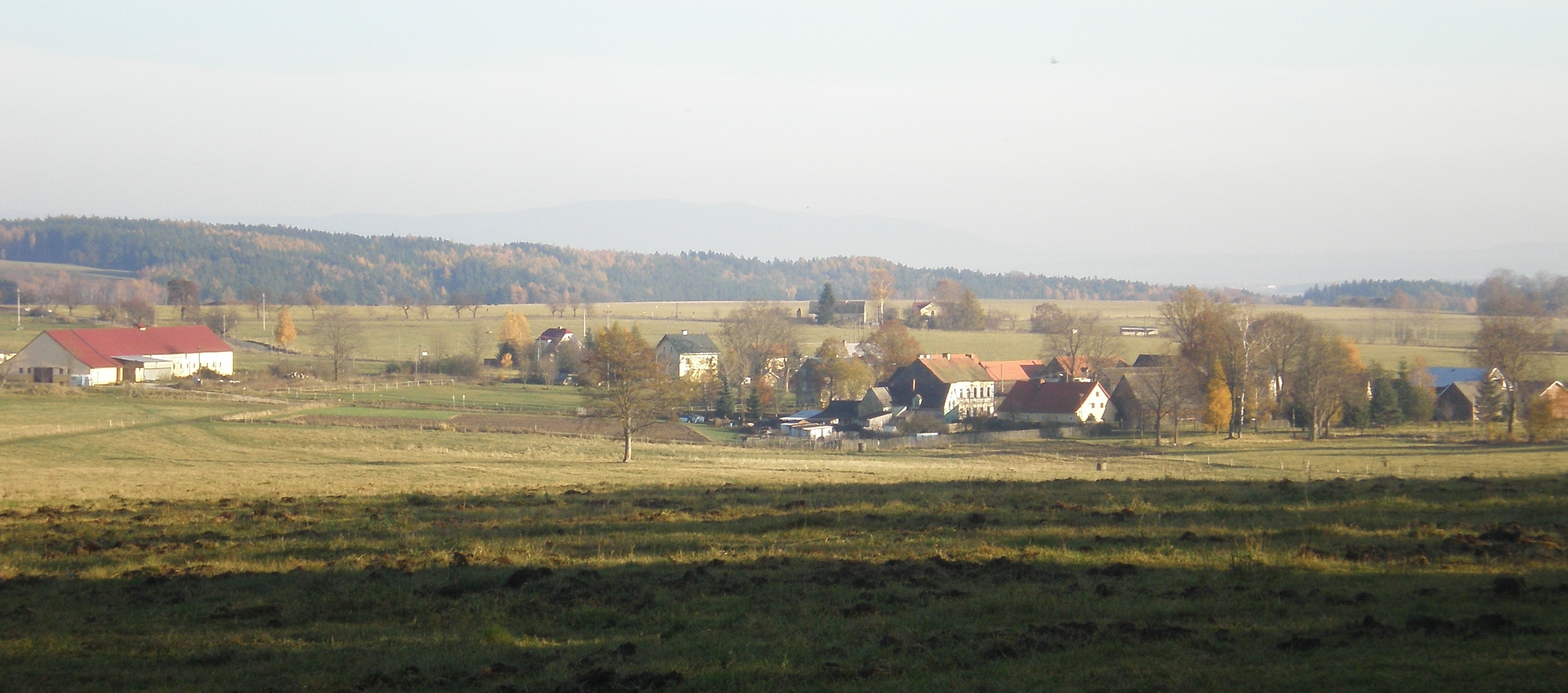
- Interactive map of Polná
- Coordinates: 50°9′9″N 12°14′42″E
- Country: Czech Republic
- Region: Karlovy Vary
- District: Cheb
- Municipality: Hazlov
- First mentioned: 1307

Area
  - Total: 7.83 km^{2} (3.02 sq mi)
- Elevation: 535 m (1,755 ft)

Population (2001)
  - Total: 45
  - Density: 5.7/km^{2} (15/sq mi)
- Time zone: UTC+1 (CET)
  - Summer (DST): UTC+2 (CEST)
- Postal code: 35132

Polná (German: Hirschfeld) is a village in Karlovy Vary Region, Czech Republic. It is one of the six municipality districts of Hazlov. In 2021 the village had a population of 58.

== Geography ==
Polná lies 2.5 kilometres southwest from Hazlov, about 535 meters above sea level. It is surrounded by forests. It neighbour with Hazlov to the east, with Lipná to the north, with Táborská to the southeast and with Libá to the southwest. To the west there is the German border.

== Demographics ==
In 1921, its population was 286.

== Landmarks ==
- Frame house from 1792, with Virgin Mary painting and with a chapel,
- two crucifix,
- conciliation cross.

== Gallery ==
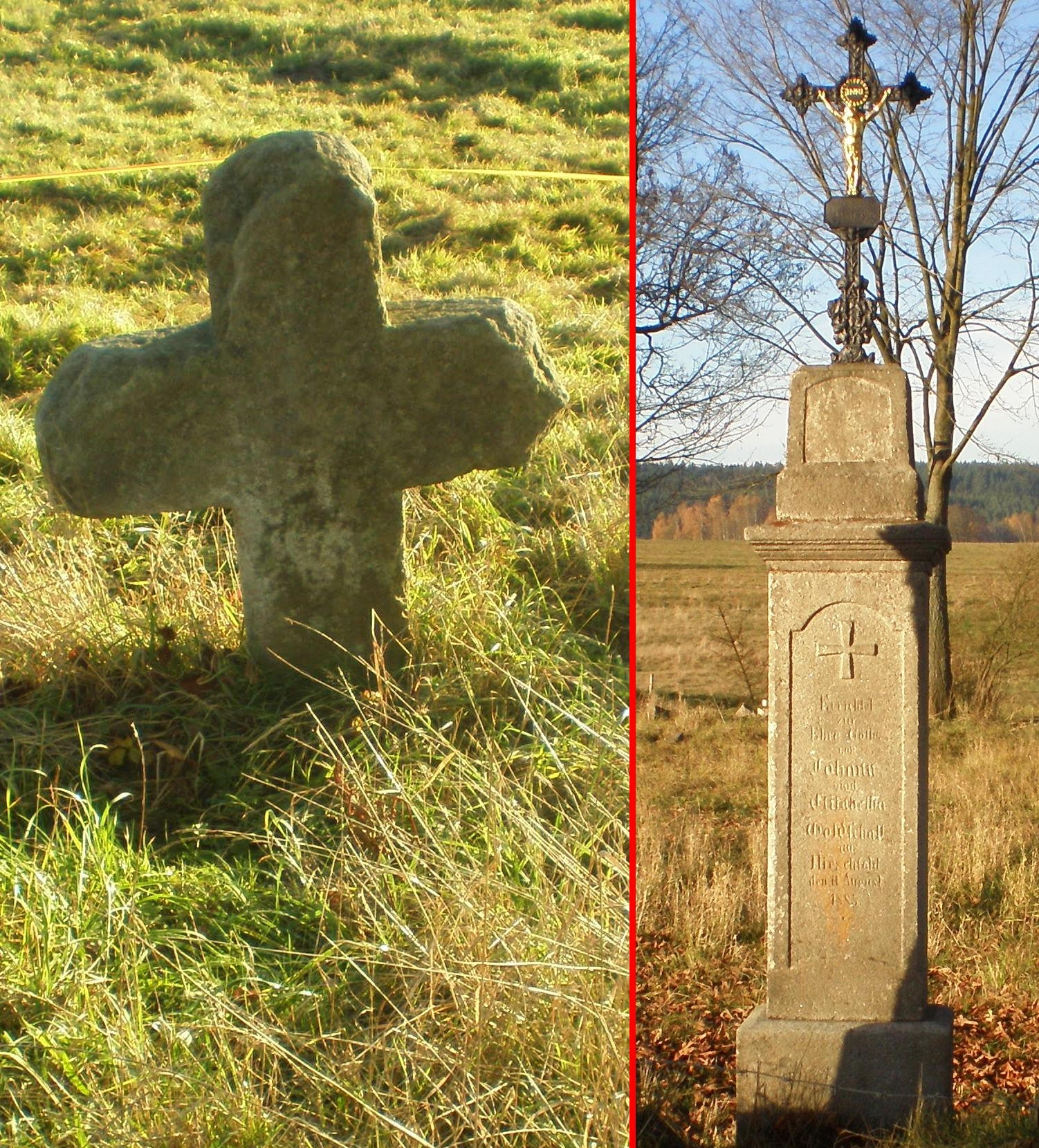
Conciliation cross and crucifix.

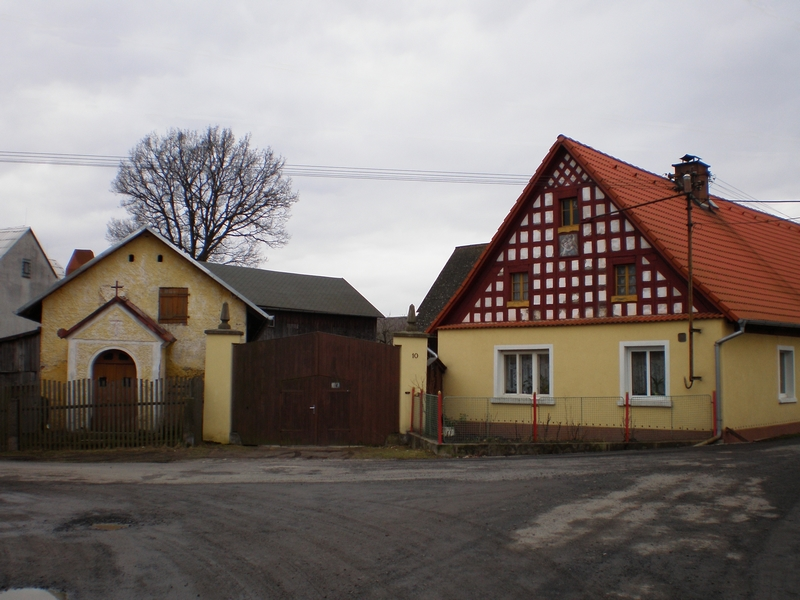
Frame house with chapel.
