= Lipná (Hazlov) =

- Village
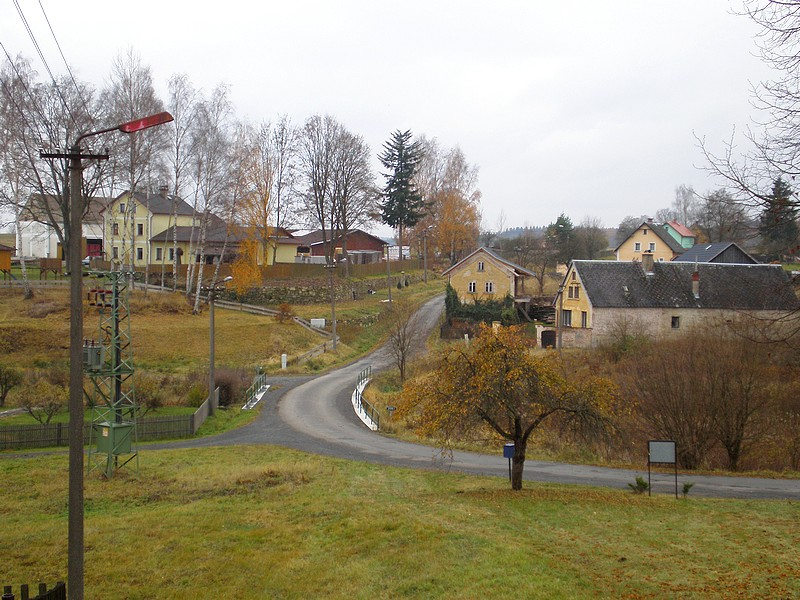
- General view

- Location in the Czech Republic
- Coordinates: 50°9′31″N 12°15′4″E
- Country: Czech Republic
- Region: Karlovy Vary
- District: Cheb
- Municipality: Hazlov
- First mentioned: 1307

Area
  - Total: 1.79 km^{2} (0.69 sq mi)
- Elevation: 530 m (1,740 ft)

Population (2021)
  - Total: 24
  - Density: 13/km^{2} (35/sq mi)
- Time zone: UTC+1 (CET)
  - Summer (DST): UTC+2 (CEST)
- Postal code: 351 52

Lipná (until 1948 Lindov; German: Lindau) is a village and municipal part of Hazlov in Cheb District in the Karlovy Vary Region of the Czech Republic. It has about 20 inhabitants.

== Etymology ==
The initial German name Lindau and the Czech name Lindov were derived from the High German words linde ('linden') and ouwe ('water', 'stream', 'wet meadow'). The modern name Lipná is derived from the word lípa, which also means 'linden'.

== Geography ==
Lipná is located in the western part of the territory of Hazlov, about 12 kilometres (7 mi) northwest of Cheb and 43 km (27 mi) west of Karlovy Vary. It lies in the Fichtel Mountains. The stream Slatinný potok flows through the area.

== History ==
The first written mention of Lindov is from 1307.

In 1948, the name of the village was changed to Lipná. Between 1910 and 1950, it was an independent municipality, but then it was annexed to Polná. From 1961, Polná and Lipná are municipal parts of Hazlov.

== Demographics ==
Historical population

Year	Pop.	±%
1869	285	—
1880	268	−6.0%
1890	278	+3.7%
1900	274	−1.4%
1910	271	−1.1%

Year	Pop.	±%
1921	236	−12.9%
1930	270	+14.4%
1950	81	−70.0%
1961	53	−34.6%
1970	46	−13.2%

Year	Pop.	±%
1980	19	−58.7%
1991	10	−47.4%
2001	15	+50.0%
2011	22	+46.7%
2021	24	+9.1%

Source: Censuses

== Economy ==
Lipná is known for a stone quarry.

== Sights ==
There are no protected cultural monuments in the Lipná area.
