= Gessenbach =

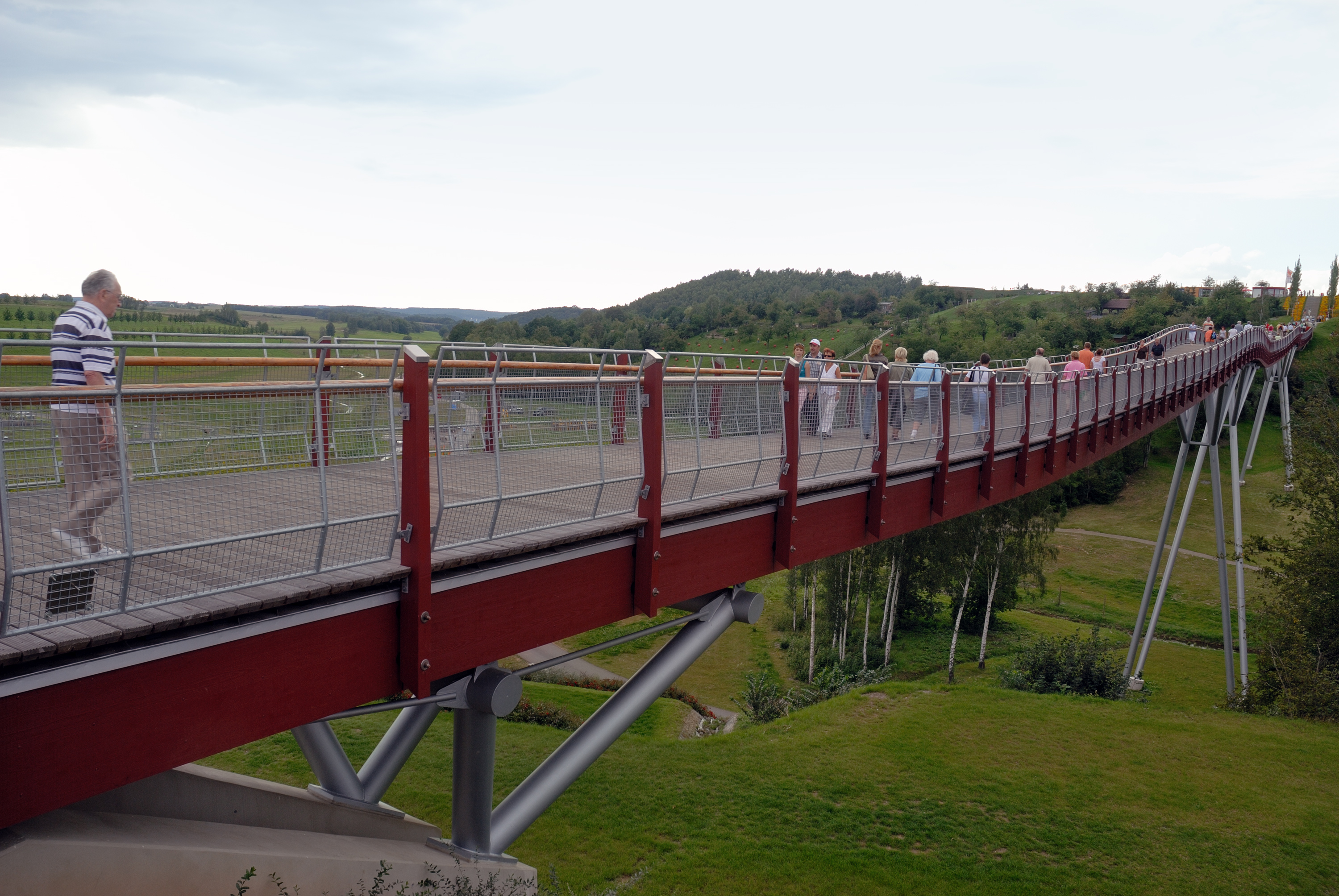

Location
- Country: Germany
- States: Thuringia

Physical characteristics
- Mouth
  - location: White Elster
  - coordinates: 50.8633°N 12.0792°E

Basin features
- Progression: White Elster→ Saale→ Elbe→ North Sea

Gessenbach is a river of Thuringia, Germany. It flows into the White Elster in the city Gera.

== See also ==
- List of rivers of Thuringia
