= Schwarzbach (White Elster) =

River in Germany

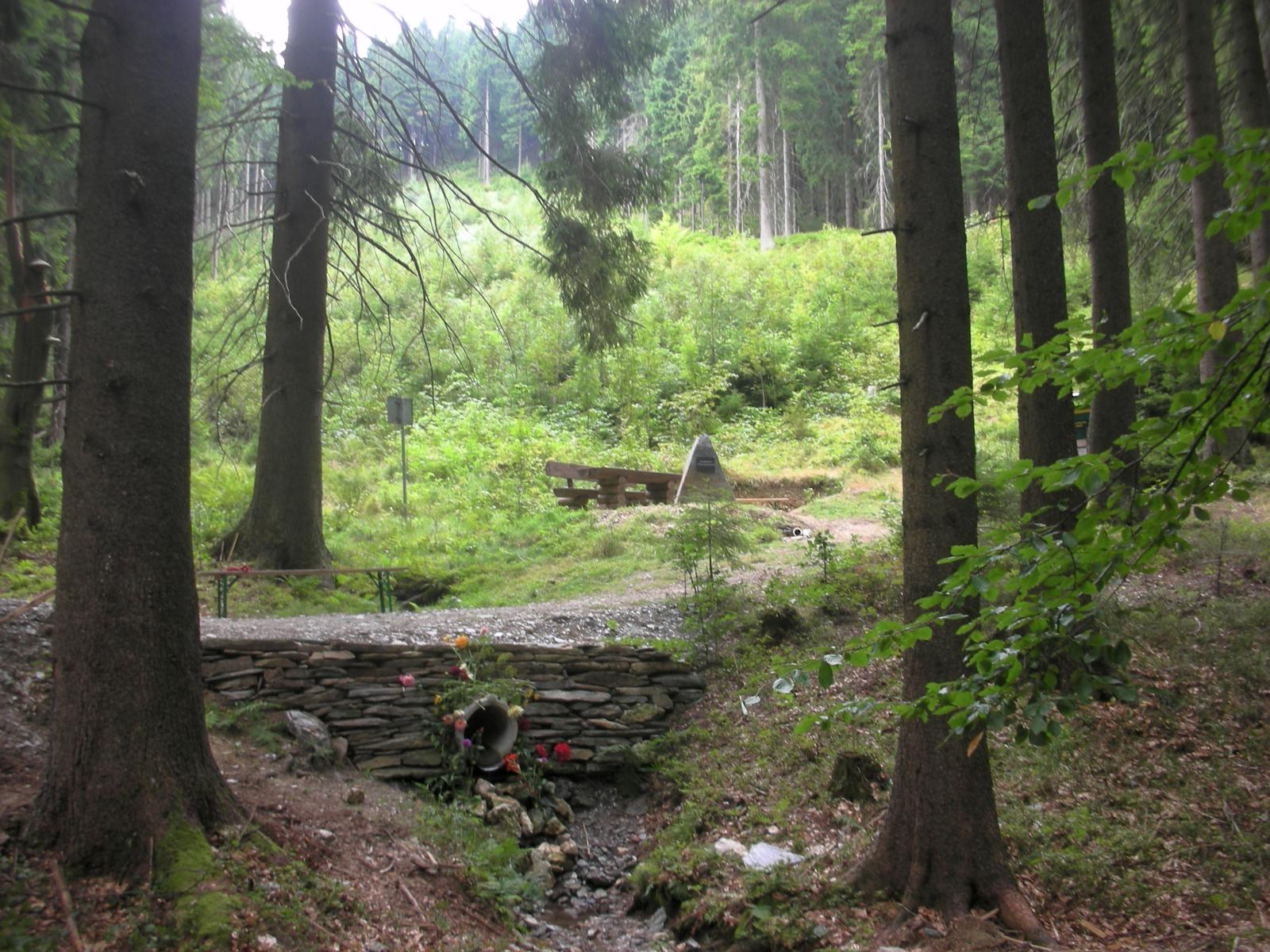

Location
- Country: Germany
- States: Saxony

Physical characteristics
- Mouth
  - location: White Elster
  - coordinates: 50.3211°N 12.2572°E

Basin features
- Progression: White Elster→ Saale→ Elbe→ North Sea

The Schwarzbach (German pronunciation: [ˈʃvaʁtsˌbax]) is a river of Saxony, Germany. It is a right tributary of the White Elster, which it joins in Adorf.

== See also ==
- List of rivers of Saxony
