= Hazlov =

- Municipality
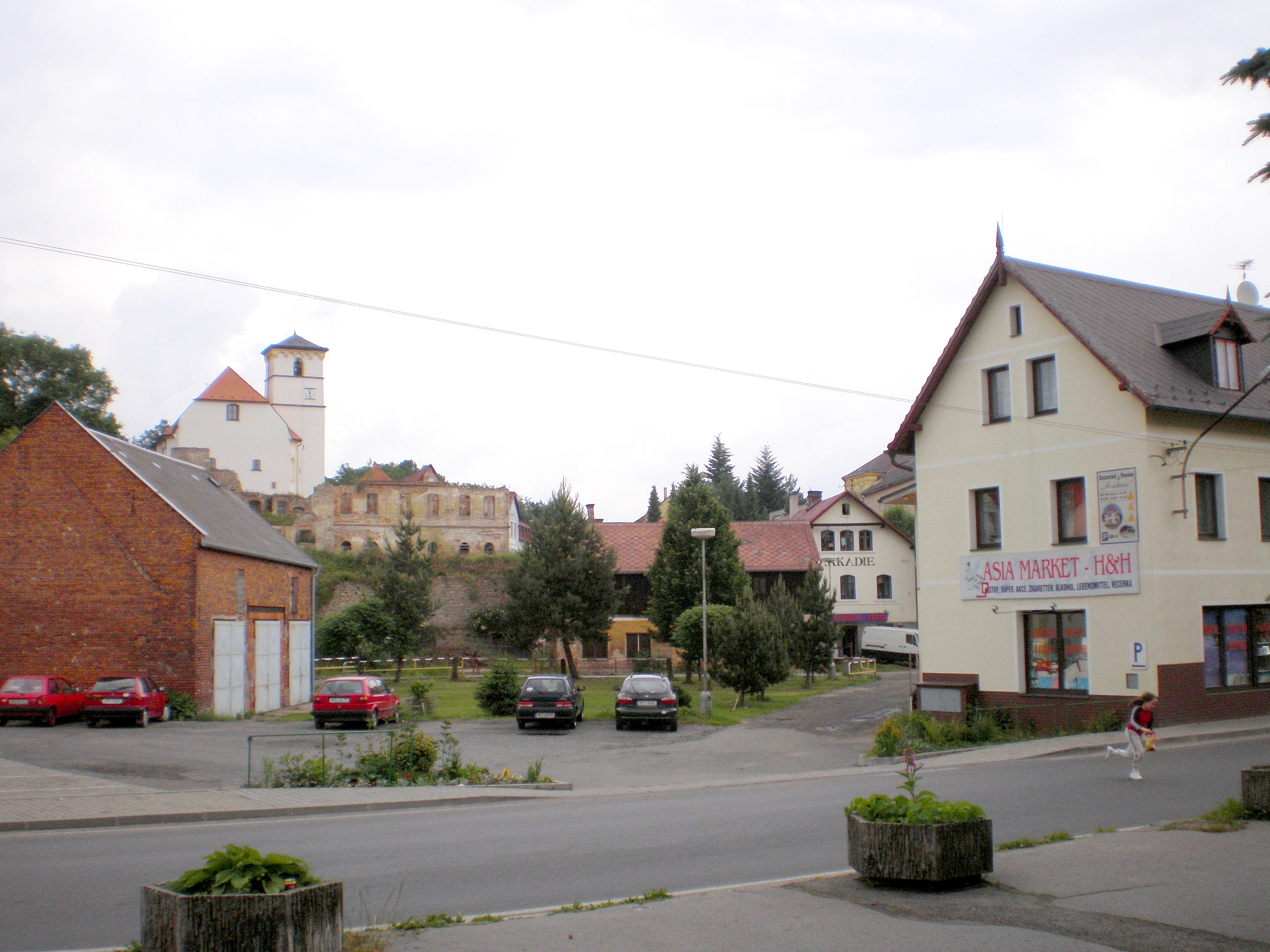
- Centre of Hazlov

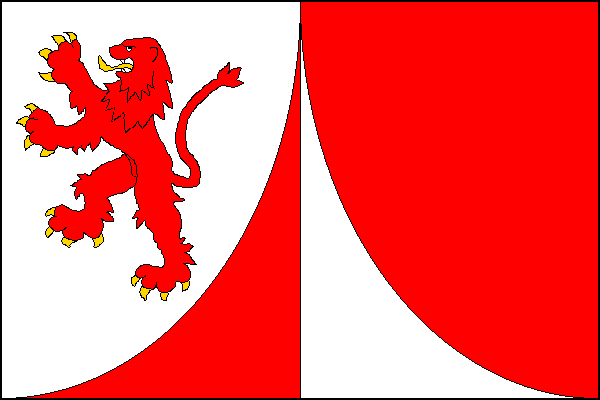
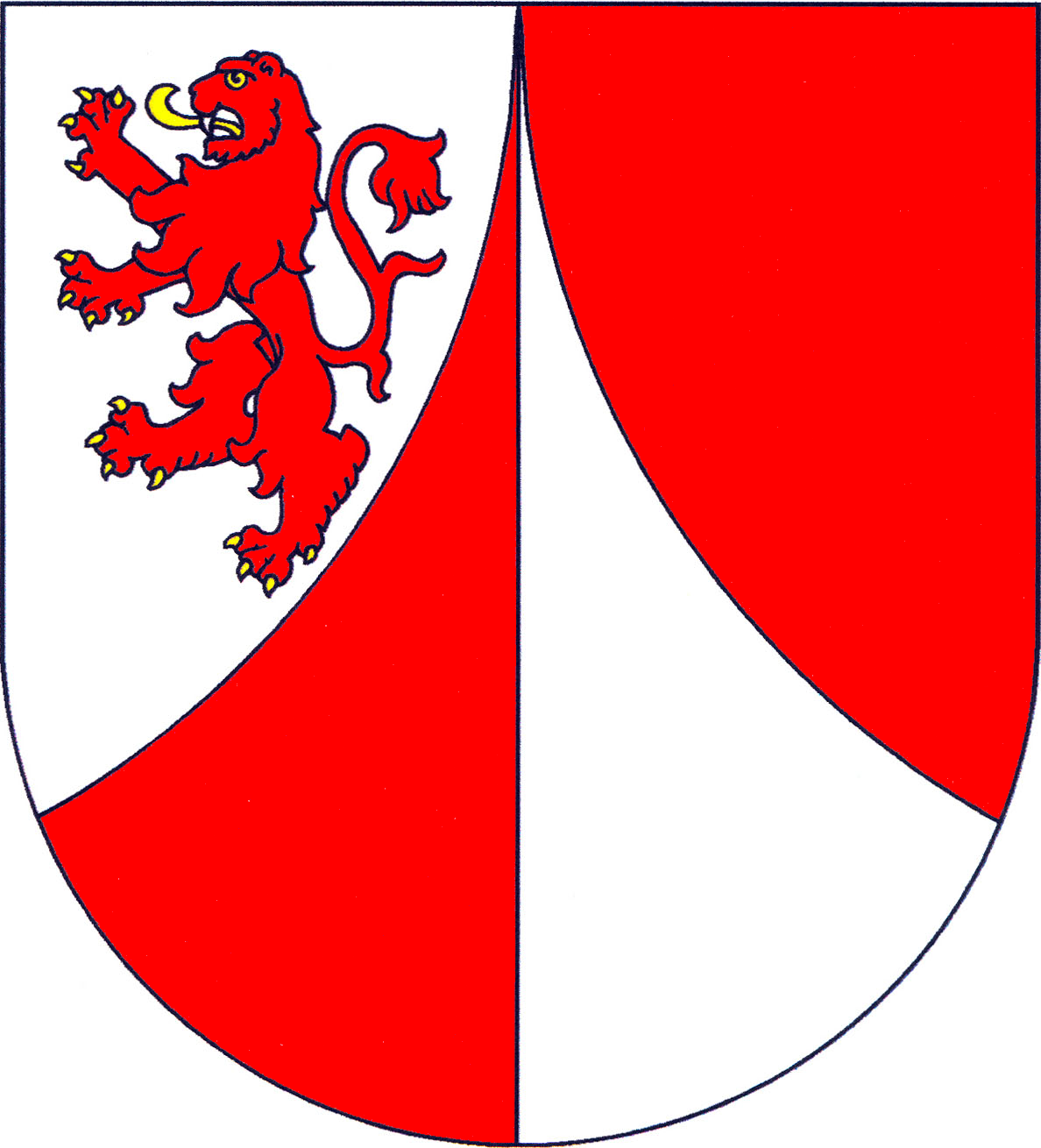
- Flag Coat of arms

- Location in the Czech Republic
- Coordinates: 50°9′23″N 12°16′21″E
- Country: Czech Republic
- Region: Karlovy Vary
- District: Cheb
- First mentioned: 1224

Area
  - Total: 27.88 km^{2} (10.76 sq mi)
- Elevation: 550 m (1,800 ft)

Population (2026-01-01)
  - Total: 1,507
  - Density: 54.05/km^{2} (140.0/sq mi)
- Time zone: UTC+1 (CET)
  - Summer (DST): UTC+2 (CEST)
- Postal code: 351 32
- Website: www.obechazlov.cz

Hazlov (German: Haslau) is a municipality and village in Cheb District in the Karlovy Vary Region of the Czech Republic. It has about 1,500 inhabitants.

== Administrative division ==
Hazlov consists of six municipal parts (in brackets population according to the 2021 census):

- Hazlov (1,273)
- Lipná (24)
- Polná (58)
- Skalka (25)
- Vlastislav (34)
- Výhledy (78)

== Etymology ==
The initial German name of Hazlov was Haselach. The name was derived from the German word Hasel (i.e 'hazel') and the suffix -ach, denoting a stream. So it was originally the name of a stream flowing between hazel bushes, which was transferred to the settlement. The name soon evolved to Hasla and in the 18th century to Haslau. The Czech name was created by transcription.

== Geography ==
Hazlov is located about 11 kilometres (7 mi) northwest of Cheb and 42 km (26 mi) west of Karlovy Vary, in the Aš Panhandle region. It borders Germany in the northeast and west. The municipality lies in the Fichtel Mountains. The highest point is at 742 m (2,434 ft) above sea level. The stream Hazlovský potok flows through the municipality. The source of the White Elster River is located in the northernmost part of the municipal territory.

== History ==
The first written mention of Hazlov is from 1224, when Bedřich of Hazlov was mentioned. He probably had built the castle in the village. The Lords of Hazlov owned the village until 1401, when it bought Mikuláš Jur of Cheb. Other owners of the village were the Landwüst family from 1450, the Kocov family from 1579, the Dětřichov family, and for a short time the Nostitz family. The next owners were the Moser family (1683–1795), who had rebuilt and extended the castle. The last noble owners of the castle were the Helmfeld family (1853–1945).

Until the end of the 18th century, Hazlov was mostly an agricultural village. From the 19th century, the textile industry developed in the whole Aš region, including Hazlov. The first textile factory was opened in 1822.

== Demographics ==
Historical population

Year	Pop.	±%
1869	4,571	—
1880	4,704	+2.9%
1890	4,544	−3.4%
1900	4,471	−1.6%
1910	4,861	+8.7%

Year	Pop.	±%
1921	4,047	−16.7%
1930	4,751	+17.4%
1950	1,509	−68.2%
1961	1,583	+4.9%
1970	1,456	−8.0%

Year	Pop.	±%
1980	1,389	−4.6%
1991	1,365	−1.7%
2001	1,595	+16.8%
2011	1,573	−1.4%
2021	1,492	−5.1%

Source: Censuses

== Transport ==
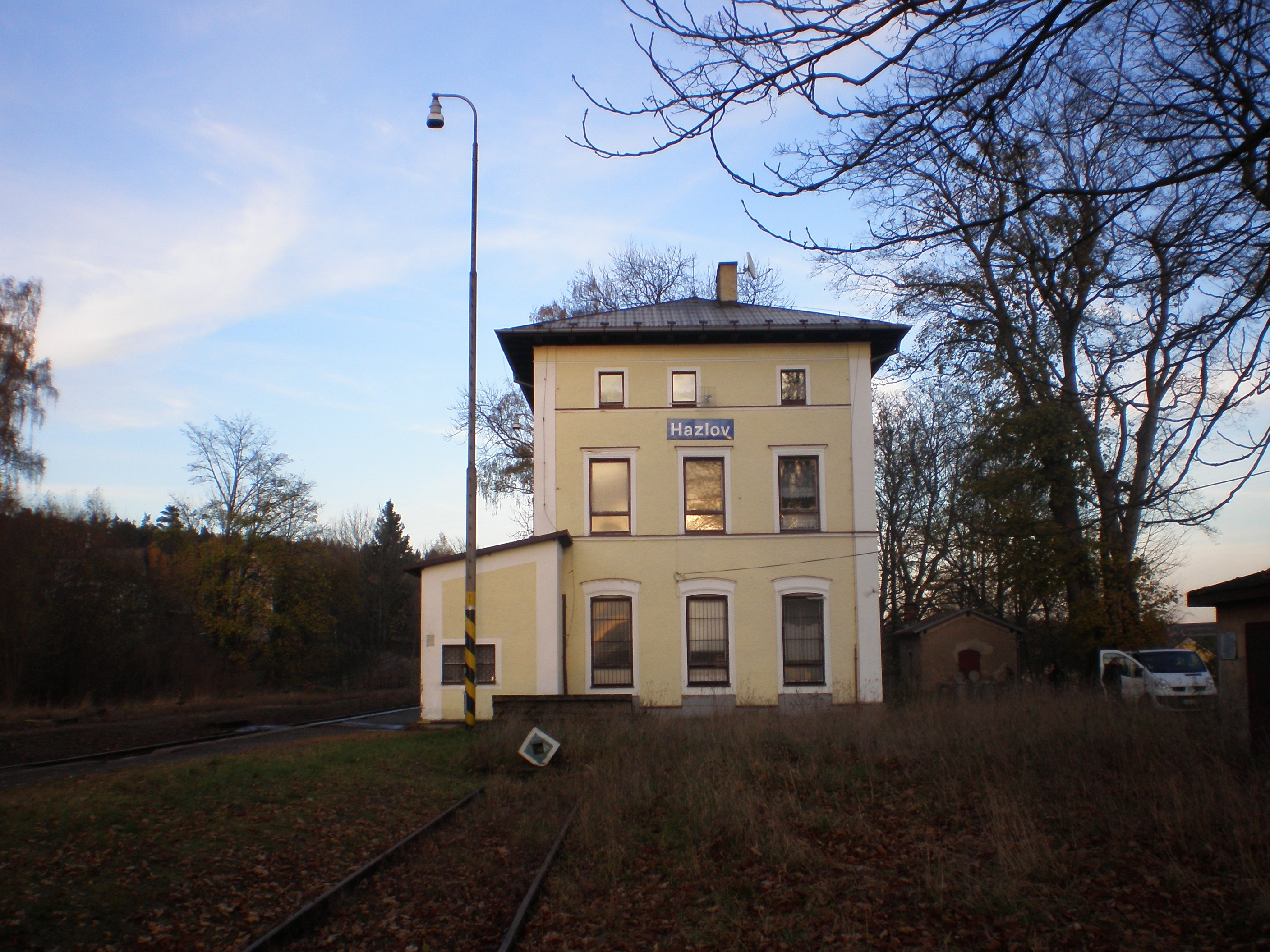
Railway station

The I/64 road from Františkovy Lázně to the Czech–German border in Aš runs through the municipality.

Hazlov is located on the railway line Hof–Marktredwitz via Cheb.

== Sights ==
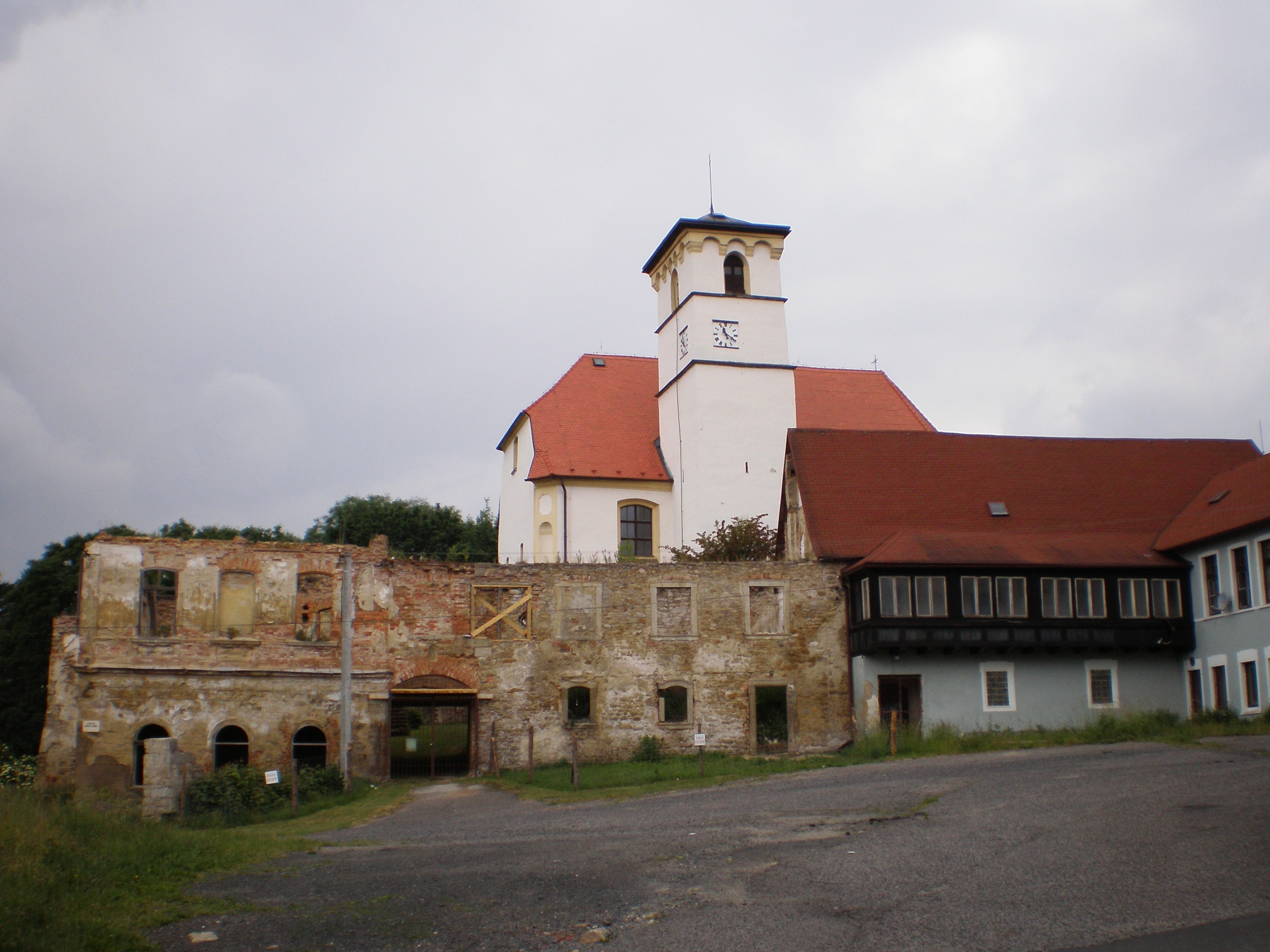
Hazlov Castle with the Church of the Exaltation of the Holy Cross

The main landmark of Hazlov is the Church of the Exaltation of the Holy Cross. The current building was built on the site of a demolished church in the Baroque style in 1687–1688.

The church is surrounded by the ruin of the Hazlov Castle. The originally Romanesque castle from the 13th century was rebuilt in the Gothic style, then it was rebuilt in the late Baroque and Neoclassical styles in the 1780s. The last modifications were made by the Helmfeld family after 1853. After World War II, it began to decay and today it is a ruin, owned by the municipality.

The Church of Saint George is a small cemetery church from 1666.
