= Reide =

River in Germany

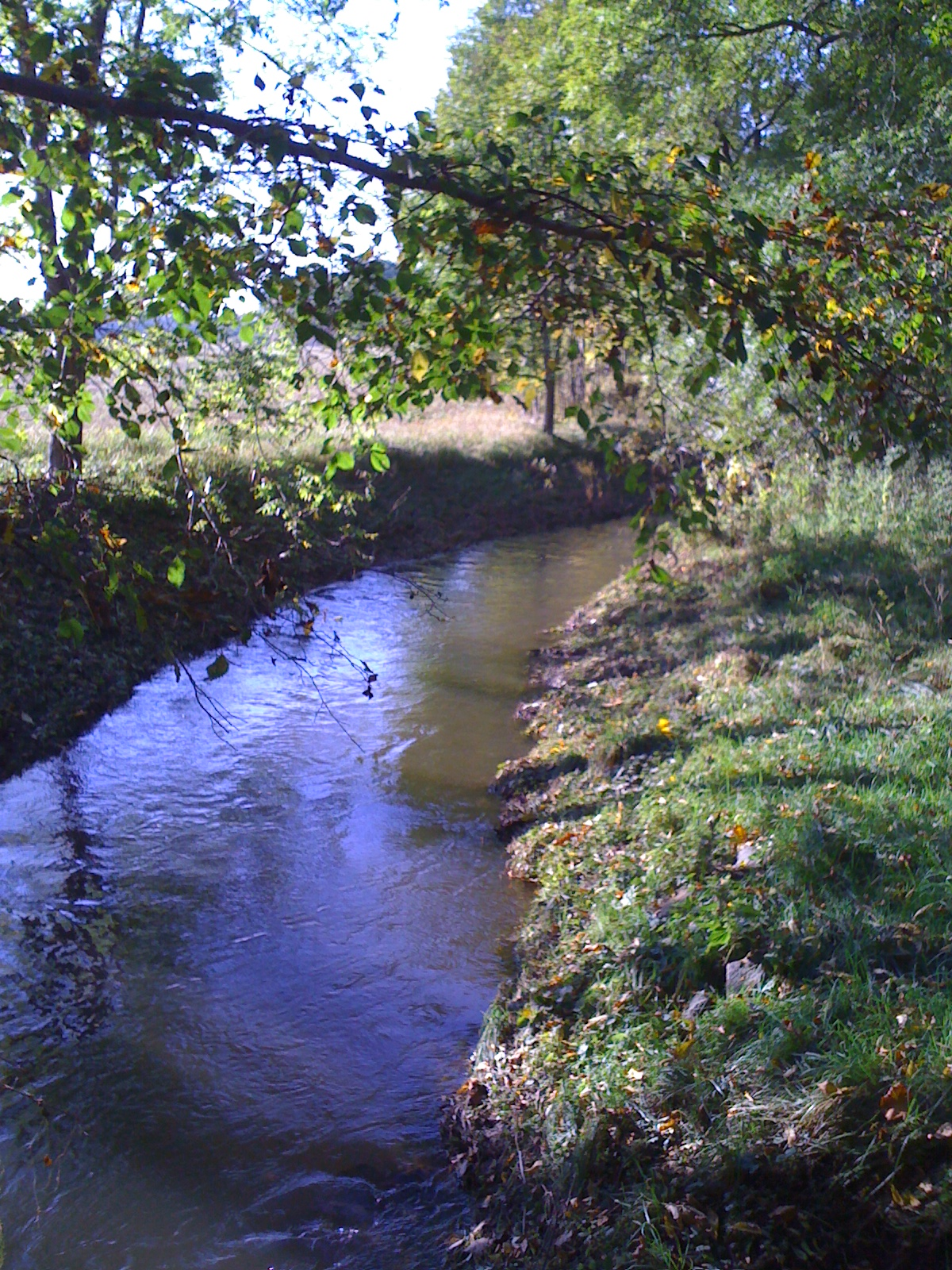

Location
- Country: Germany
- States: Saxony-Anhalt

Physical characteristics
- Mouth
  - location: White Elster
  - coordinates: 51.4152°N 12.0063°E

Basin features
- Progression: White Elster→ Saale→ Elbe→ North Sea
- Tributaries
  - left: Kabelske

The Reide (German pronunciation: [ˈʁaɪdə]) is a stream in the districts of Saalekreis and Halle (Saale) in the German state Saxony-Anhalt, Germany. It is a tributary of the White Elster, which it joins south of Halle.

== See also ==
- List of rivers of Saxony-Anhalt
