= Skalka (Hazlov) =

- Village
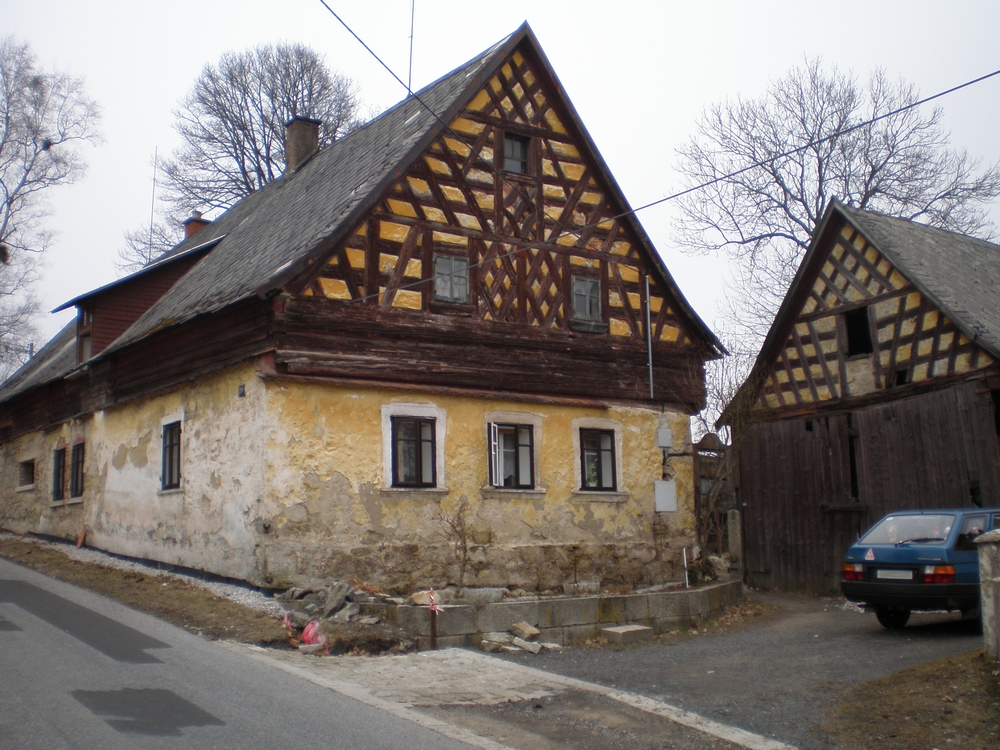
- Interactive map of Skalka
- Coordinates: 50°10′38″N 12°16′7″E
- Country: Czech Republic
- Region: Karlovy Vary
- District: Cheb
- Municipality: Hazlov
- First mentioned: 1224

Area
  - Total: 4.48 km^{2} (1.73 sq mi)
- Elevation: 612 m (2,008 ft)

Population (2001)
  - Total: 125
  - Density: 27.9/km^{2} (72.3/sq mi)
- Time zone: UTC+1 (CET)
  - Summer (DST): UTC+2 (CEST)
- Postal code: 35132

Skalka (German: Rommersreuth) is a village in Karlovy Vary Region, Czech Republic. It is one of the six municipality districts of Hazlov. In 2001, the village had a population of 125.

== Geography ==
Skalka lies 2 km north from Hazlov, about 612 meters above sea level. It is surrounded by forests. It is neighbours with Hazlov to the south and with Výhledy to the north. To the west and to the east there is the German border.

== History ==
Skalka was first mentioned in 1224. Until 1868, it was a part of Hazlov, but in 1868 it created its own municipality, with Otov (village, which does not exist anymore). Skalka was often visited by J. W. Goethe. Goethe researched flint rocks over the village, which was later named after him. Since 1961, Skalka is one of the six municipality districts of Hazlov.

== The name of the village ==
In Czech, Skalka is diminutive from Skála, which means Rock. The old German name, Rommersreuth, is a composite of Rommer (Rommer is a name) and Reuth, which means Glade or Clearing; Glade of Rommer. Johann Wolfgang Goethe connected the name Rommersreuth with Roman settlement, but that is wrong.

== Landmarks ==
- World War I memorial from 1925,
- Two iron crucifixs, one from 1856,
- Frame house,
- Goethovy skály (The rocks of Goethe)- flint rocks, natural monument.

== Gallery ==
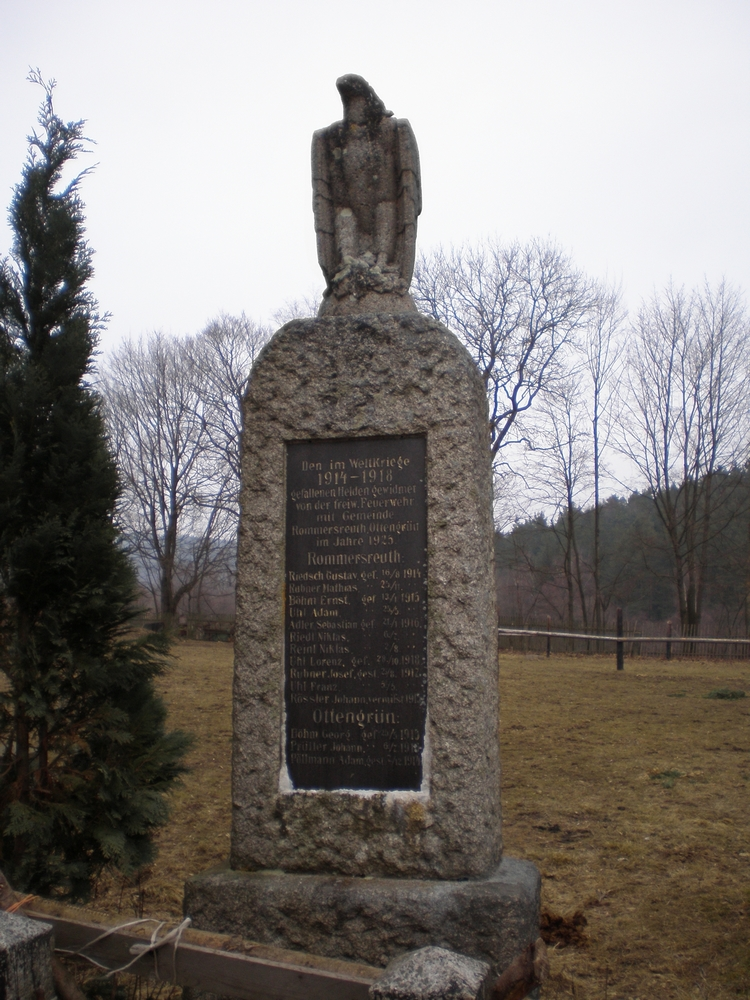
WW1 memorial.

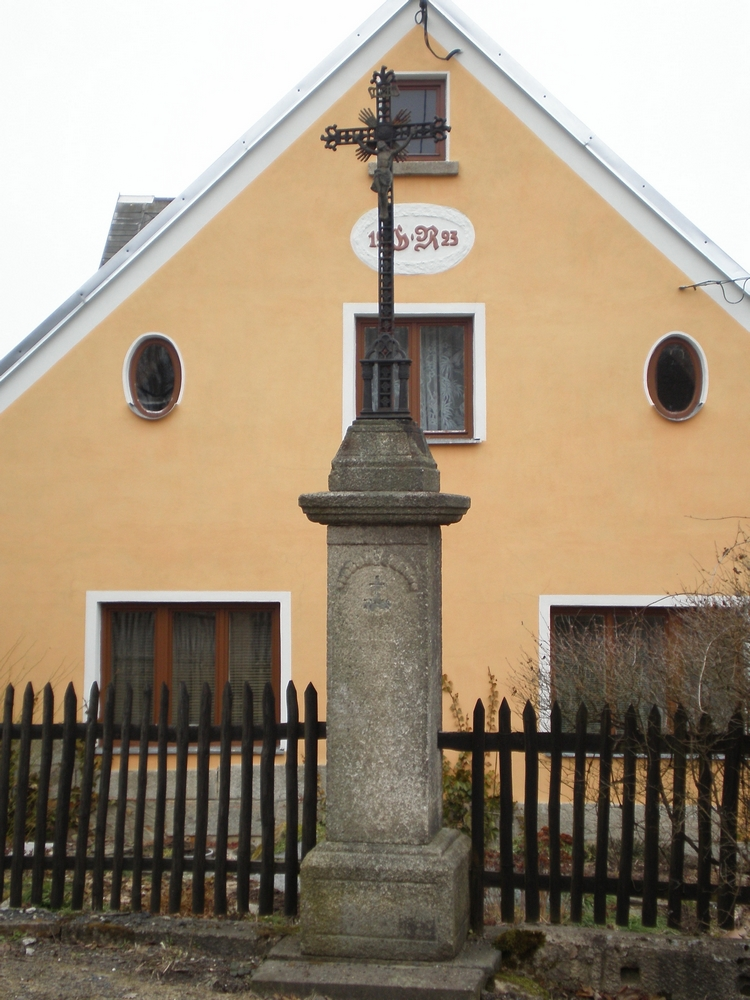
Crucifix.

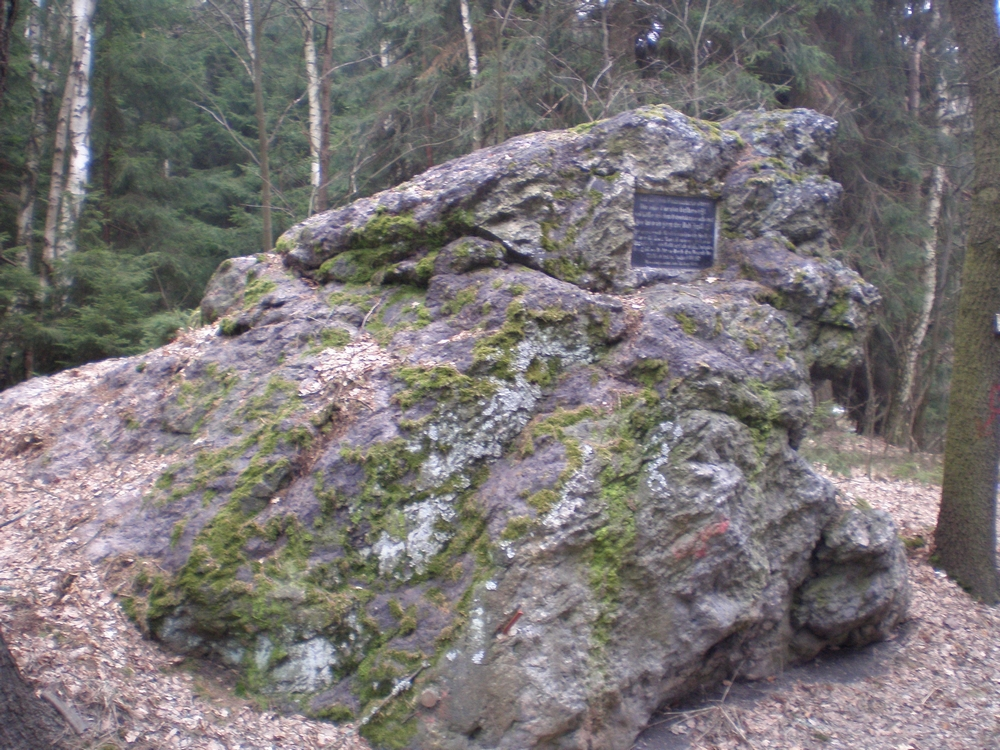
The Rock of Goethe.
