= Vlastislav (Hazlov) =

- Village
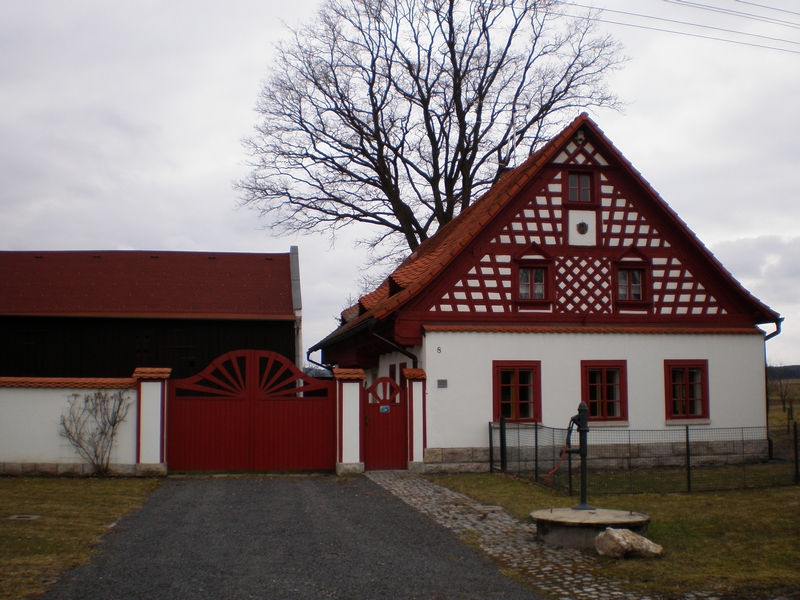
- Interactive map of Vlastislav
- Coordinates: 50°8′28″N 12°15′51″E
- Country: Czech Republic
- Region: Karlovy Vary
- District: Cheb
- Municipality: Hazlov
- First mentioned: 1332

Area
  - Total: 2.94 km^{2} (1.14 sq mi)
- Elevation: 535 m (1,755 ft)

Population (2001)
  - Total: 13
  - Density: 4.4/km^{2} (11/sq mi)
- Time zone: UTC+1 (CET)
  - Summer (DST): UTC+2 (CEST)
- Postal code: 35132

Vlastislav, formerly Táborská (German: Seichenreuth) is a village in Karlovy Vary Region, Czech Republic. It is one of the six municipality districts of Hazlov. In 2001 the village had a population of 13.

== Geography ==
Vlastislav lies 3 kilometres southwest from Hazlov, about 535 meters above sea level. It is surrounded by forests. It neighbour with Polná to the northwest, with Libá to the southwest, with Ostroh to the southeast, with Poustka to the east and with Hazlov to the northeast.

== History ==
Vlastislav was first mentioned in 1322. Oldest names of the village are; Sewkenrewt (1322), Seukenreuth, Schewkenrewt, Seikeinreit and Seiscenreit.

From 1869 to 1910, village was a part of municipality of Ostroh. In 1921, Vlastislav created an own municipality. Later was joined to Polná, and in 1961 was finally joined to Hazlov. In 2016 the village was renamed from Táborská to Vlastislav.

== Gallery ==
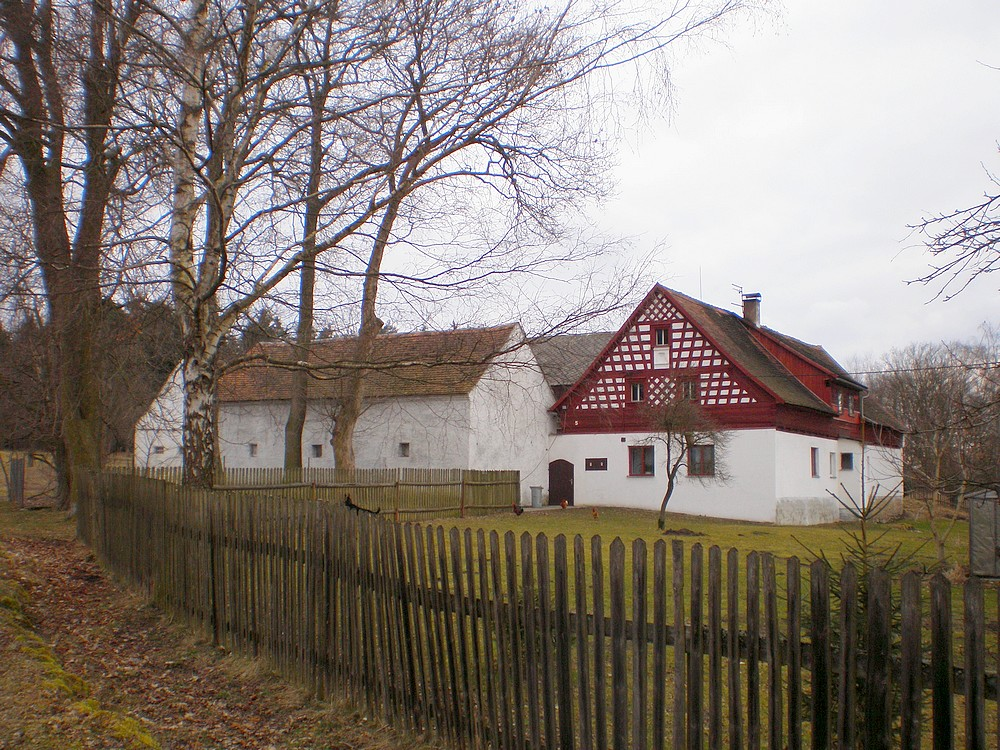
One of local frame-houses.

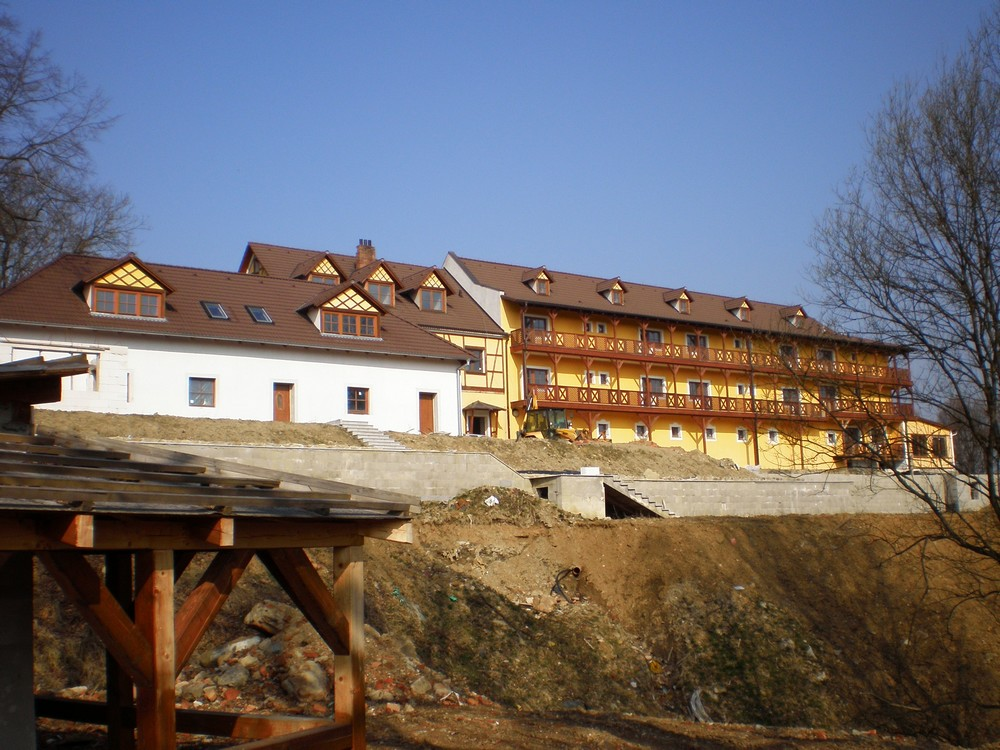
Old farmhouse, rebuilt to private clinic.

== Sources ==
- SCHREINER, Lorenz: Heimatkreis Eger, Egereg Landtag e.V. (1997)
- STURM, Heribert: Ortslexikon der Böhmischen Länder, Oldenbourg (1995)
