= Kabelsketal =

- Municipality
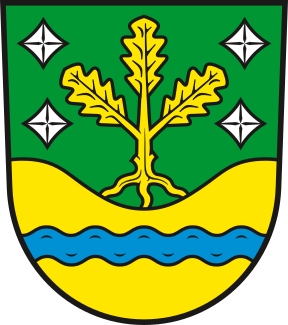
- Coat of arms

- Location of Kabelsketal within Saalekreis district
- Interactive map of Kabelsketal
- Location within Germany Location within Saxony-Anhalt
- Coordinates: 51°26′49″N 12°6′9″E
- Country: Germany
- State: Saxony-Anhalt
- District: Saalekreis
- Subdivisions: 4

Government
  - Mayor (2018–25): Steffen Kunnig

Area
  - Total: 51 km^{2} (20 sq mi)
- Elevation: 113 m (371 ft)

Population (2025-12-31)
  - Total: 8,895
  - Density: 170/km^{2} (450/sq mi)
- Time zone: UTC+01:00 (CET)
  - Summer (DST): UTC+02:00 (CEST)
- Postal codes: 06184
- Dialling codes: 034605
- Vehicle registration: SK
- Website: www.kabelsketal.de

Kabelsketal (German pronunciation: [kaˈbɛlskəˌtaːl], lit. 'Kabelske Valley') is a municipality in the Saalekreis district, in Saxony-Anhalt, Germany. It is situated east of Halle (Saale). It was formed in 2004 out of the villages of Dieskau, Dölbau, Gröbers und Großkugel.
