= Libá =

- Municipality
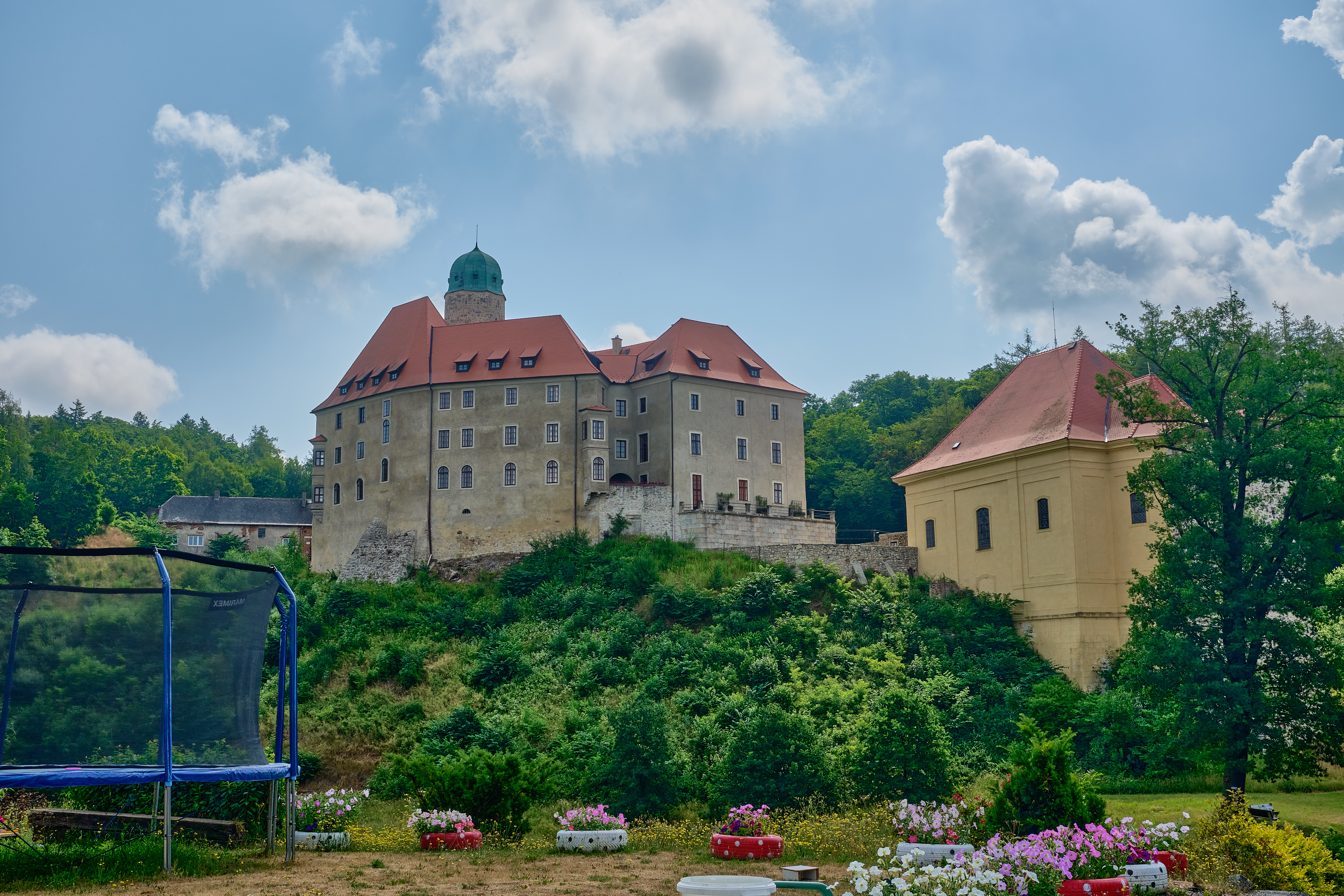
- Libá Castle

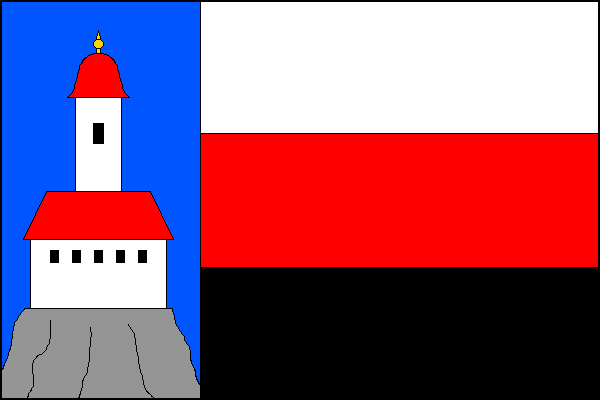
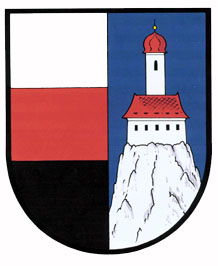
- Flag Coat of arms

- Location in the Czech Republic
- Coordinates: 50°7′42″N 12°13′51″E
- Country: Czech Republic
- Region: Karlovy Vary
- District: Cheb
- First mentioned: 1264

Area
  - Total: 26.63 km^{2} (10.28 sq mi)
- Elevation: 508 m (1,667 ft)

Population (2026-01-01)
  - Total: 817
  - Density: 30.7/km^{2} (79.5/sq mi)
- Time zone: UTC+1 (CET)
  - Summer (DST): UTC+2 (CEST)
- Postal codes: 350 02, 351 31
- Website: www.obec-liba.eu

Libá (until 1948 Libštejn; German: Liebenstein) is a municipality and village in Cheb District in the Karlovy Vary Region of the Czech Republic. It has about 800 inhabitants.

== Administrative division ==
Libá consists of two municipal parts (in brackets population according to the 2021 census):

- Libá (676)
- Hůrka (103)

== Demographics ==
Historical population
Year	Pop.	±%
1869	3,328	—
1880	3,336	+0.2%
1890	3,231	−3.1%
1900	3,105	−3.9%
1910	2,937	−5.4%
1921	2,717	−7.5%
1930	3,008	+10.7%
1950	943	−68.7%
1961	788	−16.4%
1970	719	−8.8%
1980	568	−21.0%
1991	494	−13.0%
2001	577	+16.8%
2011	715	+23.9%
2021	779	+9.0%
Source: Censuses
