= List of honorary citizens of Munich =

The honorary citizenship (Ehrenbürgerrecht) is the highest decoration of the city of Munich. Since 1881, 49 people have been awarded honorary citizenship. The honorary citizenships of Paul von Hindenburg, Franz Ritter von Epp, Franz Xaver Schwarz, Adolf Hitler and Hermann Göring were revoked in 1946.

The honorary citizenship is awarded in recognition of outstanding contributions to the city of Munich. It is not restricted to people living in Munich. A posthumous grant is not allowed. It is a symbolic honour; the recipient does not receive any rights, privileges or duties.

The following list is ordered according to the year of bestowal:

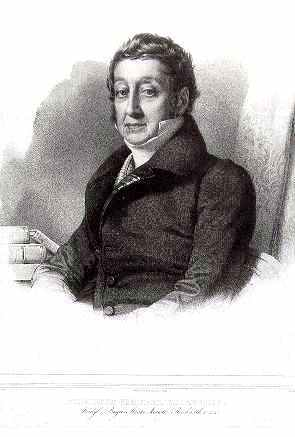

1. Georg Friedrich Freiherr von Zentner (27 August 1752 in Straßenheim – 21 October 1835 in Munich)
  granted 1820
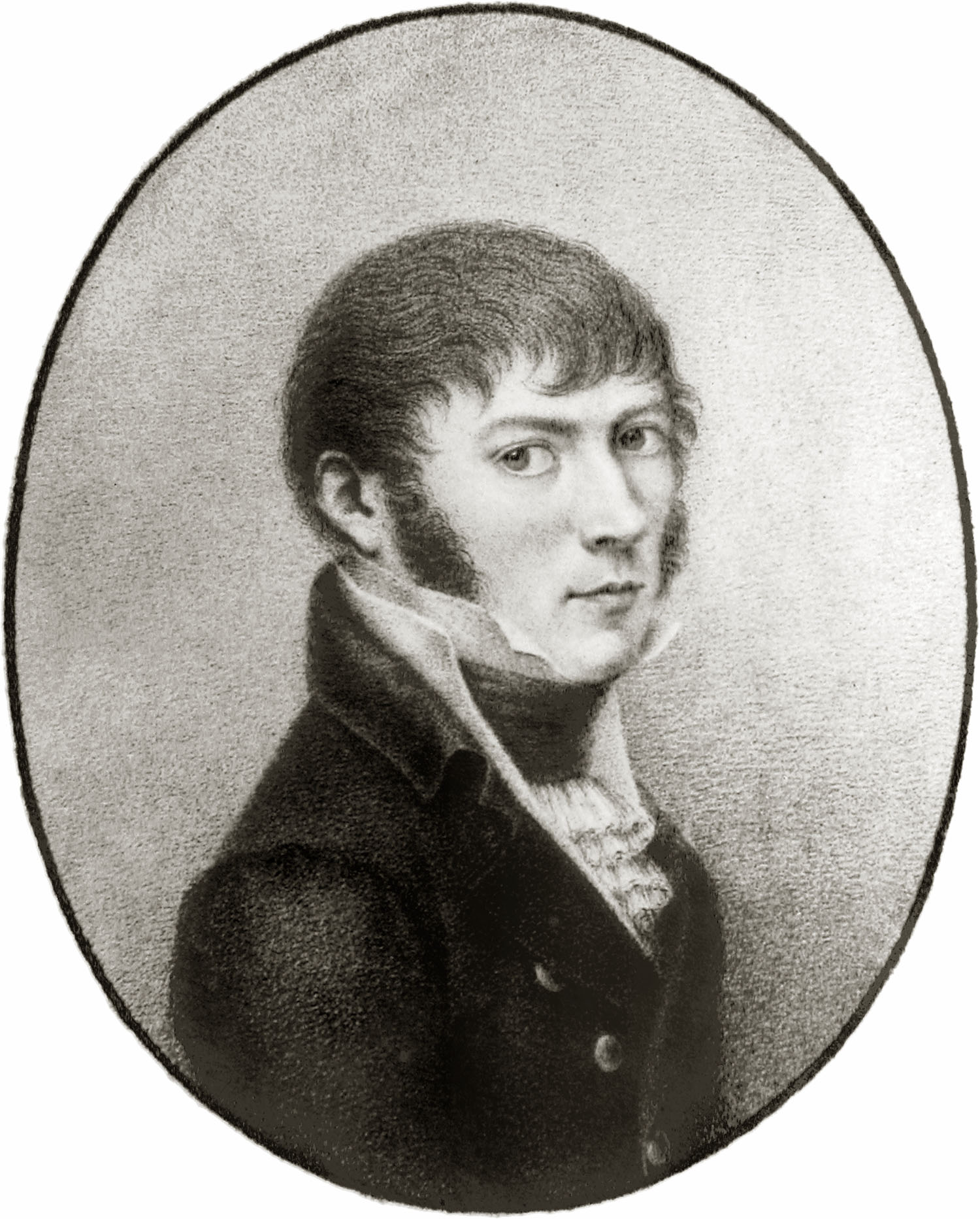
2. Joseph Ritter von Fraunhofer (6 March 1787 in Straubing – 7 June 1826 in Munich)
  granted 1824
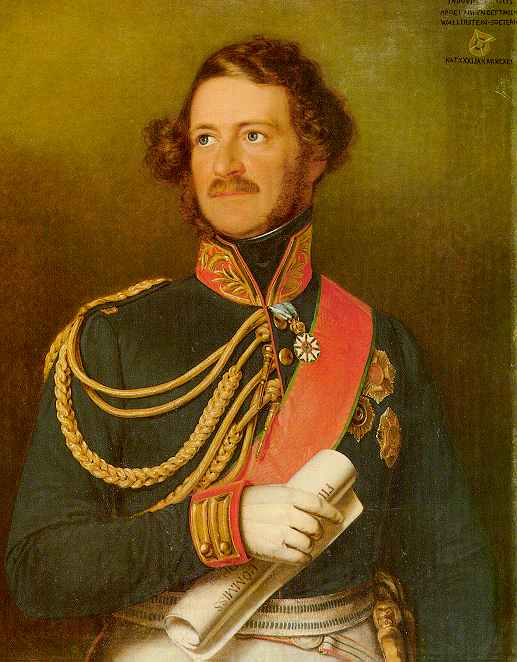
3. Ludwig Fürst von Oettingen-Wallerstein (31 January 1791 in Wallerstein – 22 June 1870 in Luzern)
  granted 1837
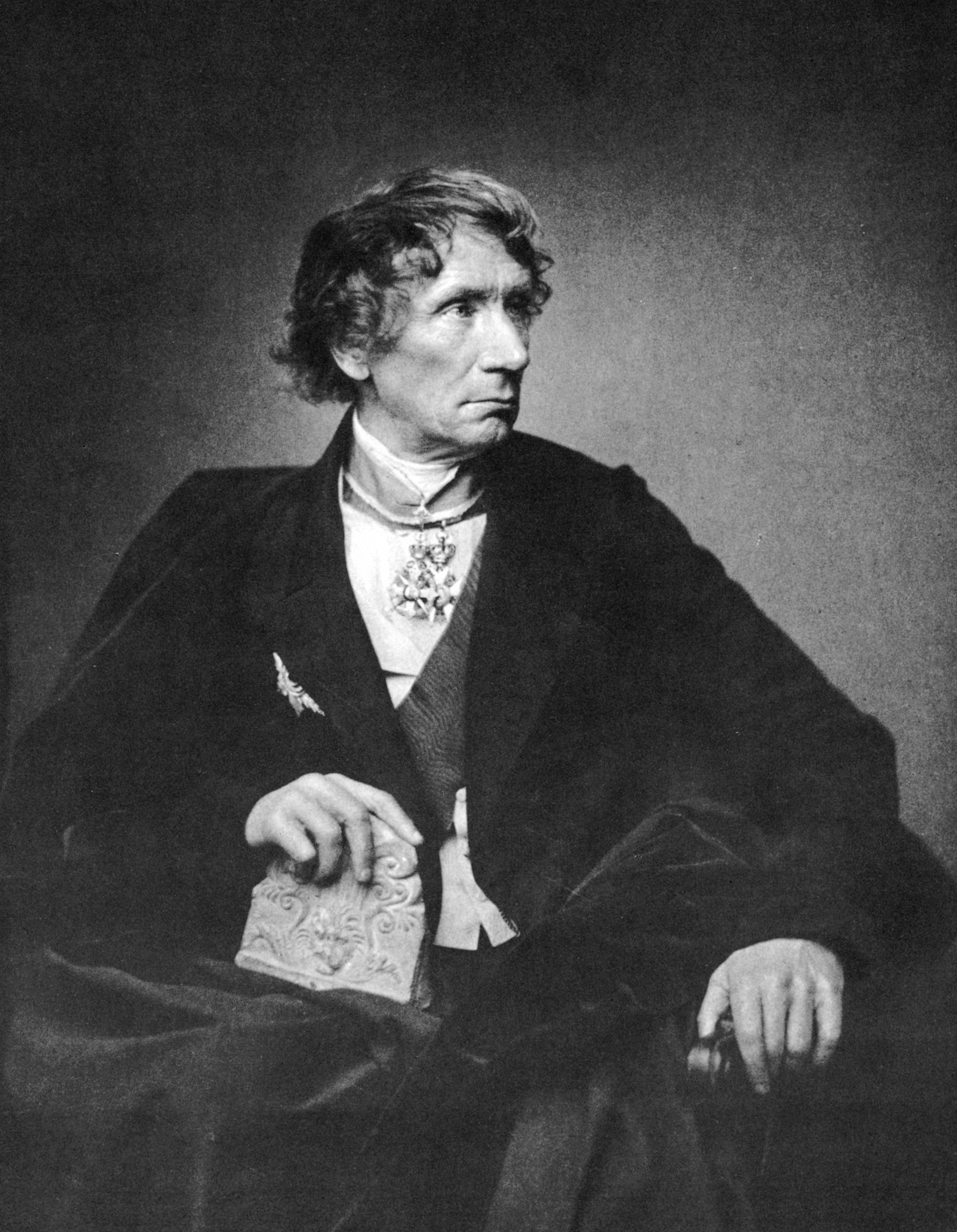
4. Leo von Klenze (29 February 1784 in Buchladen near Schladen – 27 January 1864 in Munich)
  granted 1862
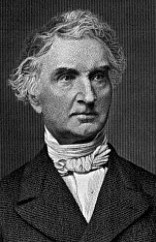
5. Justus von Liebig (12 May 1803 in Darmstadt – 18 April 1873 in Munich)
  granted 1870
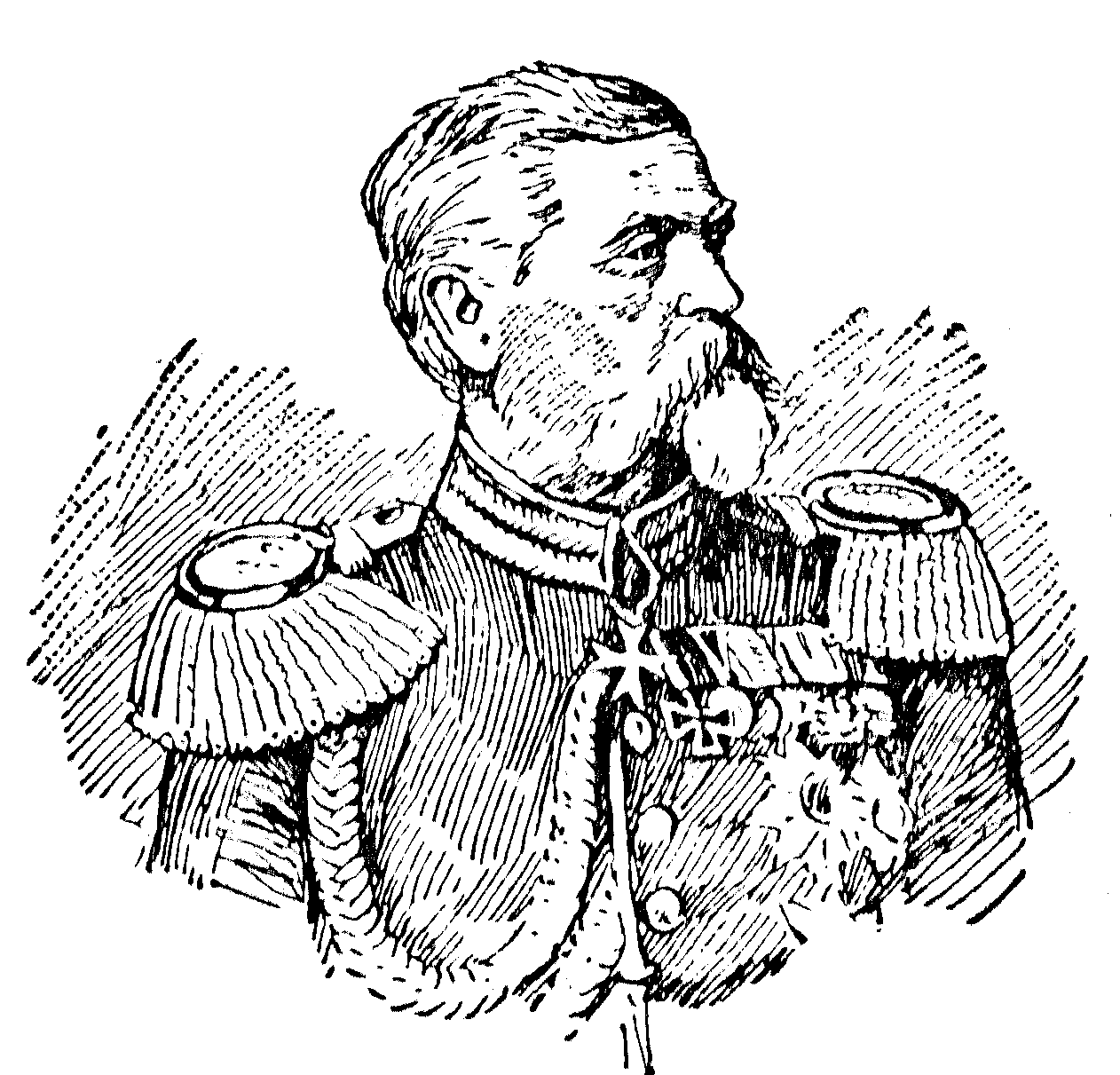
6. Ludwig von der Tann-Rathsamhausen (18 June 1815 in Darmstadt – 26 April 1881 in Meran)
  granted 1871
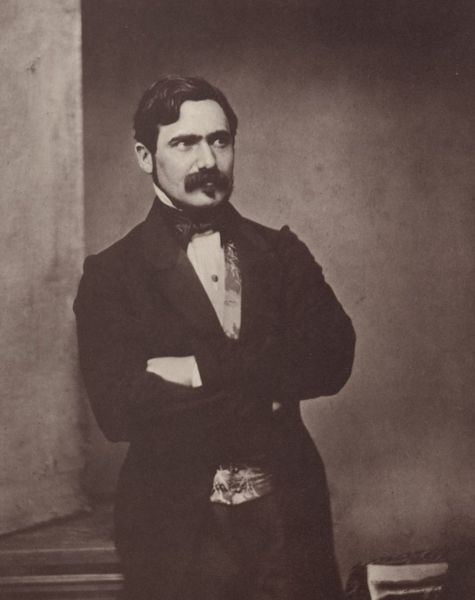
7. Max von Pettenkofer (3 December 1818 in Lichtenheim near Neuburg/Donau – 10 February 1901 in Munich)
  granted 1872
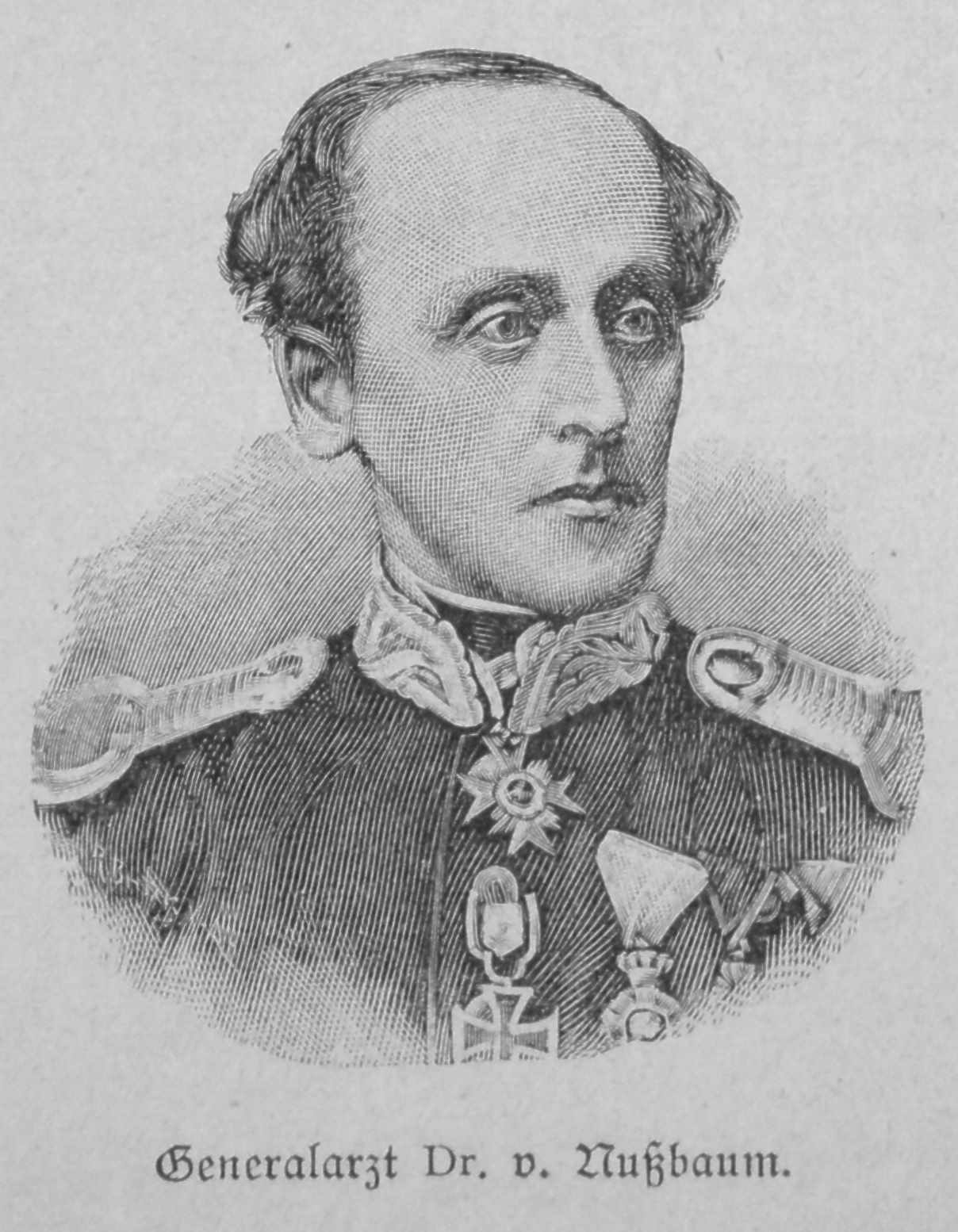
8. Johann Nepomuk von Nussbaum (2 September 1829 Munich – 31 October 1890 in Munich)
  granted 1880
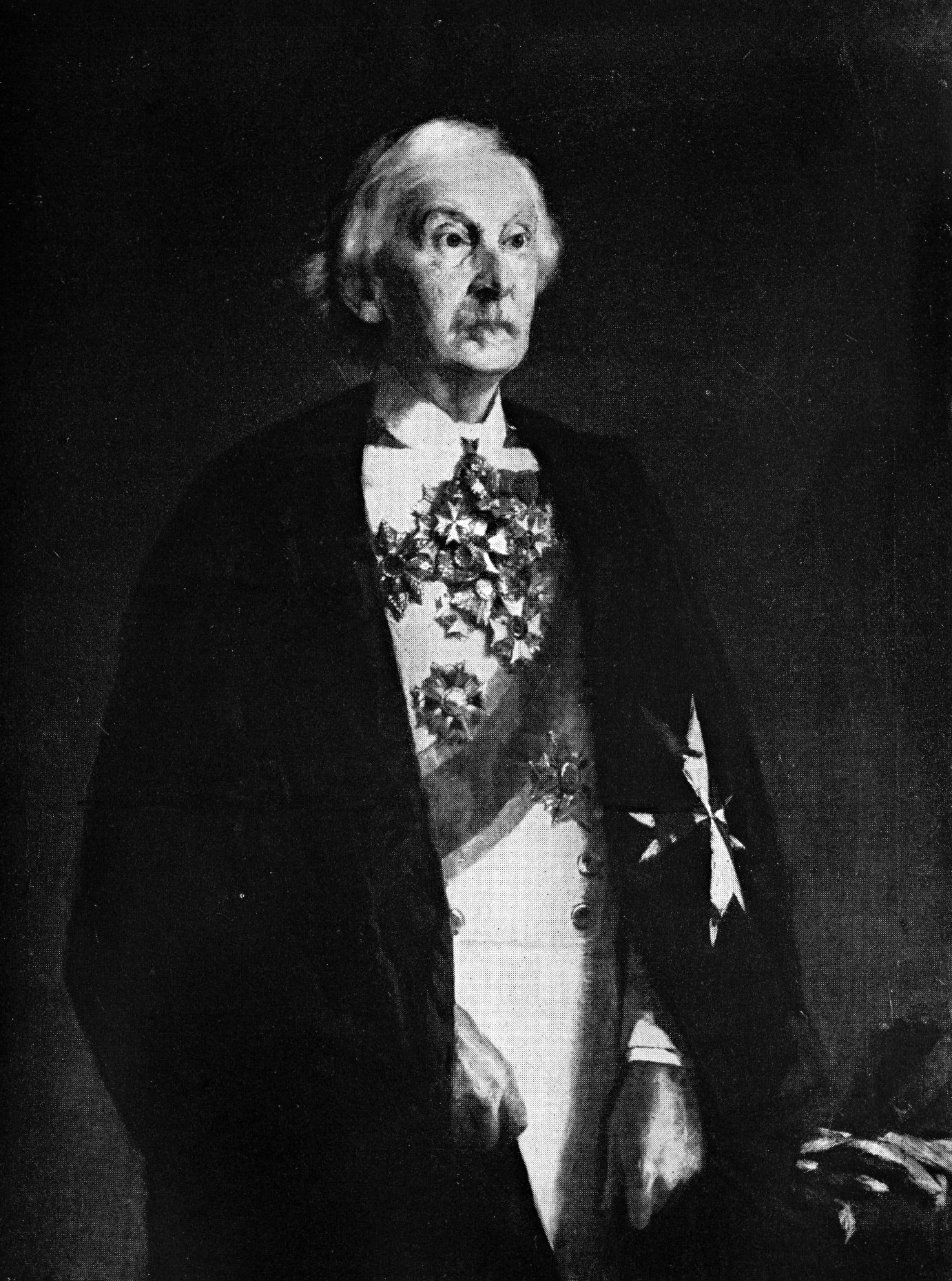
9. Adolf Friedrich von Schack (2 August 1815 in Brüsewitz – 14 April 1894 in Rome)
  granted 1881
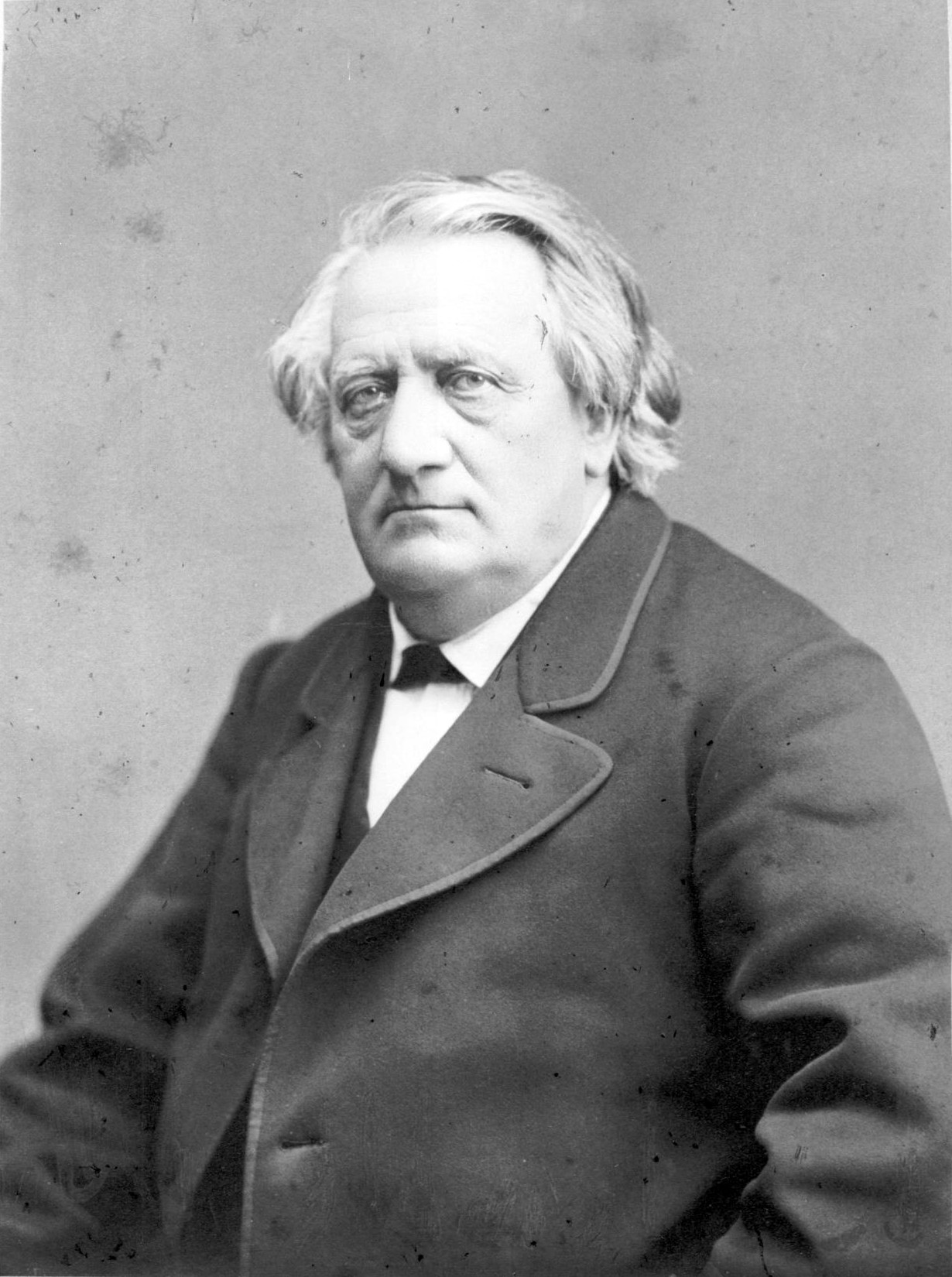
10. Franz Lachner (2 April 1803 in Rain (Lech) – 20 January 1890 in Munich)
  granted 1883
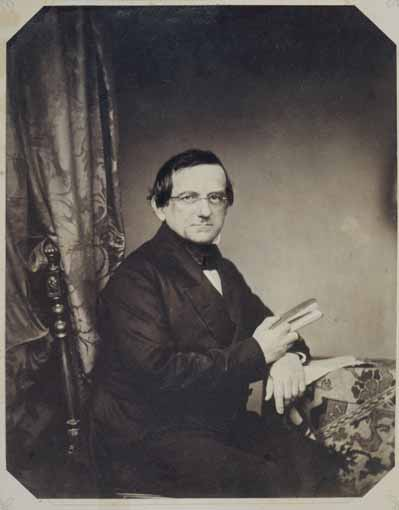
11. Franz Xaver von Gietl (27 August 1803 in Höchstädt/Donau – 19 March 1888)
  granted 1883
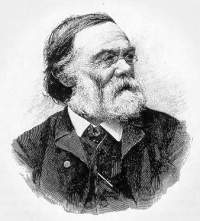
12. Carl Wilhelm von Gümbel (11 February 1823 in Dannenfels, Pfalz – 18 June 1898 in Munich)
  granted 1889
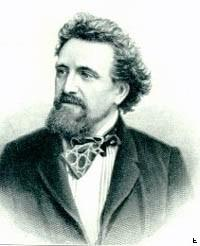
13. Hermann Lingg (22 January 1820 Lindau/Bodensee – 18 June 1905 in Munich)
  granted 1890
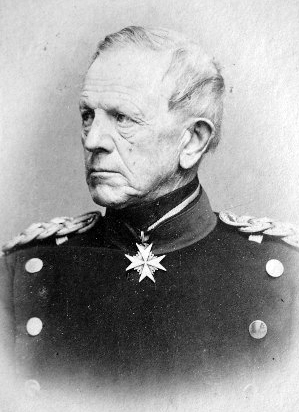
14. Helmuth Karl Bernhard von Moltke (26 October 1800 in Parchim – 24 April 1891 in Berlin)
  granted 1890
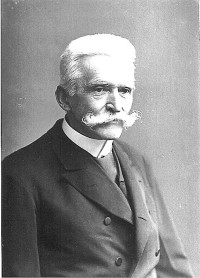
15. Sigmund von Pfeufer (24 February 1824 in Bamberg – 23 September 1894 in Munich)
  granted 1894
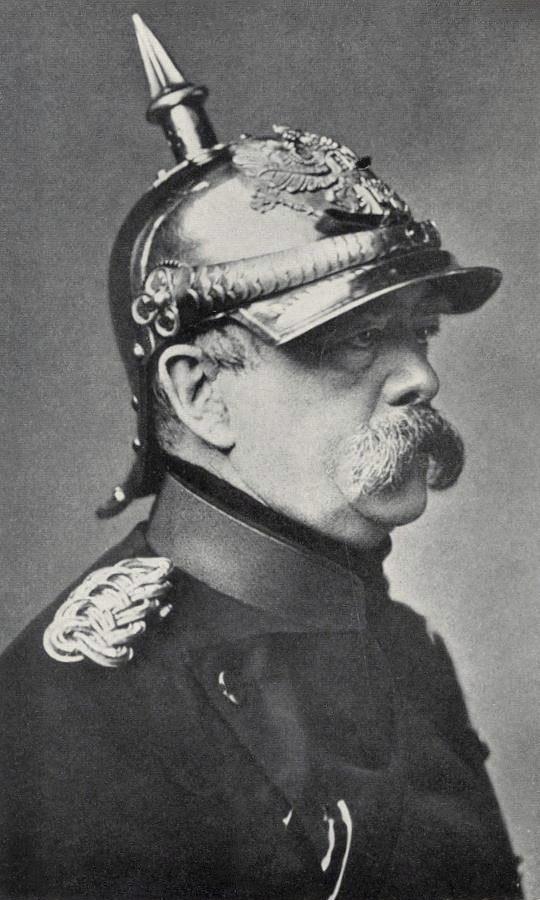
16. Otto von Bismarck (1 April 1815 in Schönhausen – 30 July 1898 in Friedrichsruh)
  granted 1895
17. Hugo von Ziemssen (13 December 1829 in Greifswald – 21 February 1902 in Munich)
  granted 1899
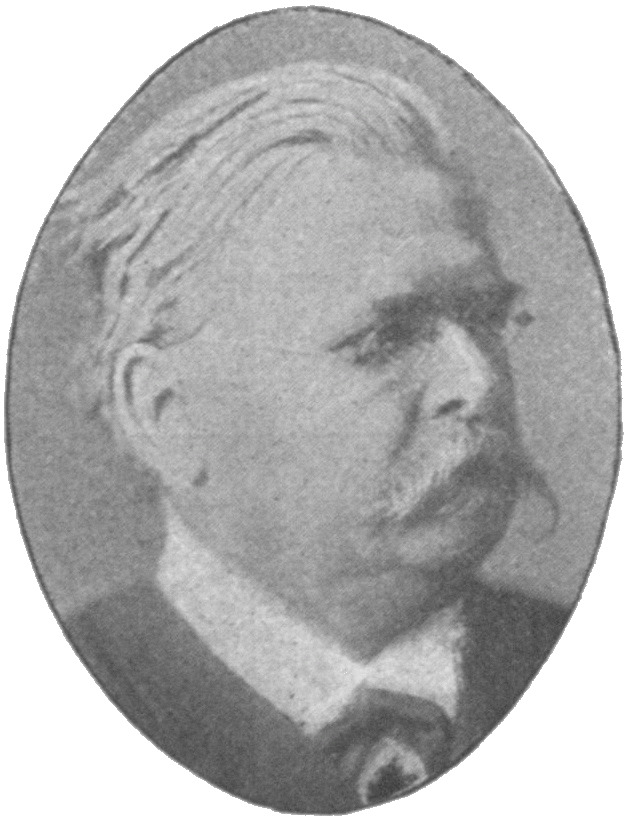
18. Emil Freiherr von Riedel (6 April 1832 in Kurzenaltheim – 13 August 1906 in Munich)
  granted 1902
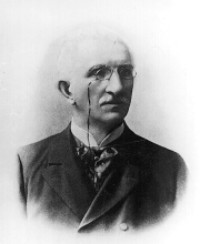
19. Maximilian von Feilitzsch (12 August 1834 in Trogen – 19 June 1913 in Munich)
  granted 1903
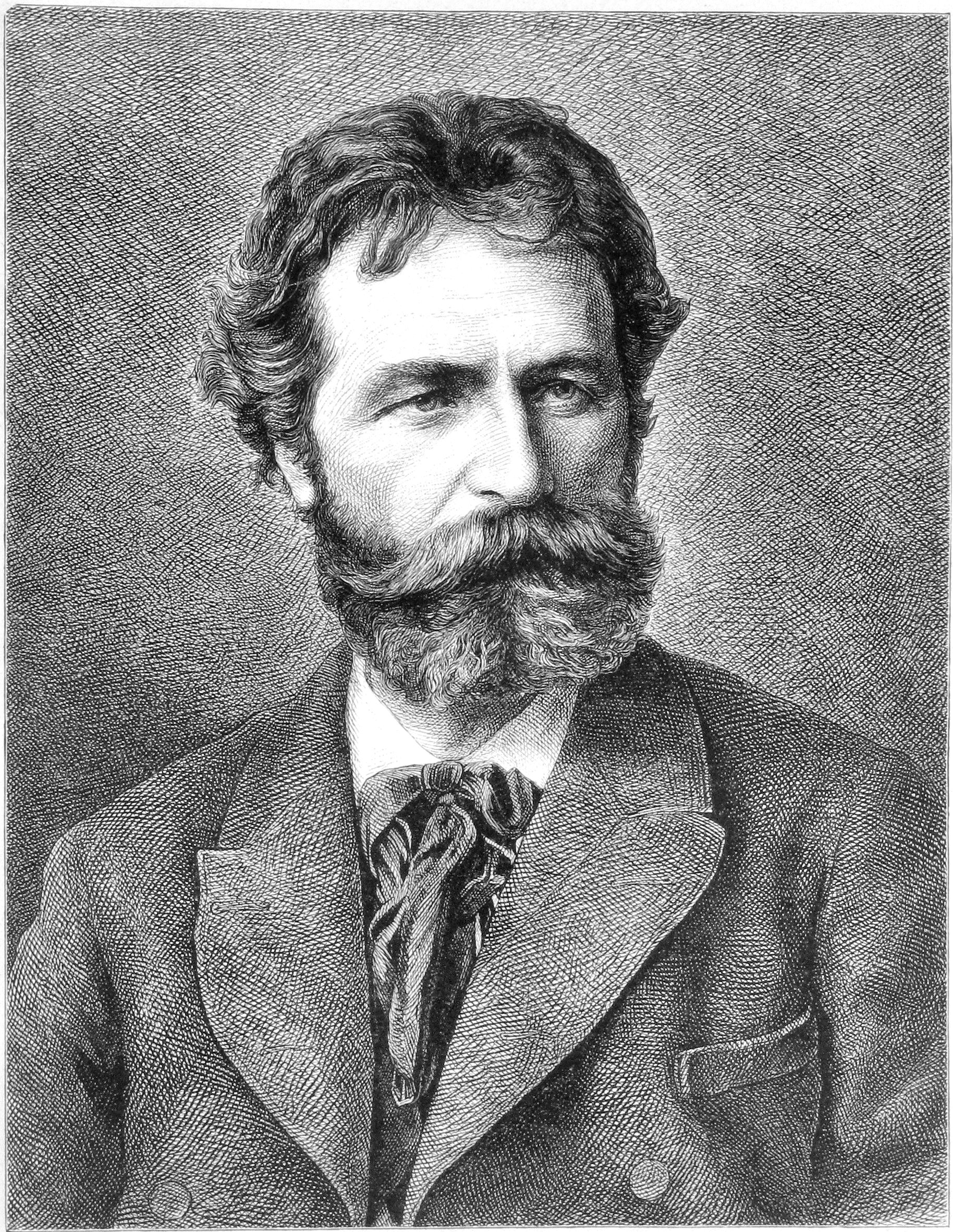
20. Franz Defregger (30 April 1835 in Ederhof near Stronach – 2 January 1921 in Munich)
  granted 1905
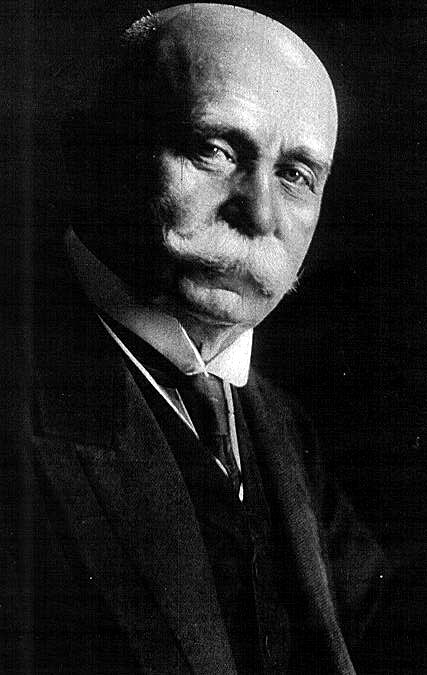
21. Ferdinand Graf von Zeppelin (8 July 1838 in Konstanz – 8 March 1917 in Berlin)
  granted 1909
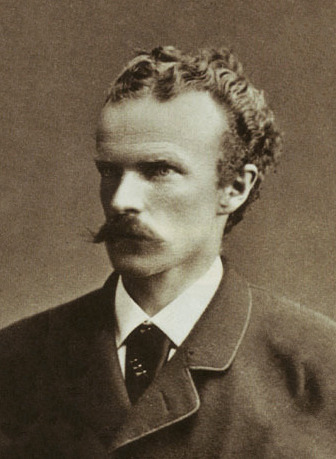
22. Carl Theodor in Bayern (9 August 1839 in Possenhofen – 30 November 1909 in Kreuth)
  granted 1909
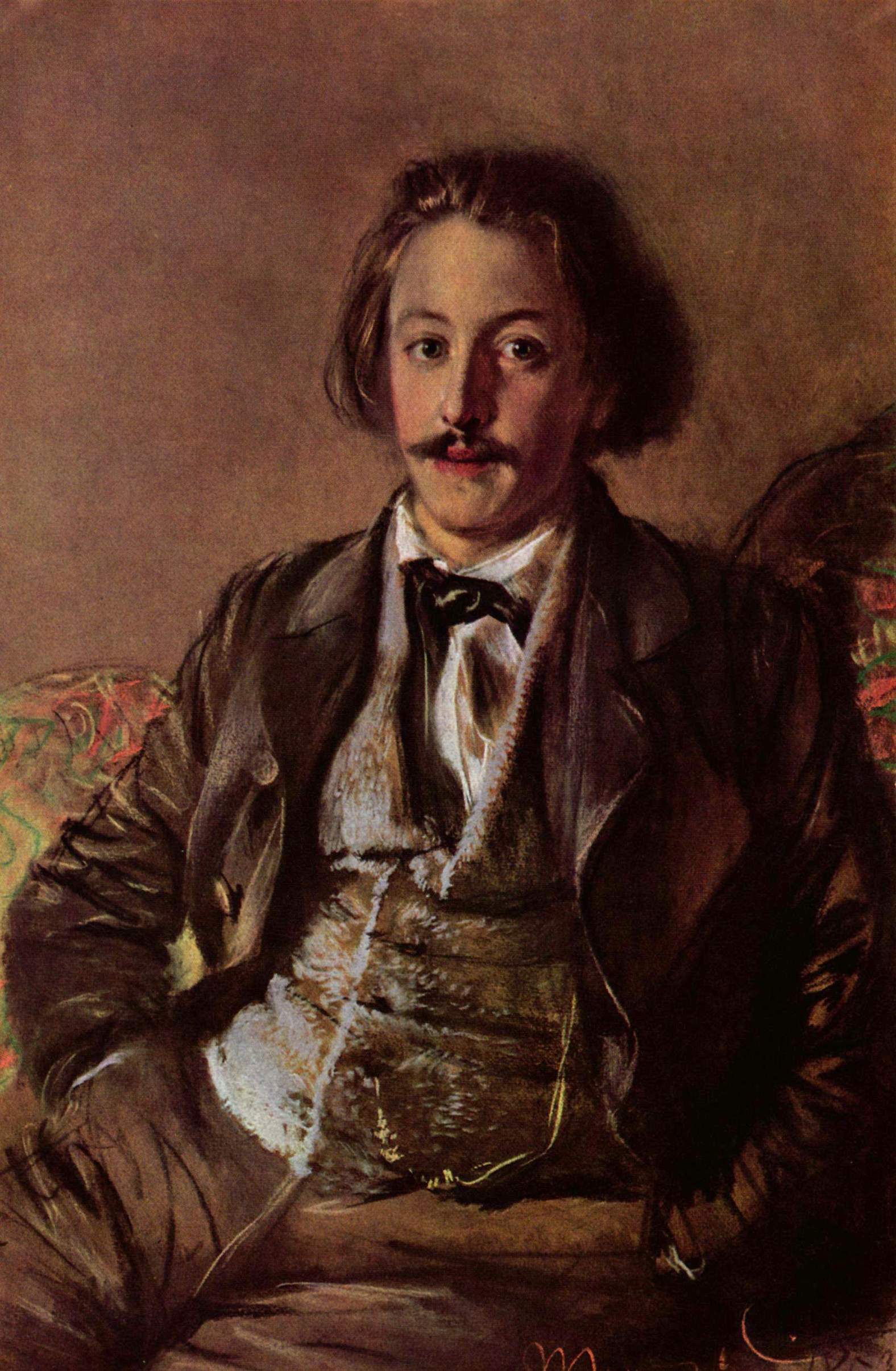
23. Paul von Heyse (15 March 1830 in Berlin – 2 April 1914 in Munich)
  granted 1910
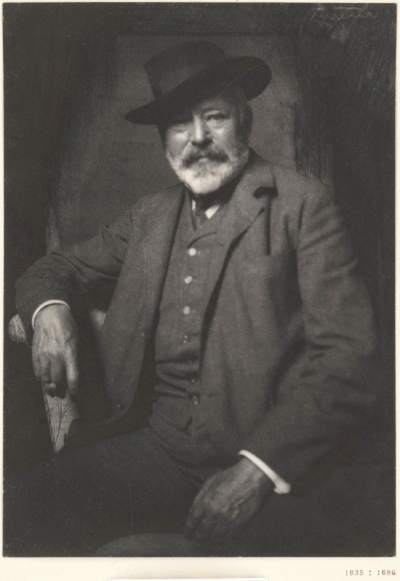
24. Ferdinand Freiherr von Miller (8 June 1842 in Munich – 18 December 1929 in Munich)
  granted 1912
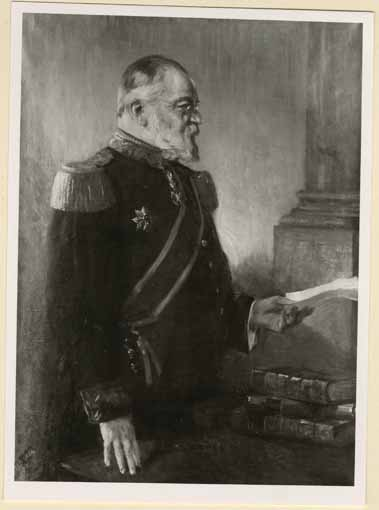
25. Karl Theodor von Heigel (23 August 1842 in Munich – 23 March 1915 in Munich)
  granted 1912
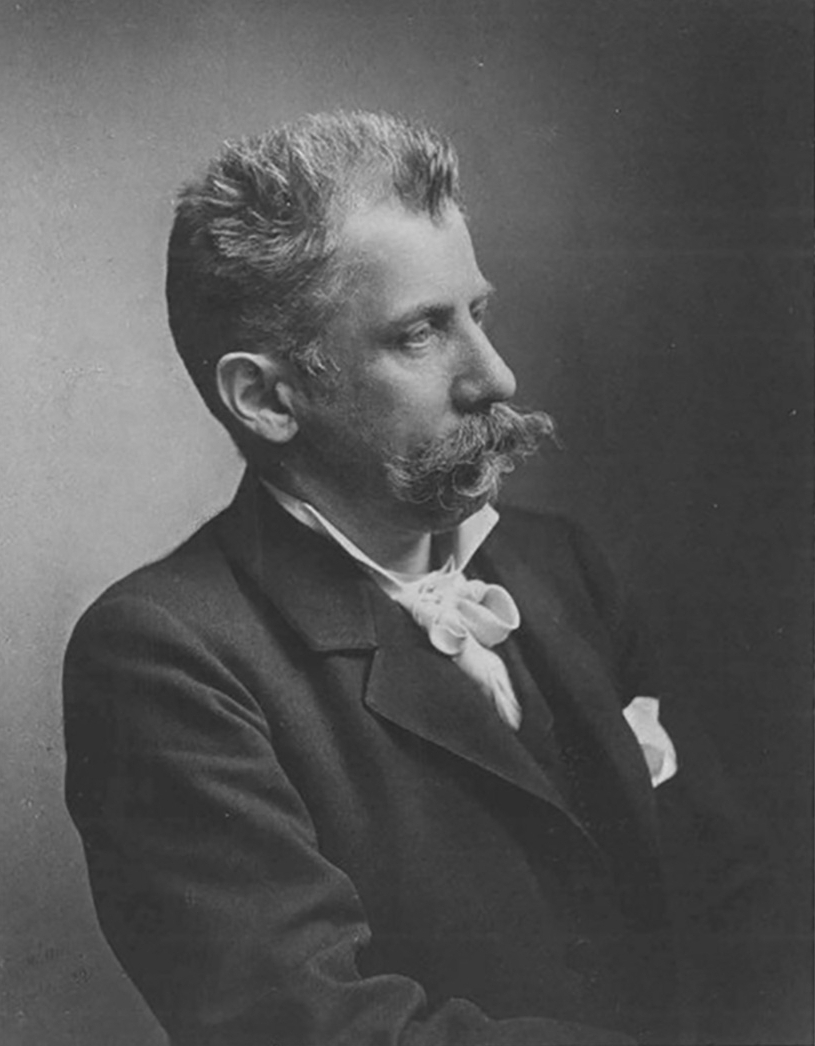
26. Gabriel von Seidl (9 December 1848 in Munich – 27 April 1913 in Bad Tölz)
  granted 1913
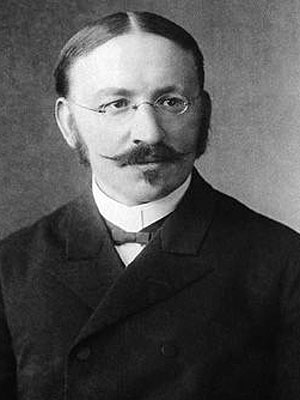
27. Wilhelm von Borscht (3 April 1857 in Speyer – 30 July 1943 in Munich)
  granted 1919
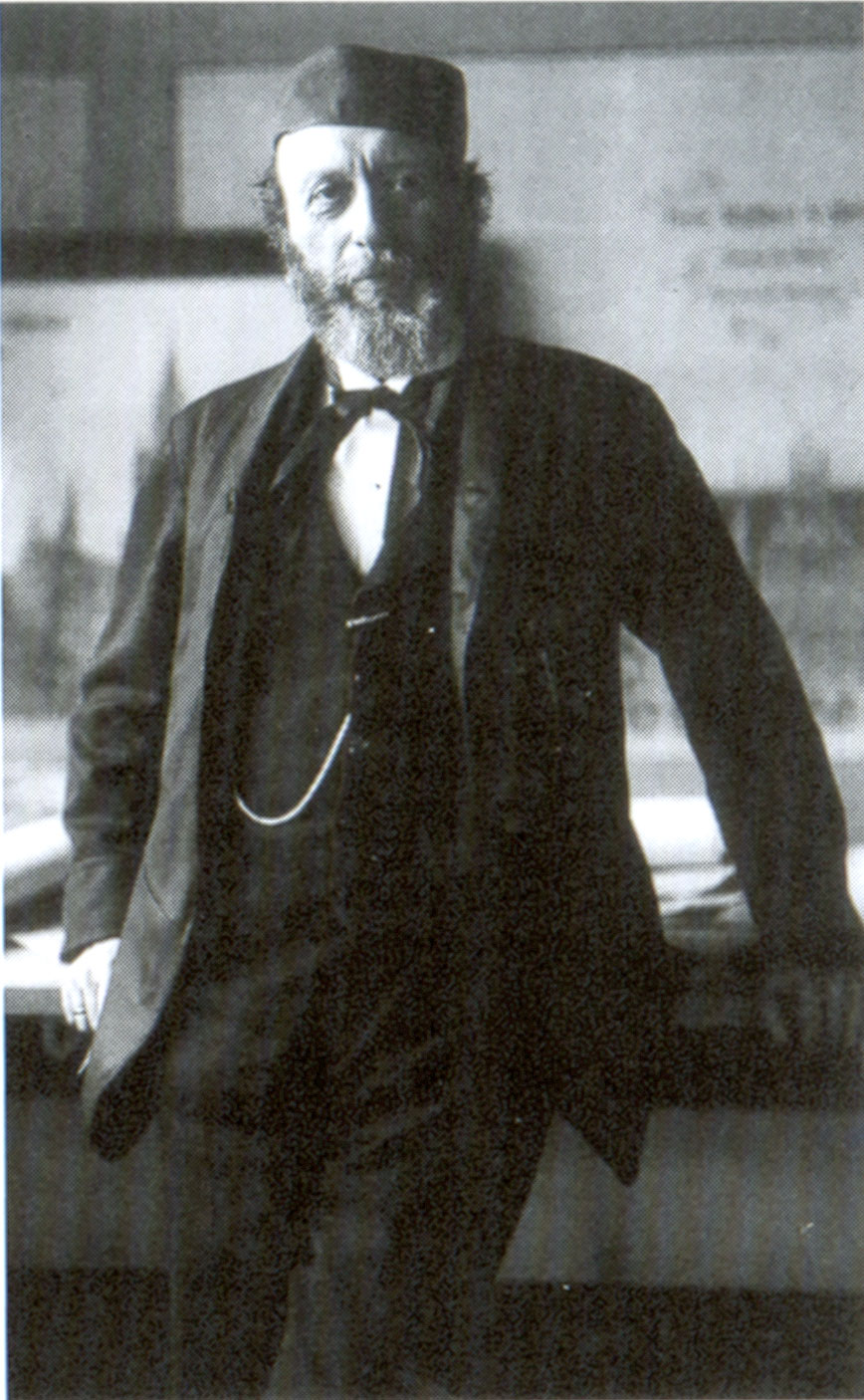
28. Georg von Hauberrisser (19 March 1841 in Graz – 17 May 1922 in Munich)
  granted 1921
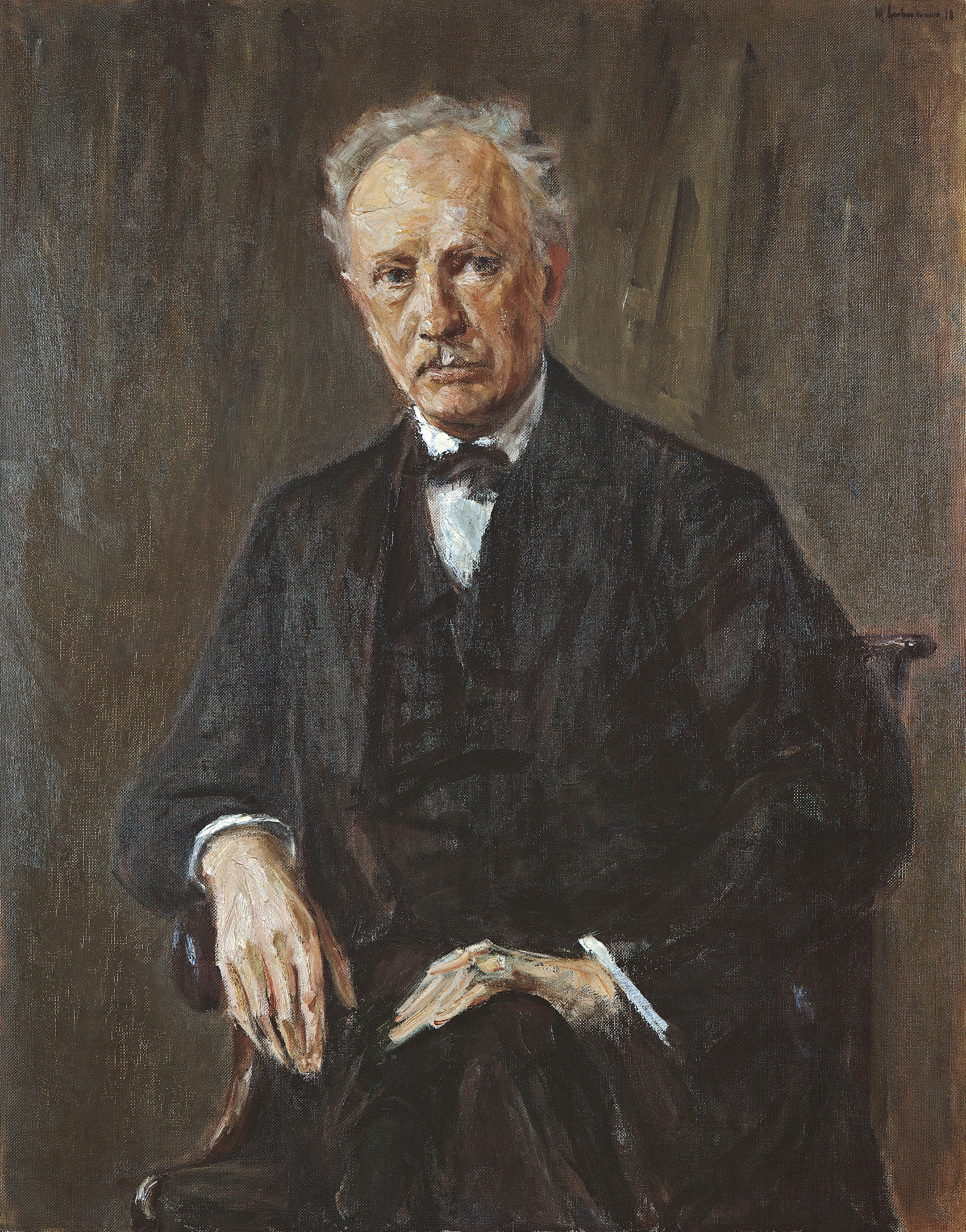
29. Richard Strauss (11 June 1864 in Munich – 8 September 1949 in Garmisch-Partenkirchen)
  granted 1924
30. Friedrich von Müller (17 September 1858 in Augsburg – 18 November 1941 in Munich)
  granted 1927
  - Paul von Hindenburg (2 October 1847 in Posen – 2 August 1934 at Gut Neudeck)
  granted 1929, revoked 1946
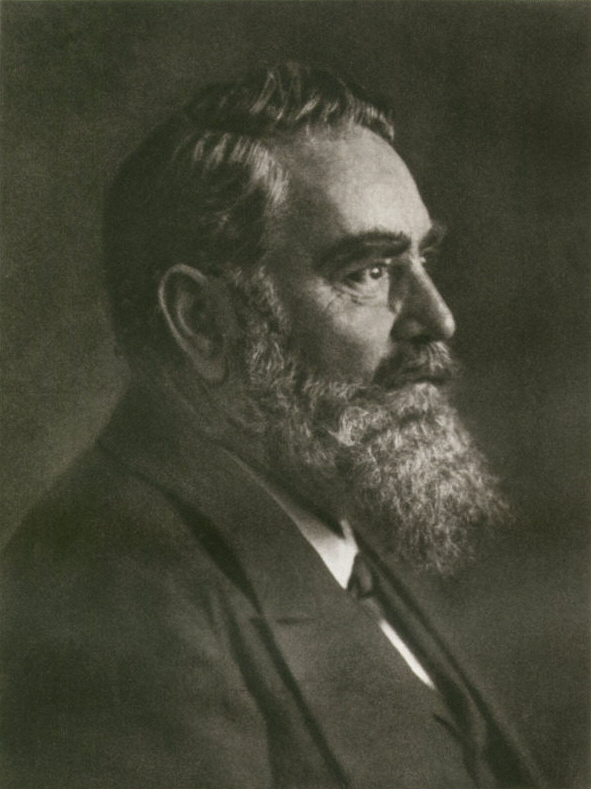
  Oskar von Miller
31. Oskar von Miller (7 May 1855 in Munich – 9 April 1934 in Munich)
  granted 1930
32. Eduard Schmid (15 October 1861 in Ostrach – 8 June 1933 in Munich)
  granted 1931
  - Franz Ritter von Epp (16 October 1868 in Munich – 31 December 1946 in Munich)
  granted 1933, revoked 1946
  - Ernst Röhm (28 November 1887 in Munich – 1 July 1934 in Munich)
  granted 1933, revoked 1946
  - Franz Xaver Schwarz (27 November 1875 in Günzburg – 2 December 1947 near Regensburg)
  granted 1935, revoked 1946
  - Adolf Hitler (20 April 1889 in Braunau/Inn – 30 April 1945 in Berlin)
  Führer des Deutschen Reichs
  granted 1939, revoked 1946
  - Hermann Göring (12 January 1893 in Rosenheim – 15 October 1946 in Nürnberg)
  granted 1943, revoked 1946
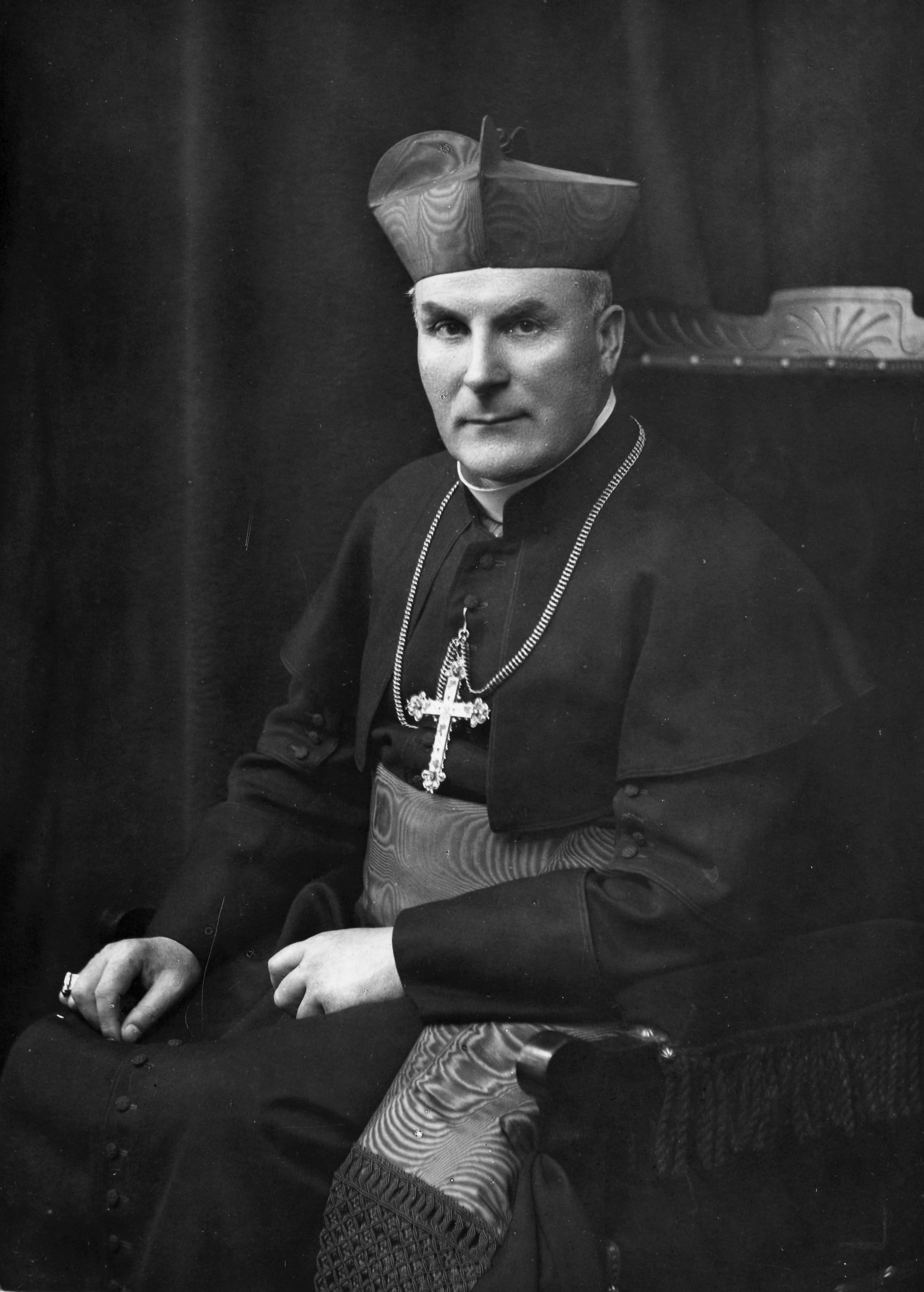
33. Michael von Faulhaber (5 March 1869 in Heidenfeld – 12 June 1952 in Munich),
  granted 1949
34. Thomas Wimmer (7 January 1887 in Siglfing – 18 January 1964 in Munich)
  granted 1957
35. Wilhelm Hoegner (23 September 1887 in Munich – 5 March 1980 in Munich)
  granted 1957
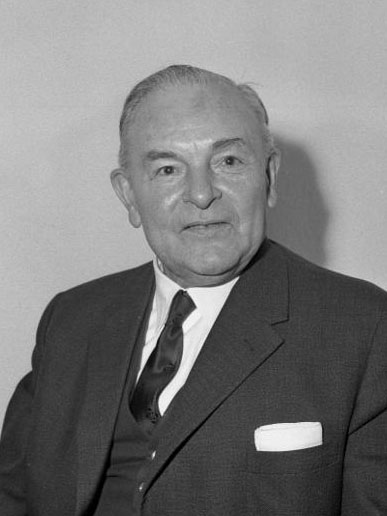
36. Hans Ehard (10 November 1887 in Bamberg – 18 October 1980)
  granted 1957
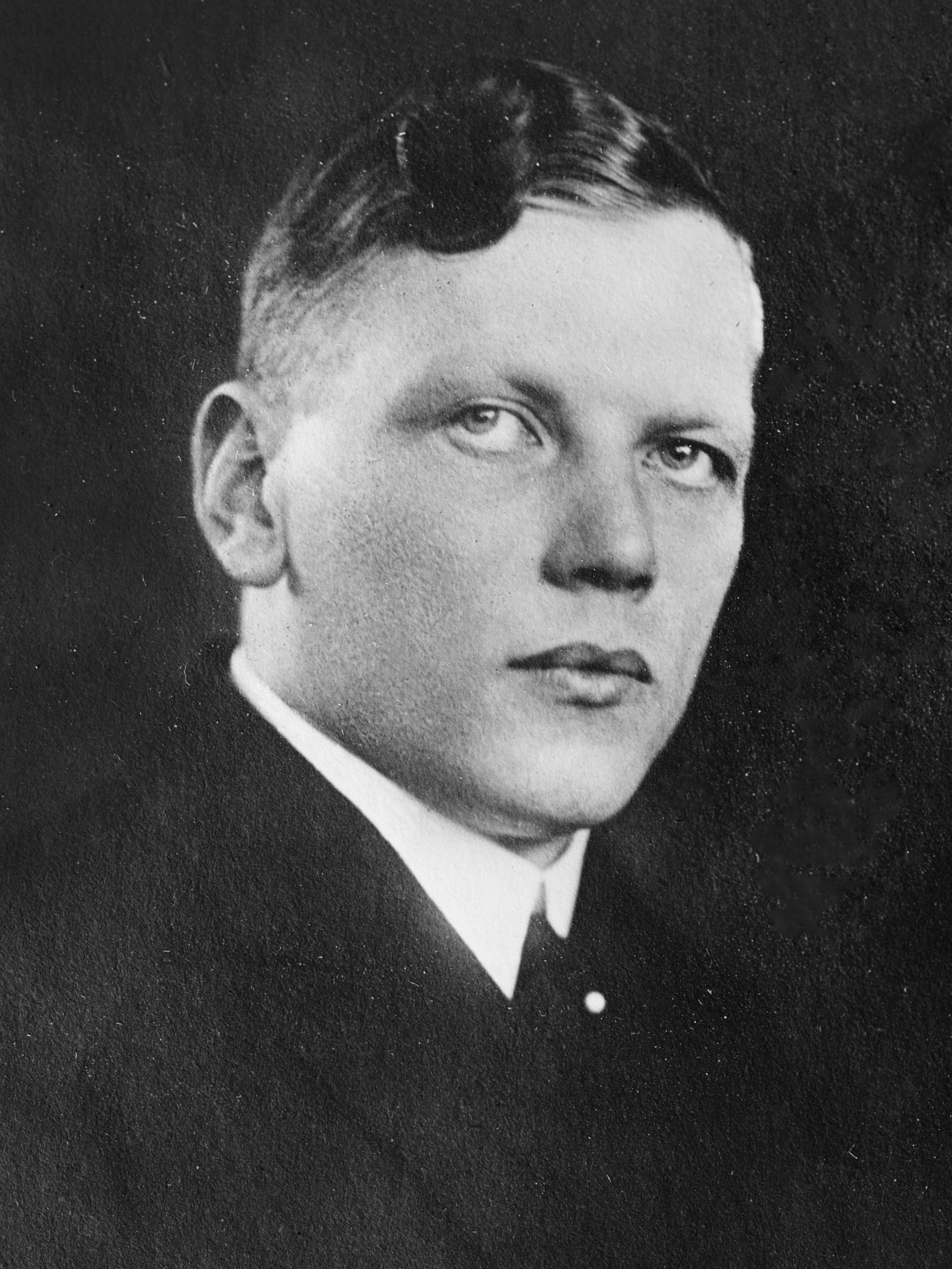
37. Hans Knappertsbusch (12 March 1888 Elberfeld – 25 October 1965 in Munich)
  granted 1963
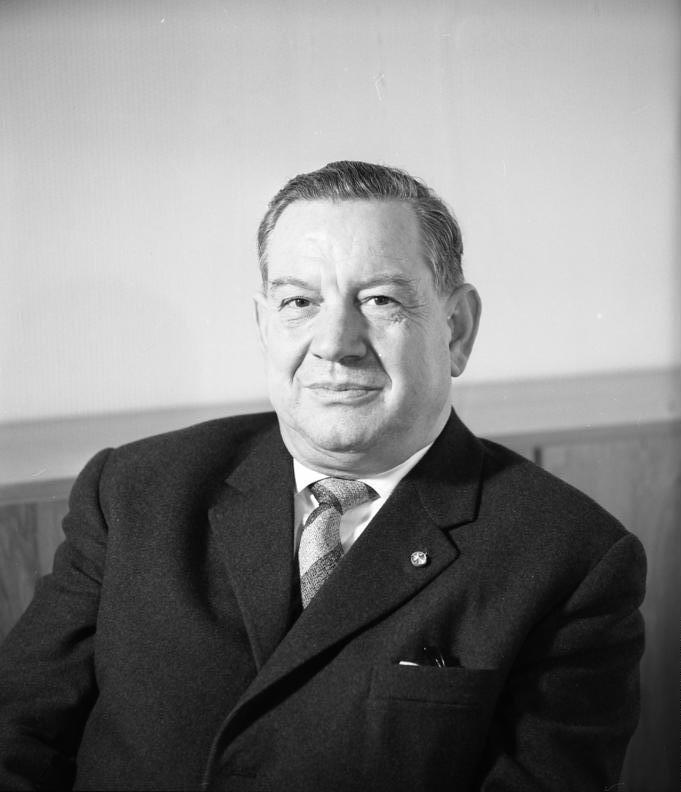
38. Alfons Goppel (1 October 1905 in Reinhausen – 24 December 1991 in Johannesberg)
  granted 1965
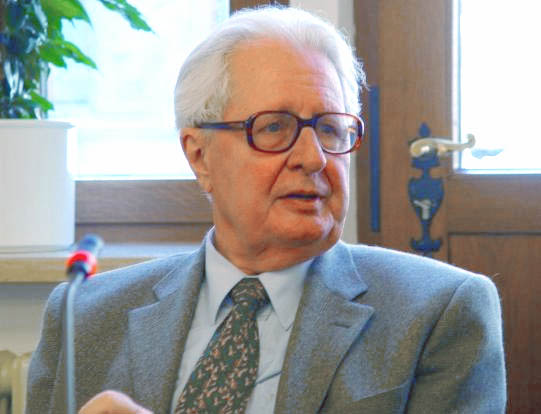
39. Hans-Jochen Vogel (3 February 1926 in Göttingen – 26 July 2020 in Munich)
  granted 1972
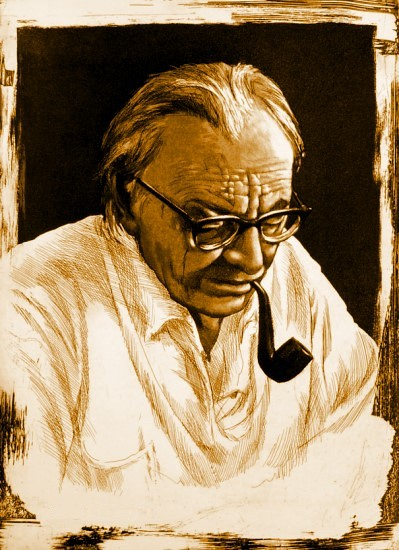
40. Carl Orff (10 July 1895 in Munich – 29 March 1982 in Munich)
  granted 1975
41. Werner Egk (17 May 1901 in Auchsesheim today: Donauwörth – 10 July 1983 in Inning/Ammersee)
  granted 1981
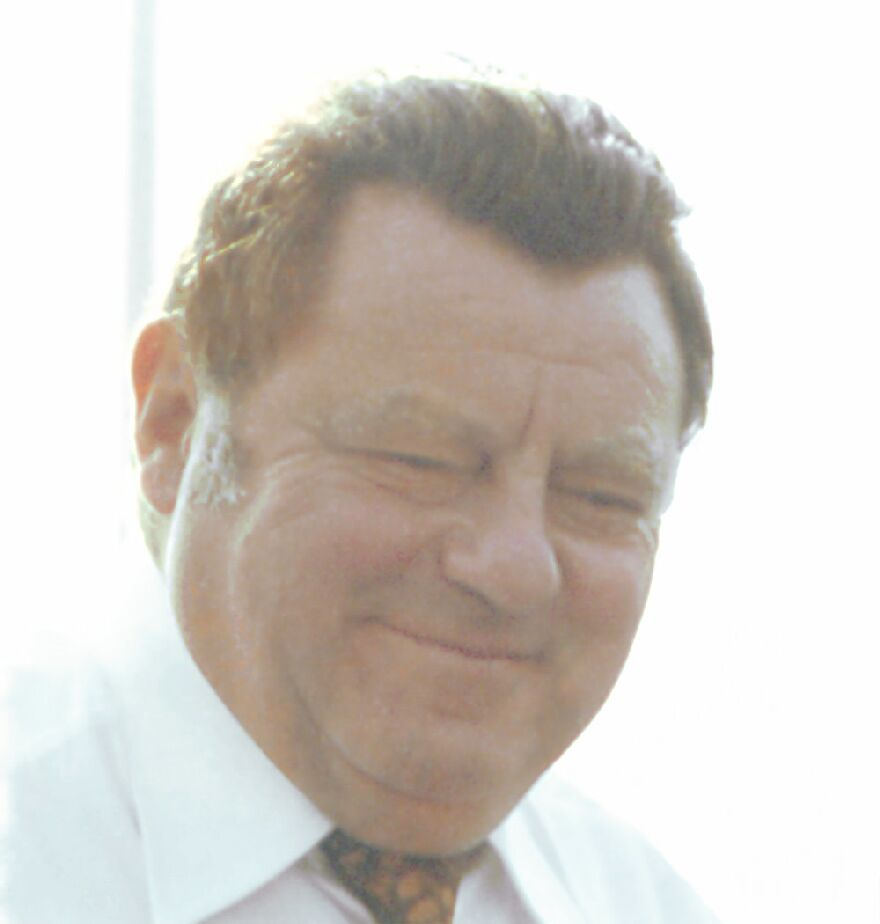
42. Franz Josef Strauß (6 September 1915 in Munich – 3 October 1988 in Regensburg)
  granted 1981
43. Adolf Butenandt (24 March 1903 in Lehe – 18 January 1995 in Munich)
  granted 1985
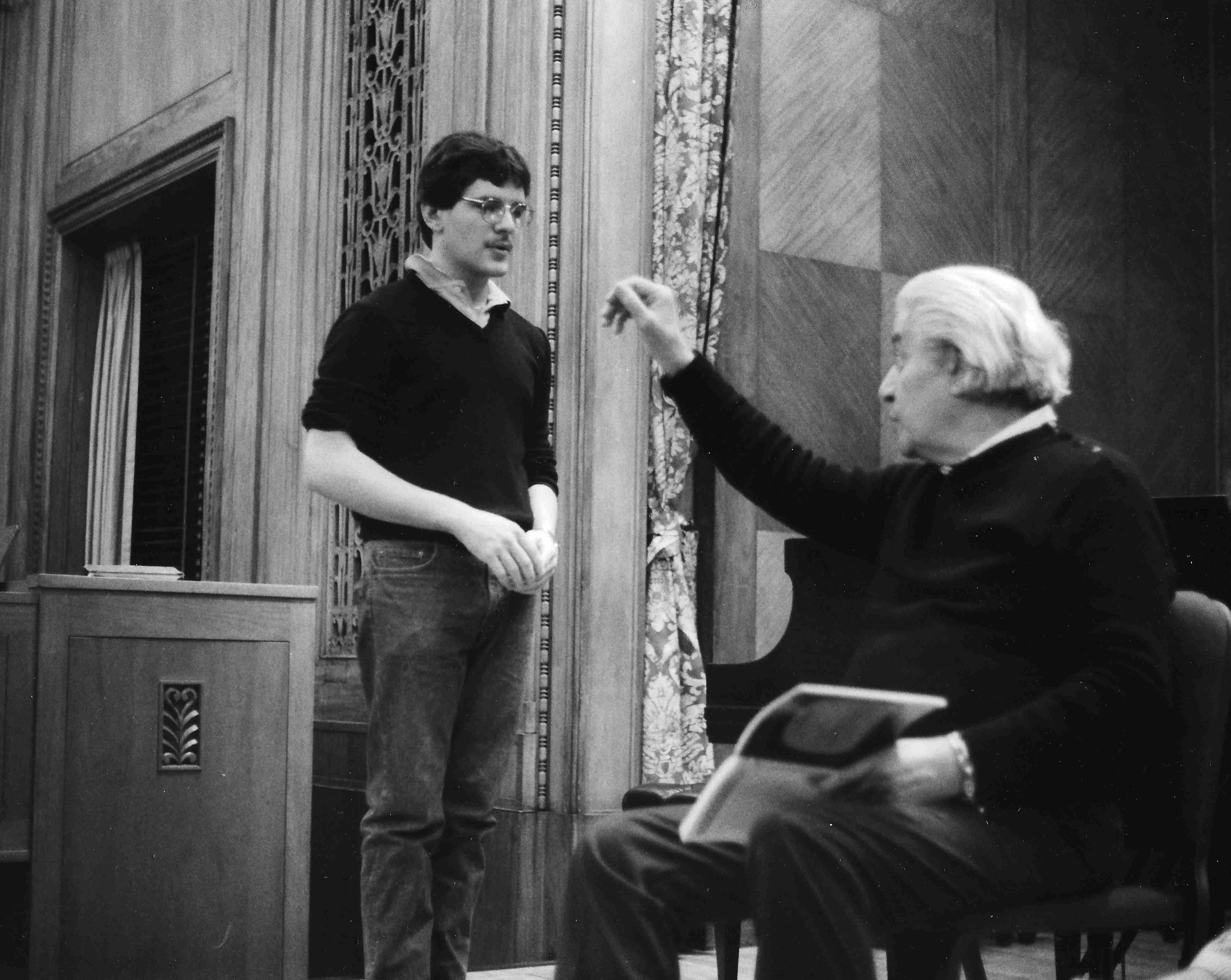
44. Sergiu Celibidache (11 July 1912 in Roman – 14 August 1996 in Paris)
  granted 1992
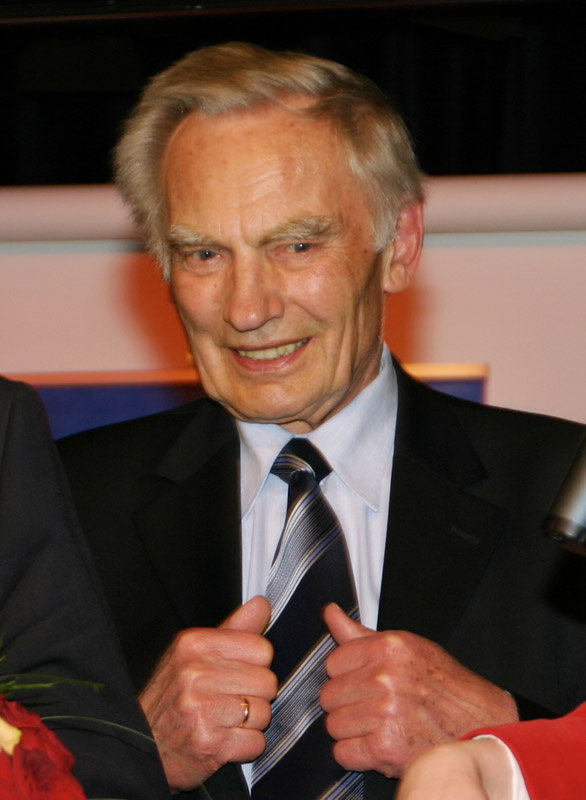
45. Georg Kronawitter (21 April 1928 in Oberthann – 28 April 2016 in Munich)
  granted 1993
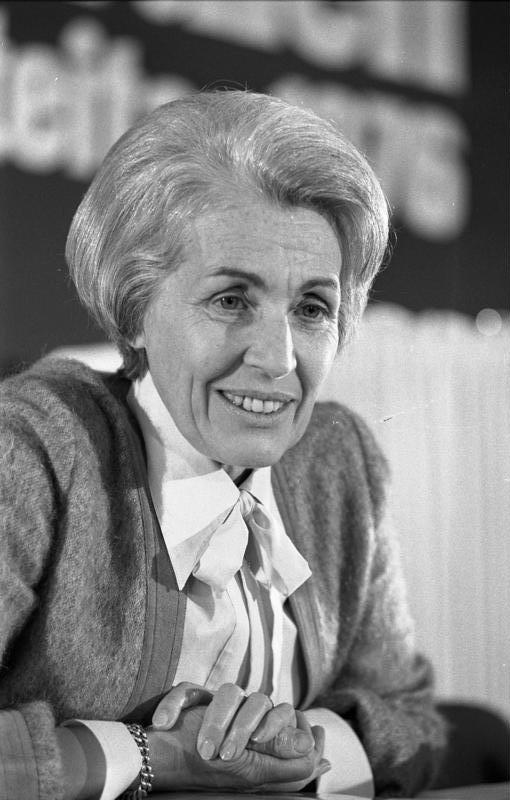
46. Hildegard Hamm-Brücher (11 May 1921 in Essen – 7 December 2016 in Munich)
  granted 1995
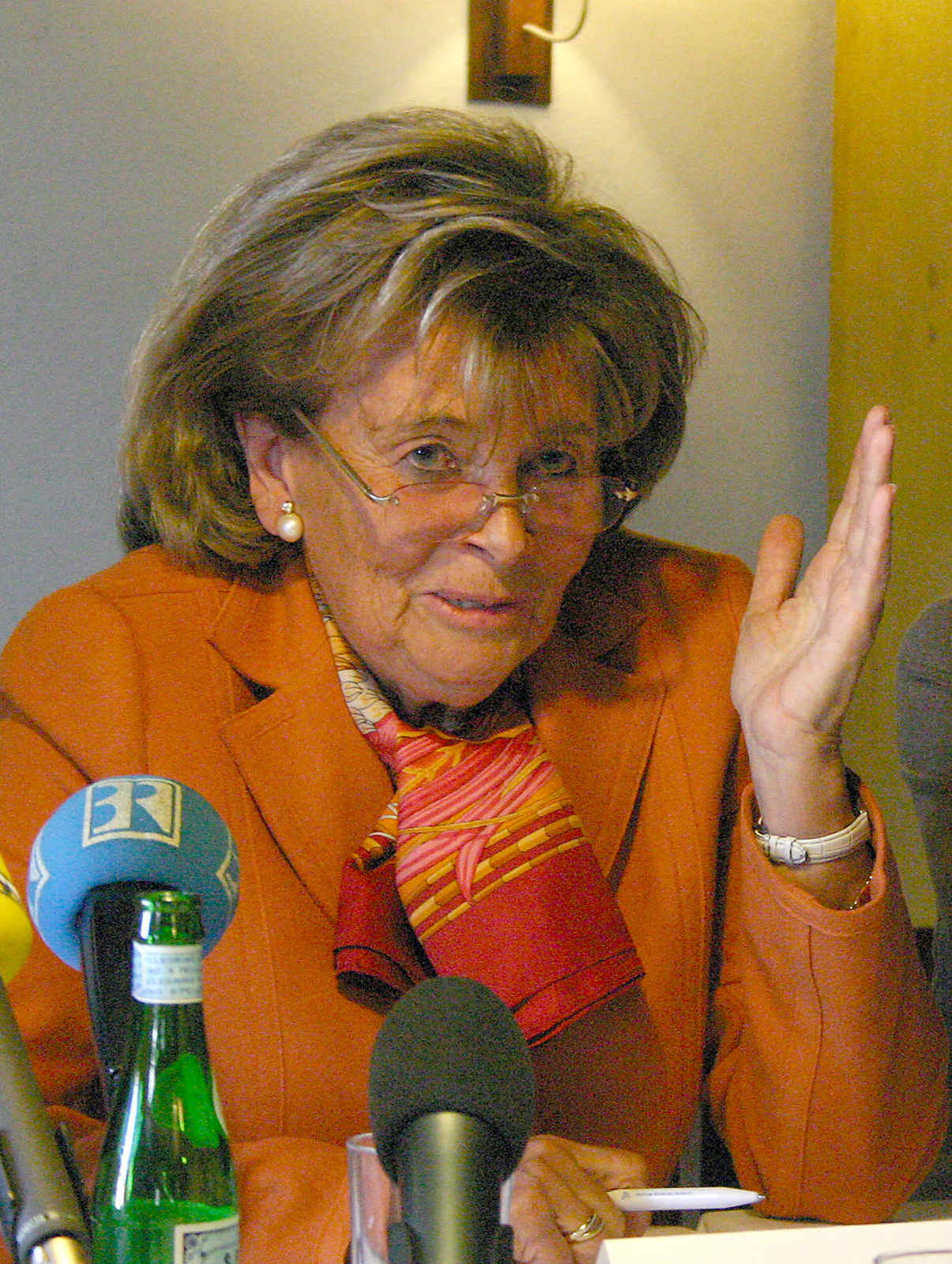
47. Charlotte Knobloch (born 29 October 1932 in Munich)
  granted 2005
48. Otto Meitinger (born 8 May 1927 in Munich)
  granted on the 7 November 2005
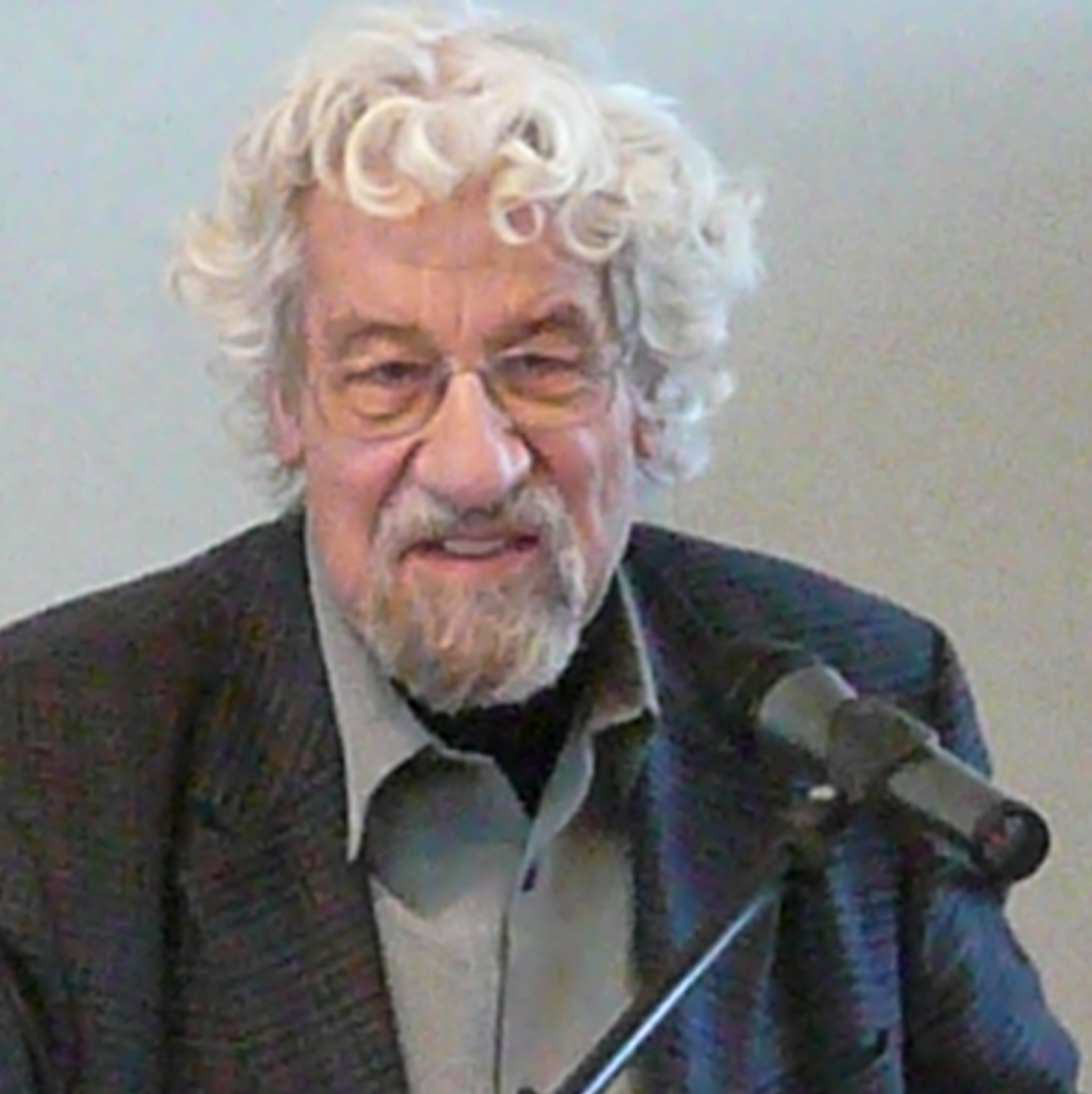
49. Hans-Peter Dürr (7 October 1929 in Stuttgart – 18 May 2014 in Munich)
  granted on the 25 January 2008
50. Gertraud Burkert (born 21 March 1940 in Munich)
  granted on the 21 February 2014
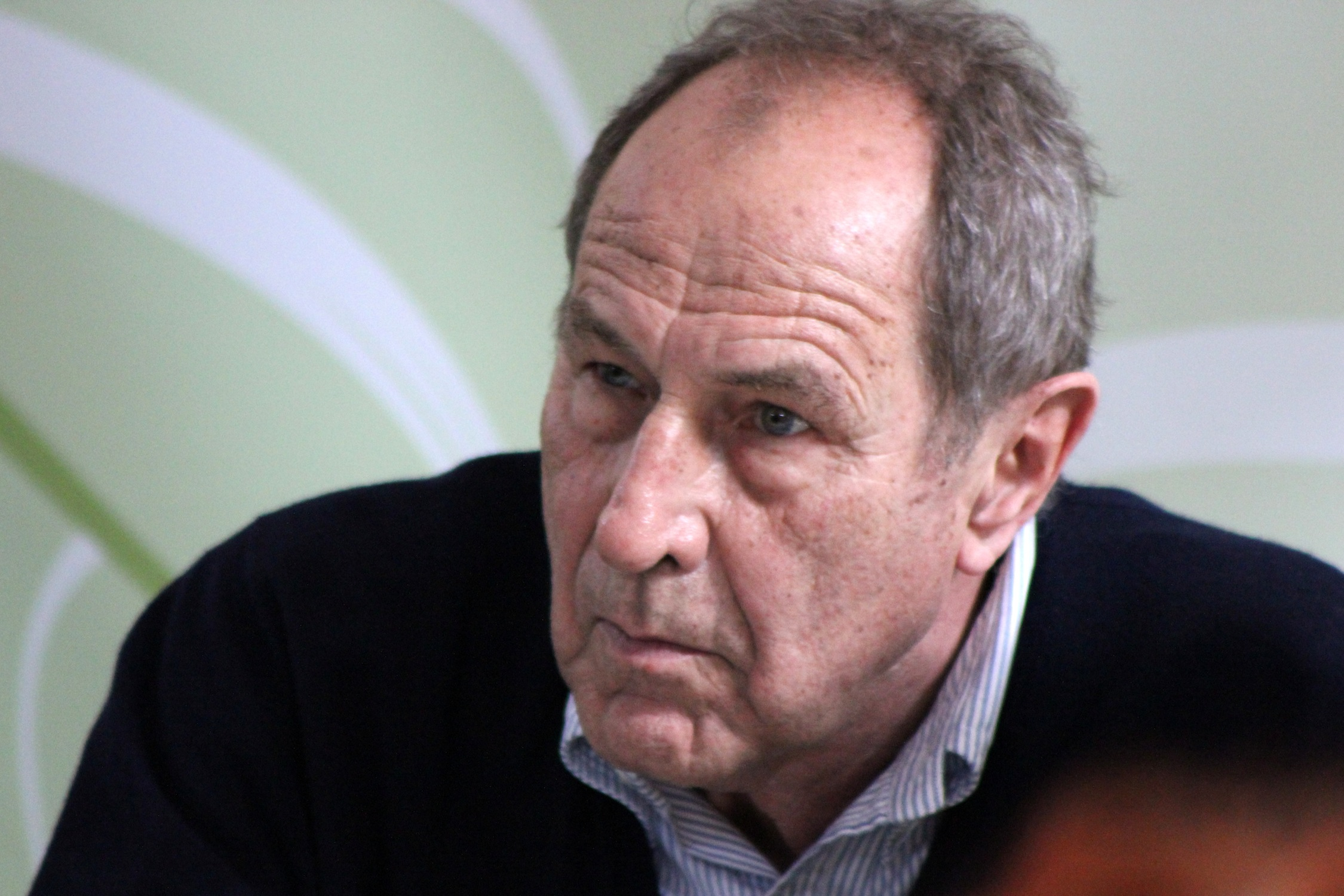
51. Michael Krüger (born 9 December 1943 in Wittgendorf)
  granted on the 21 February 2014
52. Bruno Reichart (born 18 January 1943 in Vienna)
  granted on the 21 February 2014
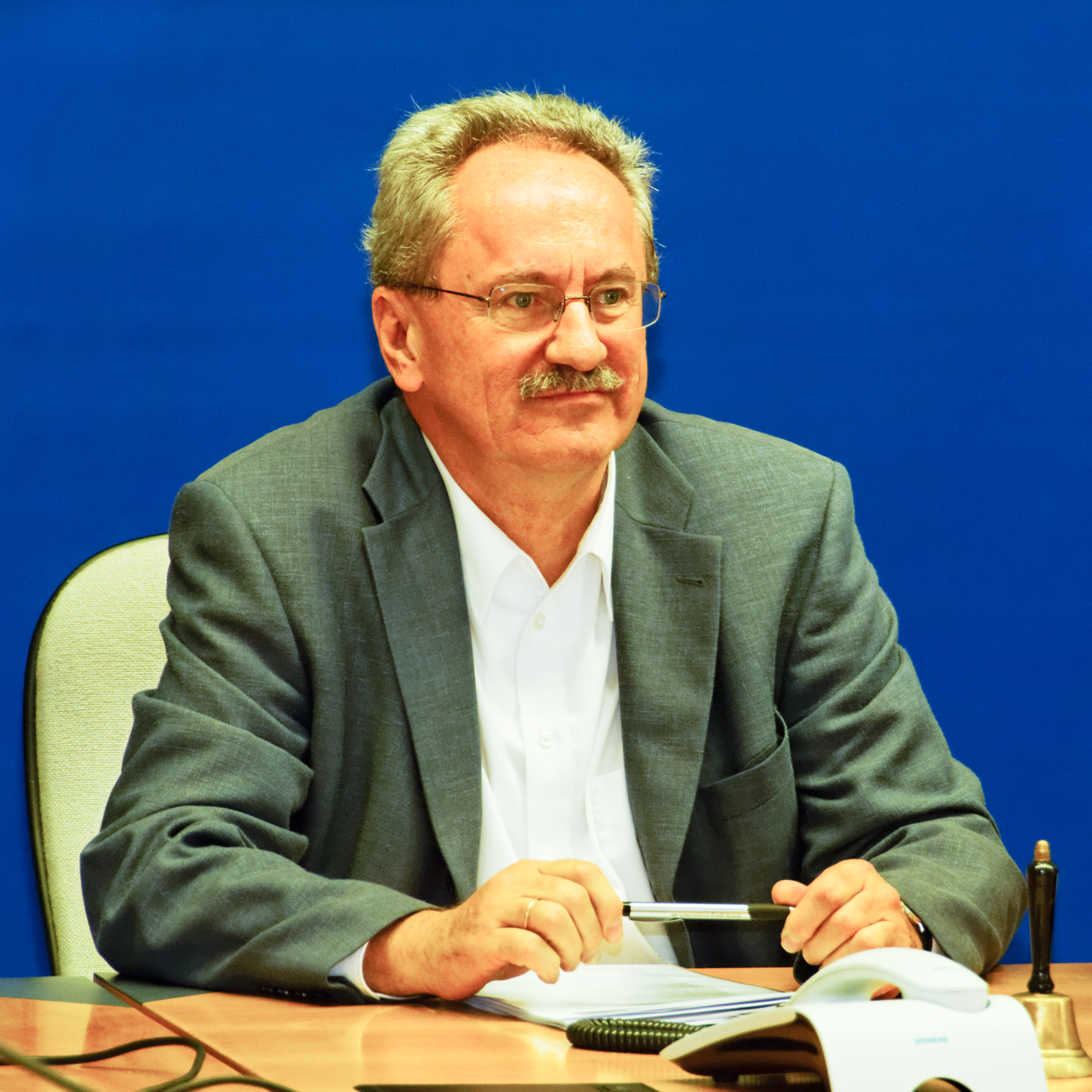
53. Christian Ude (born 26 October 1947 in Munich)
  granted on the 15 September 2014
