= Romereifeldgraben =

River in Germany

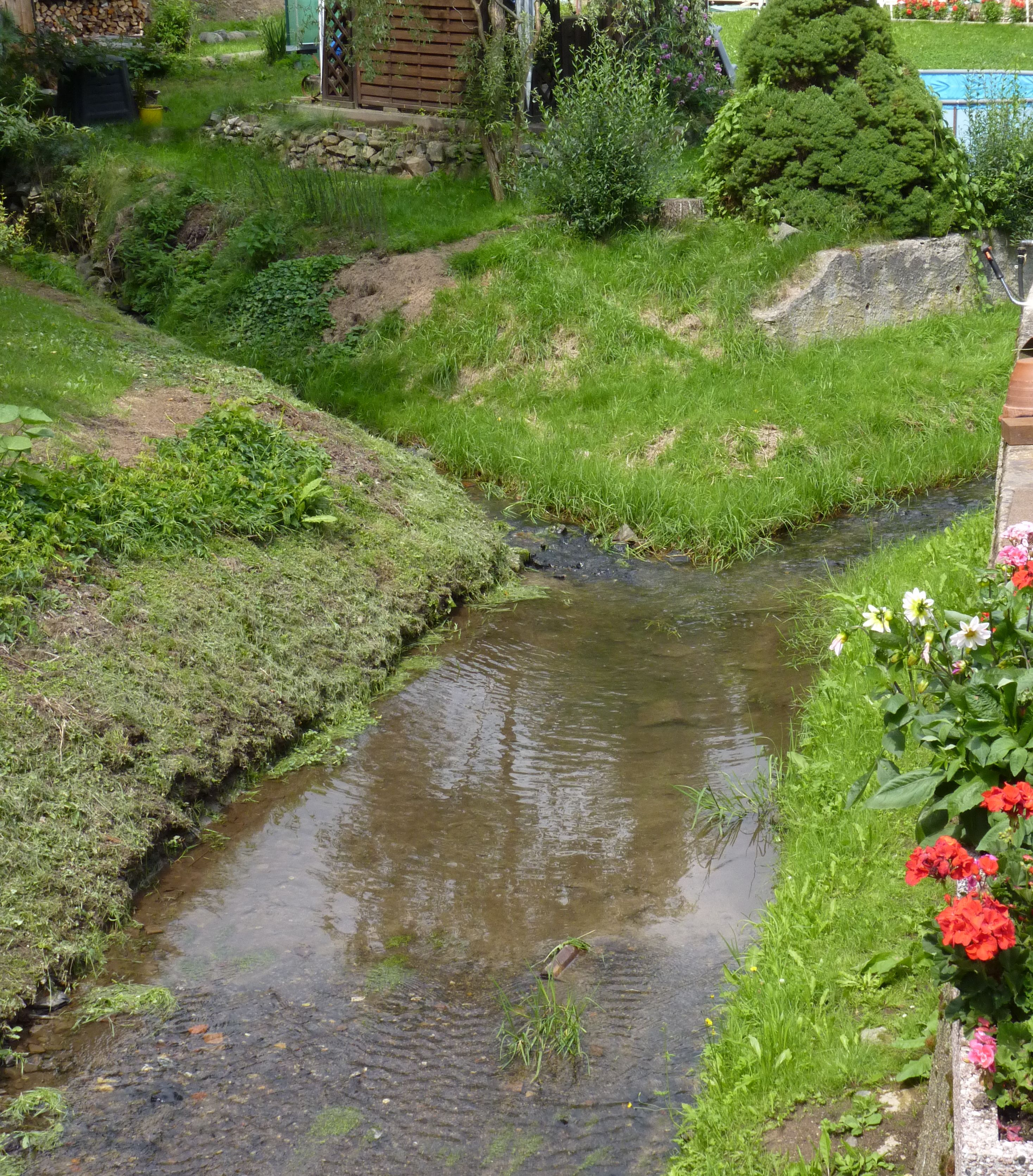

Location
- Country: Germany
- States: Saxony

Physical characteristics
- Mouth
  - location: Wittgendorfer Wasser
  - coordinates: 50.9451°N 14.8355°E

Basin features
- Progression: Wittgendorfer Wasser→ Lusatian Neisse→ Oder→ Baltic Sea

The Romereifeldgraben (Upper Sorbian: Romska łučna hrjebja) is a small river of Saxony, Germany. It flows into the Wittgendorfer Wasser near Zittau.

== See also ==
- List of rivers of Saxony
