= Bröckau =

- Ortsteil of Schnaudertal
- Interactive map of Bröckau
- Location within Germany Location within Saxony-Anhalt
- Coordinates: 50°58′N 12°13′E
- Country: Germany
- State: Saxony-Anhalt
- District: Burgenlandkreis
- Municipality: Schnaudertal

Area
  - Total: 7.9 km^{2} (3.1 sq mi)
- Elevation: 230–284 m (755–932 ft)

Population (2006-12-31)
  - Total: 390
  - Density: 49/km^{2} (130/sq mi)
- Time zone: UTC+01:00 (CET)
  - Summer (DST): UTC+02:00 (CEST)
- Postal codes: 06724
- Dialling codes: 034423
- Website: www.vgem-dzf.de

Bröckau (German pronunciation: [ˈbʁœkaʊ]) is a village and a former municipality in the Burgenlandkreis district, in Saxony-Anhalt, Germany. Since 1 January 2010, it is part of the municipality Schnaudertal.
