= Wittgendorfer Wasser =

River in Germany

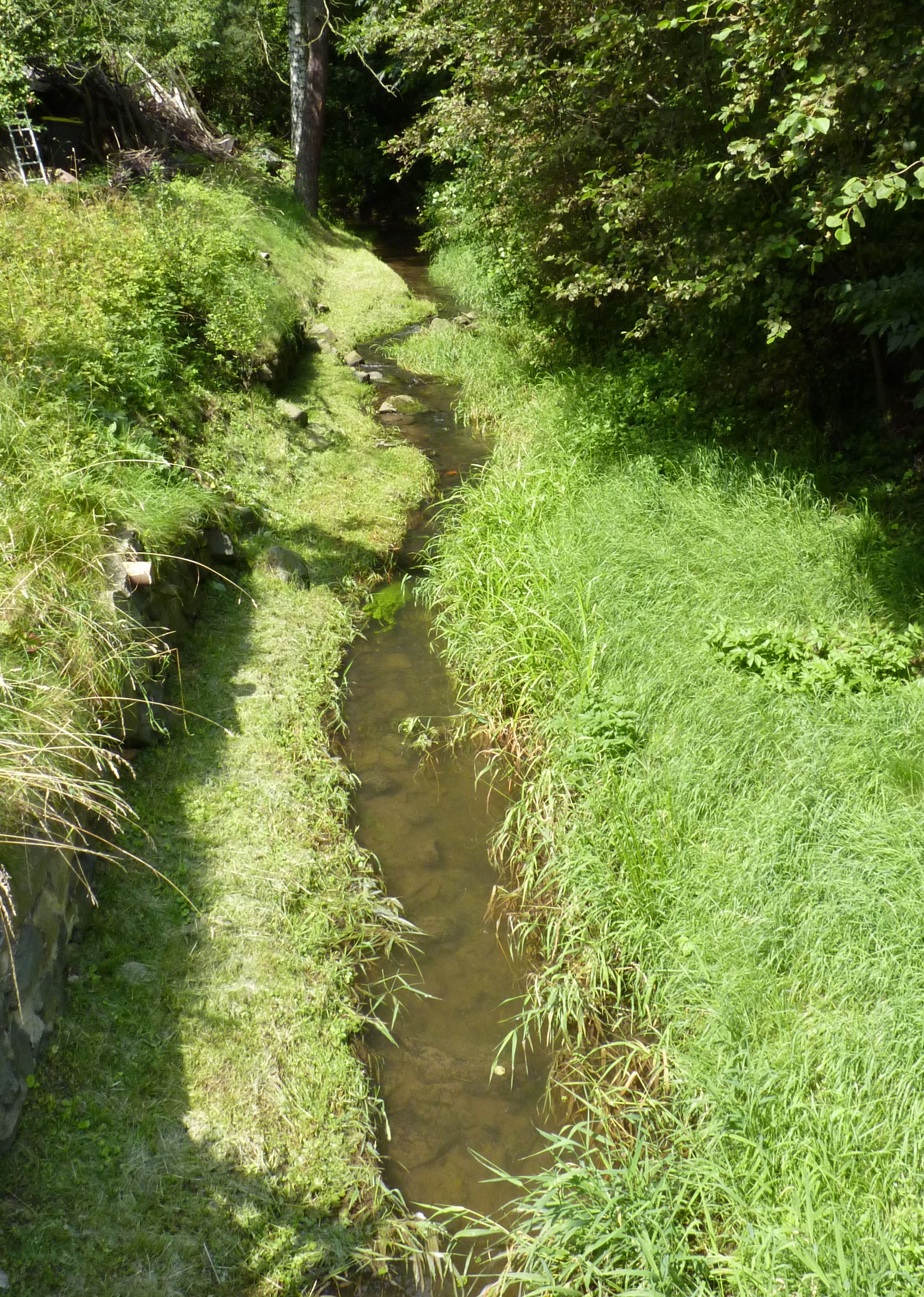

Location
- Country: Germany
- State: Saxony

Physical characteristics
- Mouth
  - location: Lusatian Neisse
  - coordinates: 50.9273°N 14.8735°E
- Length: 6.2km

Basin features
- Progression: Lusatian Neisse→ Oder→ Baltic Sea

The Wittgendorfer Wasser,(Upper Sorbian: Wittgendorfska woda) also known as the Wittgendorfer Bach, is a six-kilometer-long stream that flows through the village of Wittgendorf. It rises on the southwestern edge of the Oberwald forest, flows down the southwest slope of the Steinberg, and finally empties into the Lusatian Neisse north of Drausendorf. Along its course, the Wittgendorfer Wasser is fed by the Romereifeldgraben and other small streams. The banks of the stream are largely supported by pillars of pentagonal basalt.

Like many other streams and rivers in Upper Lusatia, the stream's water volume fluctuates greatly throughout the seasons. Due to the sparse forest cover in the surrounding area, flooding often occurred during heavy rainfall. The last major flood disaster is recorded for the night of May 17–18, 1887. Although it lasted only an hour, it claimed seven lives and caused 90,000 marks in damage.

Today, the stream's water is primarily used for firefighting operations. Special suction points have been dug for this purpose. However, use is usually not possible in summer, as the Wittgendorf water has very little water at this time of year.

== See also ==
- List of rivers of Saxony
