= Schnaudertal =

- Municipality
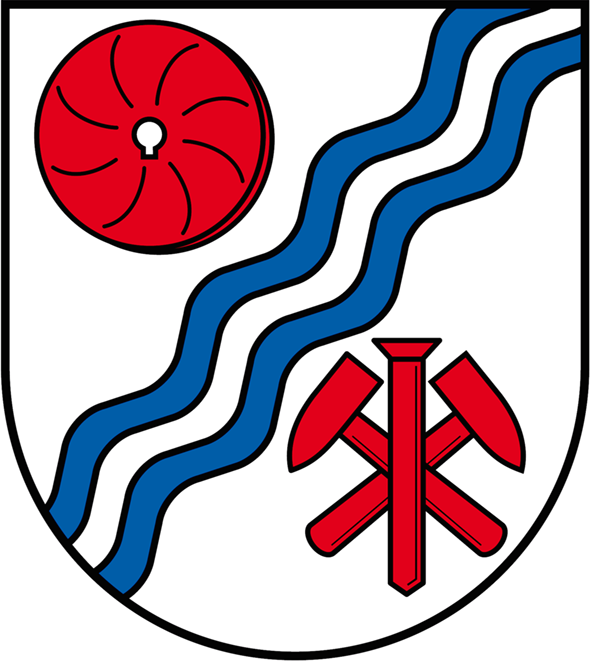
- Coat of arms

- Location of Schnaudertal within Burgenlandkreis district
- Interactive map of Schnaudertal
- Location within Germany Location within Saxony-Anhalt
- Coordinates: 50°58′N 12°12′E
- Country: Germany
- State: Saxony-Anhalt
- District: Burgenlandkreis
- Municipal assoc.: Droyßiger-Zeitzer Forst

Government
  - Mayor (2023–30): Hans-Hubert Schulze

Area
  - Total: 20.73 km^{2} (8.00 sq mi)

Population (2025-12-31)
  - Total: 863
  - Density: 41.6/km^{2} (108/sq mi)
- Time zone: UTC+01:00 (CET)
  - Summer (DST): UTC+02:00 (CEST)
- Postal codes: 06724
- Dialling codes: 034423
- Vehicle registration: BLK
- Website: www.vgem-dzf.de

Schnaudertal (German pronunciation: [ˈʃnaʊdɐtaːl], lit. 'Schnauder Valley') is a municipality in the Burgenlandkreis district, in Saxony-Anhalt, Germany. It was formed on 1 January 2010 by the merger of the former municipalities Bröckau and Wittgendorf.
