= Franz Xaver von Gietl =

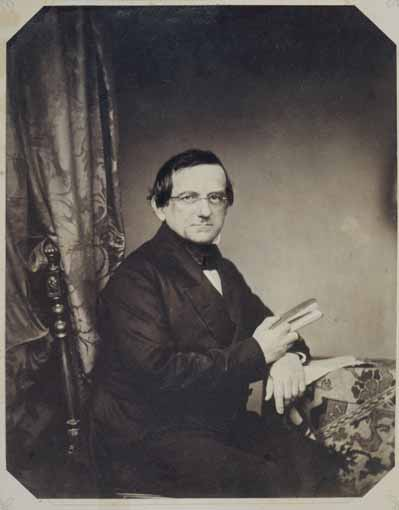
- Franz Xaver von Gietl
- Born: 27 August 1803; Höchstädt an der Donau
- Died: 19 March 1888 (aged 84)
- Education: Ludwig-Maximilians-Universität München
- Medical career
- Profession: physician
- Institutions: Personal physician to Maximilian II of Bavaria, Ludwig-Maximilians-Universität München, Municipal Clinic of Munich (Klinikum links der Isar)
- Research: fevers, esp.Cholera and Typhoid fever

Franz Xaver Ritter von Gietl (27 August 1803 – 19 March 1888) was a German medical doctor.

== Life ==
Gietl studied medicine at the Ludwig-Maximilians-Universität in Landshut, the University of Würzburg, and the Ludwig-Maximilians-Universität München (successor of Ludwig-Maximilians-Universität after moving to Munich). In 1827, he received his doctorate from the Ludwig-Maximilians-Universität München with a pathological work on neuro ganglia.

In 1831, he was sent by the government to examine the cholera in Bohemia, Moravia and Silesia. In 1834, he was appointed to the post of the personal physician to the then crown prince and later king Maximilian II of Bavaria. In addition, in 1838, he became professor at the Ludwig-Maximilians-Universität München and from 1842 to 1851 Director of the Municipal Clinic of Munich (Klinikum links der Isar). With the end of the winter semester 1885/1886, he retired as lecturer due to his advancing heart disease.

Gietls work focussed on Cholera and Typhoid fever esp. clinical observations and their treatment. In addition, he published on Erysipelas and statistical observations at the Municipal Clinic.

On the occasion of his 80th birthday in 1883, he became the 11th Honorary Citizen of Munich (comp. List of honorary citizens of Munich).

== Works ==
- Gietl, Franz Xaver von (1865). Die Ursachen des enterischen Typhus in München (in German). Leipzig: Engelmann. "Die Ursachen des enterischen Typhus in München."
- Gietl, Franz Xaver von (1875). Die Grundzüge meiner Lehren über Cholera und Typhus (in German). Munich: J.A. Finsterlin'sch.
- Gietl, Franz Xaver von (1855). Die Cholera : Nach Beobachtungen auf d. I. medicin. Klinik u. Abtheilung im städt. Hospital zu München (in German). Munich: Kaiser.
