= Wittgendorf =

- Ortsteil of Schnaudertal
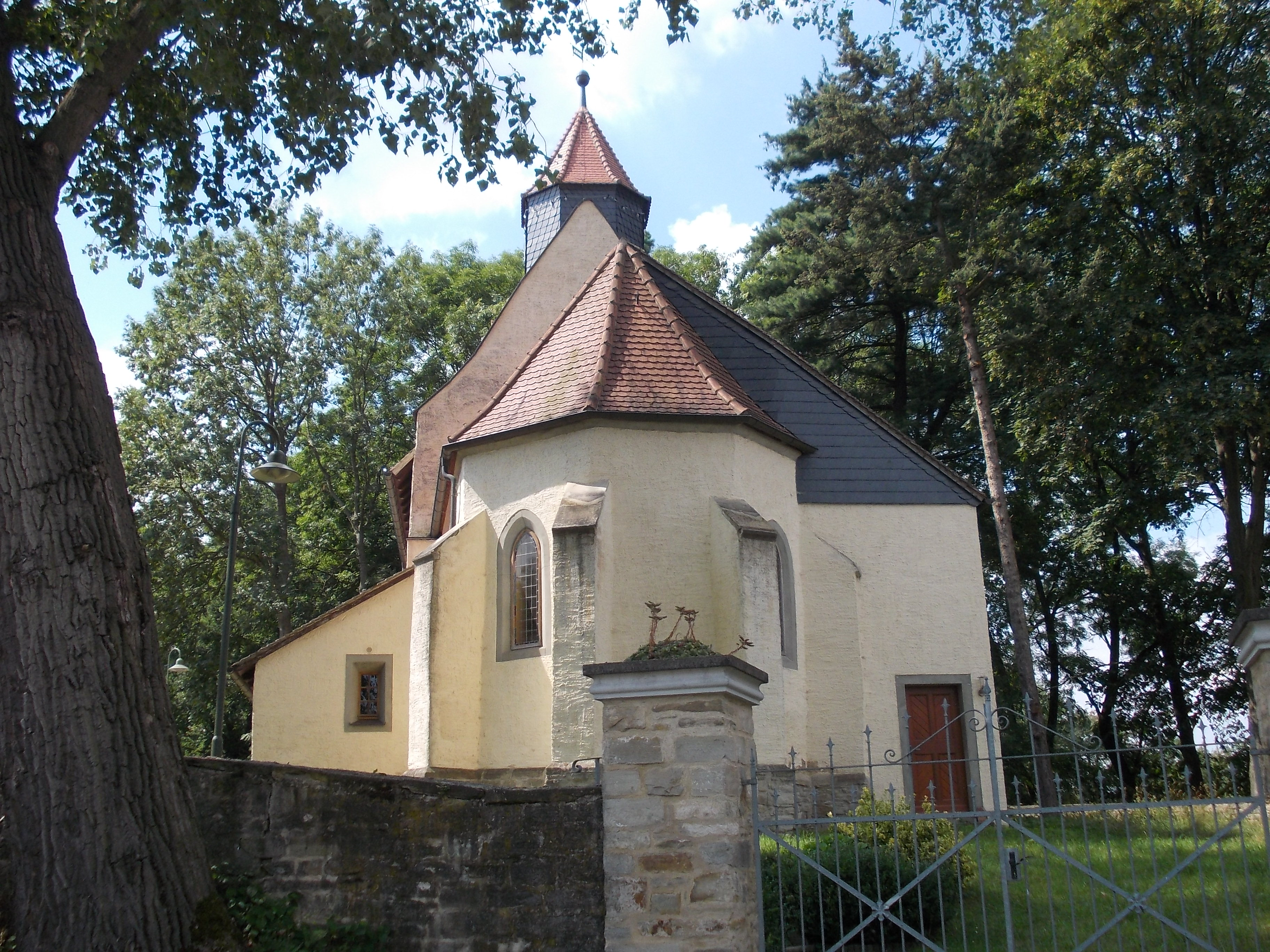
- Church in Wittgendorf
- Interactive map of Wittgendorf
- Location within Germany Location within Saxony-Anhalt
- Coordinates: 50°59′N 12°12′E
- Country: Germany
- State: Saxony-Anhalt
- District: Burgenlandkreis
- Municipality: Schnaudertal

Area
  - Total: 12.81 km^{2} (4.95 sq mi)
- Elevation: 273 m (896 ft)

Population (2008)
  - Total: 664
  - Density: 51.8/km^{2} (134/sq mi)
- Time zone: UTC+01:00 (CET)
  - Summer (DST): UTC+02:00 (CEST)
- Postal codes: 06712
- Dialling codes: 034423
- Vehicle registration: BLK
- Website: www.vgem-dzf.de

Wittgendorf (German pronunciation: [ˈvɪtɡn̩dɔʁf]) is a village and a former municipality in the Burgenlandkreis district, in Saxony-Anhalt, Germany. Since 1 January 2010, it is part of the municipality Schnaudertal.
