= Kleine Luppe =

River in Germany

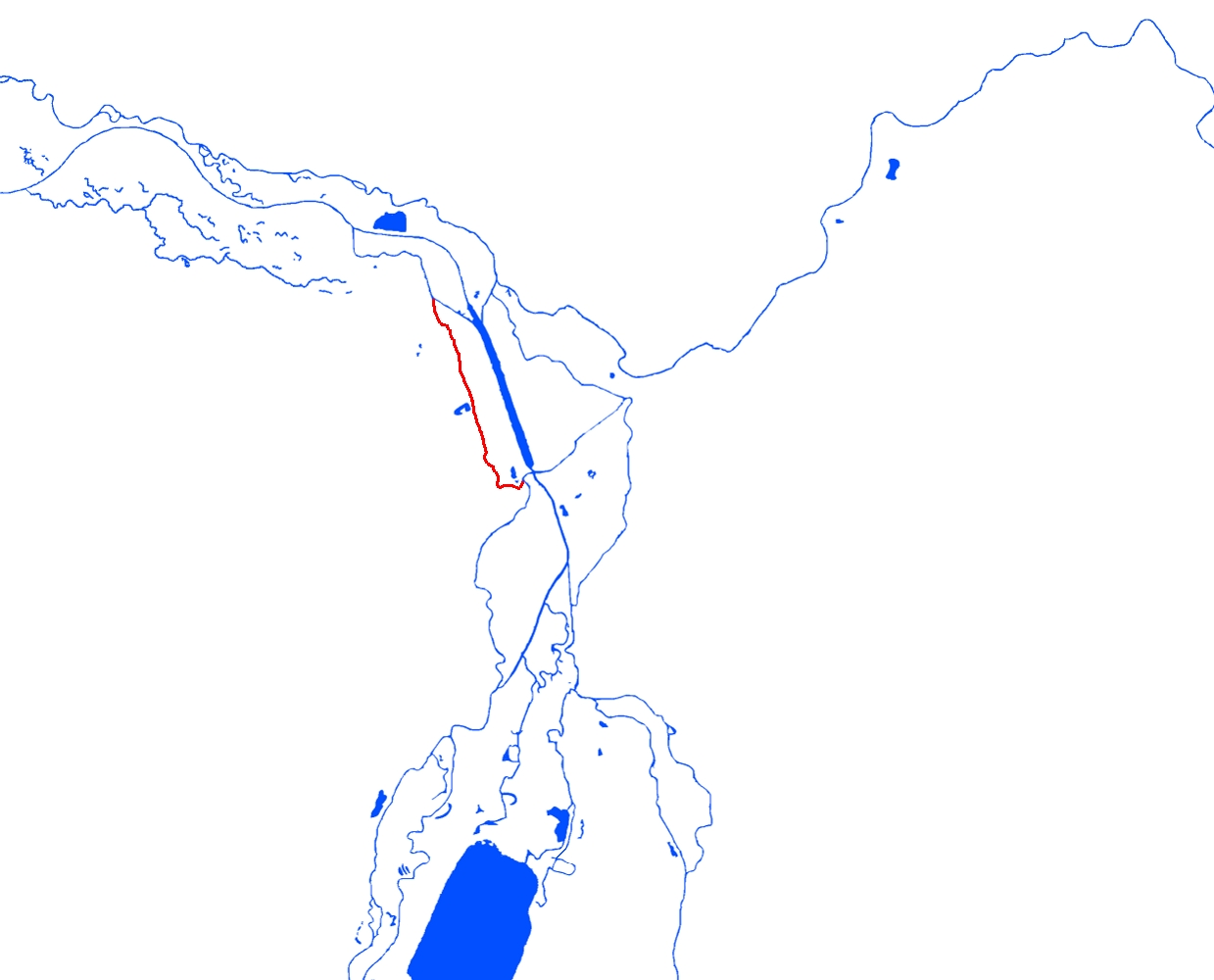
- The Leipziger Gewässerknoten with the Kleine Luppe (in red)

Location
- Country: Germany
- State: Saxony

Physical characteristics
- Mouth
  - location: At Leutzsch into the Nahle
  - coordinates: 51.3589°N 12.3278°E

Basin features
- Progression: Nahle→ Neue Luppe→ White Elster→ Saale→ Elbe→ North Sea

The Kleine Luppe is one of the numerous tributaries of the Weiße Elster in its anastomosing course (often referred to as an inland delta.) It flows entirely within the city limits of Leipzig and is legally classified as a first-order watercourse.

== See also ==
- List of rivers of Saxony
- Bodies of water in Leipzig
