= Luppe =

River in Germany

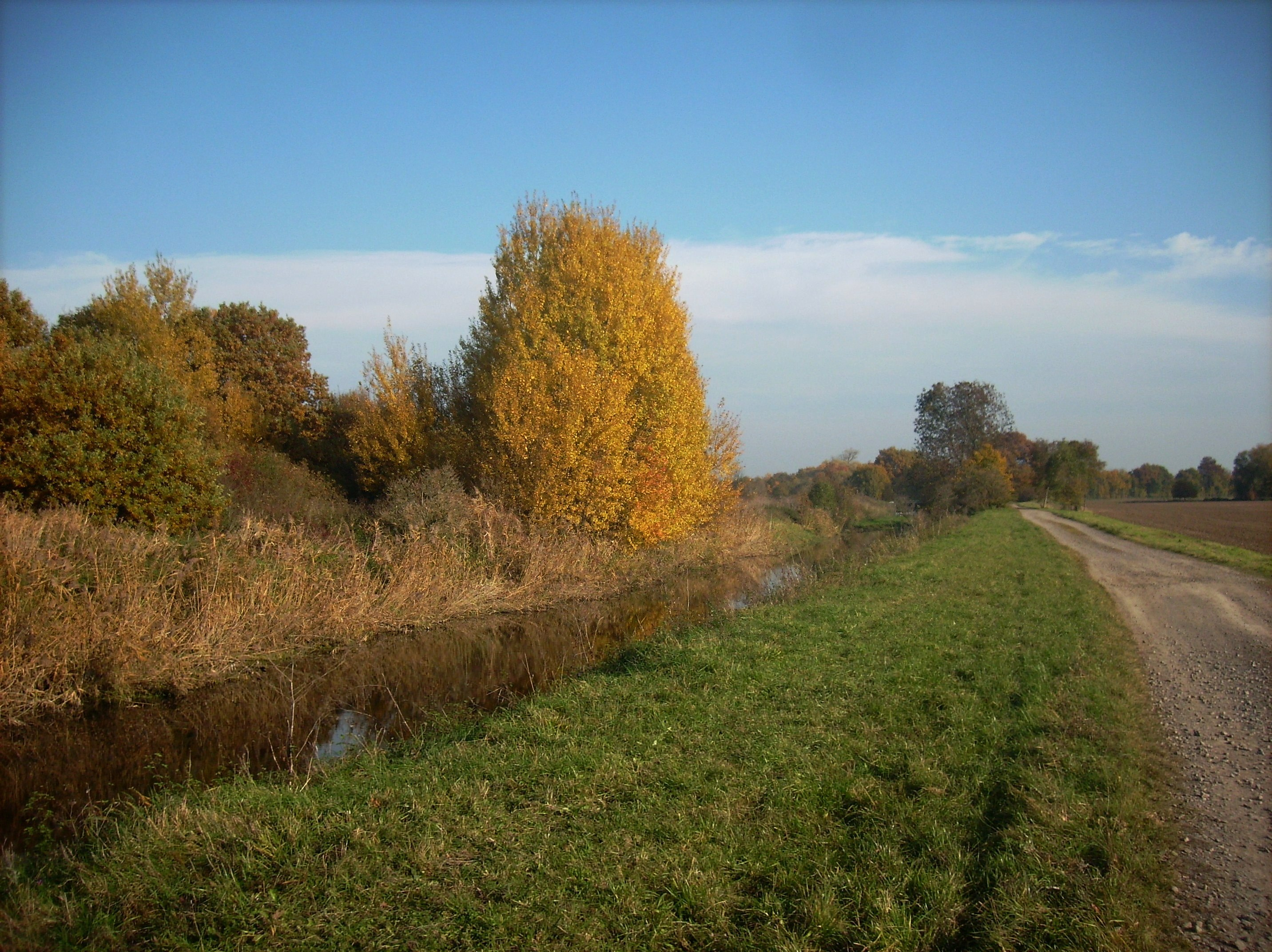

Location
- Country: Germany
- State: Saxony-Anhalt

Physical characteristics
- Source
  - location: near Kleinliebenau
  - coordinates: 51.3793°N 12.2066°E
- Mouth
  - location: Saale
  - coordinates: 51.3906°N 11.9953°E

Basin features
- Progression: Saale→ Elbe→ North Sea

Luppe is a river of Saxony and Saxony-Anhalt, Germany. It lies in the floodplain around the confluence of the rivers Saale and White Elster, near the cities Leipzig and Halle. It flows into the Saale in Schkopau. Until the 1930s, when the Neue Luppe was constructed, the Luppe was a distributary of the White Elster. The Nahle and the Alte Luppe are relicts of the former course of the Luppe. The remaining Luppe flows from near Kleinliebenau to the west, and no longer receives water from its former upper course.

== See also ==
- List of rivers of Saxony
- List of rivers of Saxony-Anhalt
