= Burgauenbach =

River in Germany

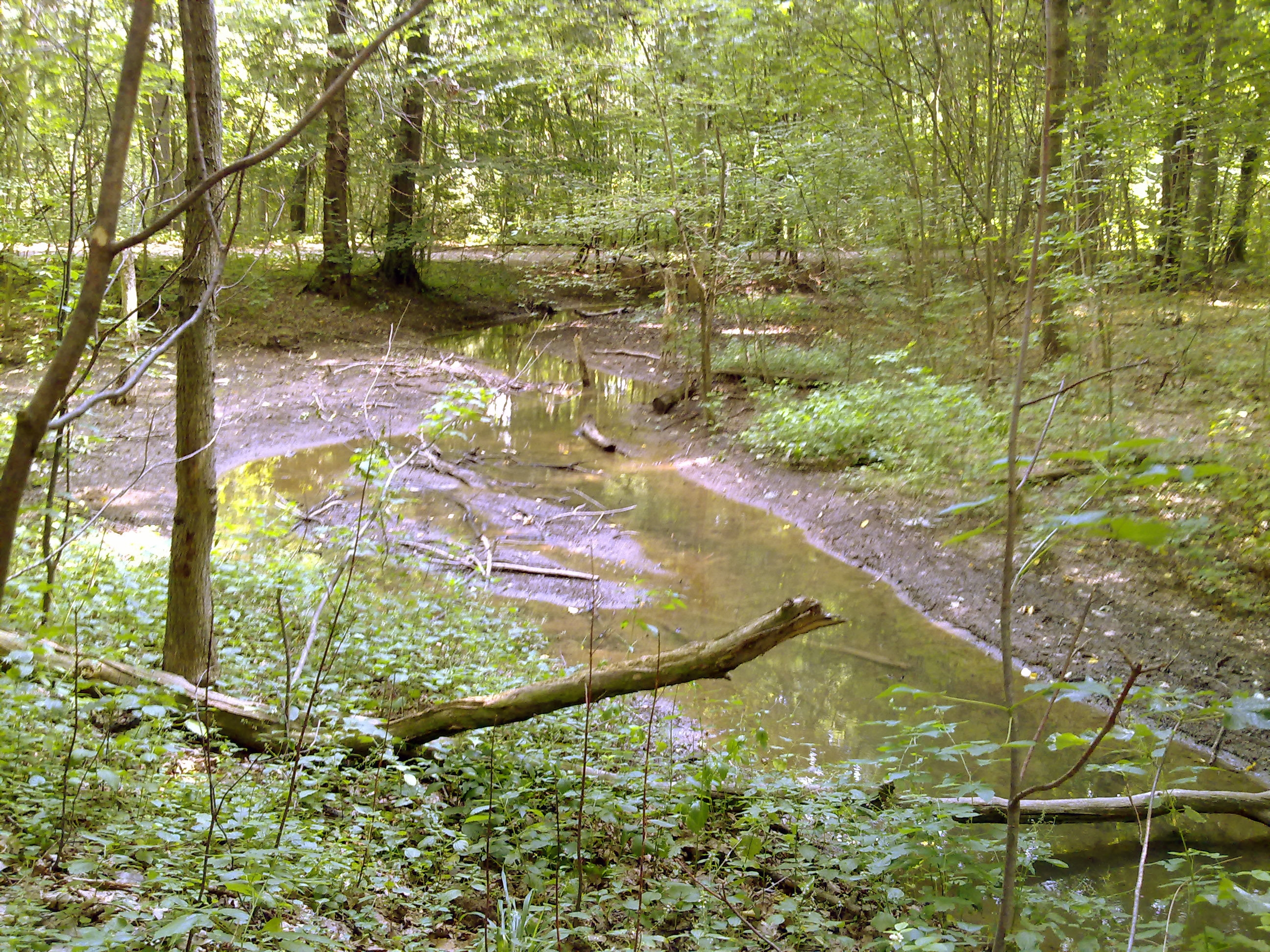

Location
- Country: Germany
- State: Saxony

Physical characteristics
- Mouth
  - coordinates: 51.3700°N 12.2883°E

Basin features
- Progression: Bauerngraben→ Neue Luppe→ White Elster→ Saale→ Elbe→ North Sea

Burgauenbach is a river of Saxony, Germany. It is 5.4 km (3.4 mi) long and flows into the Bauerngraben in Lützschena-Stahmeln.

== See also ==
- List of rivers of Saxony
