= Leutzsch =

- Stadtteil of Leipzig
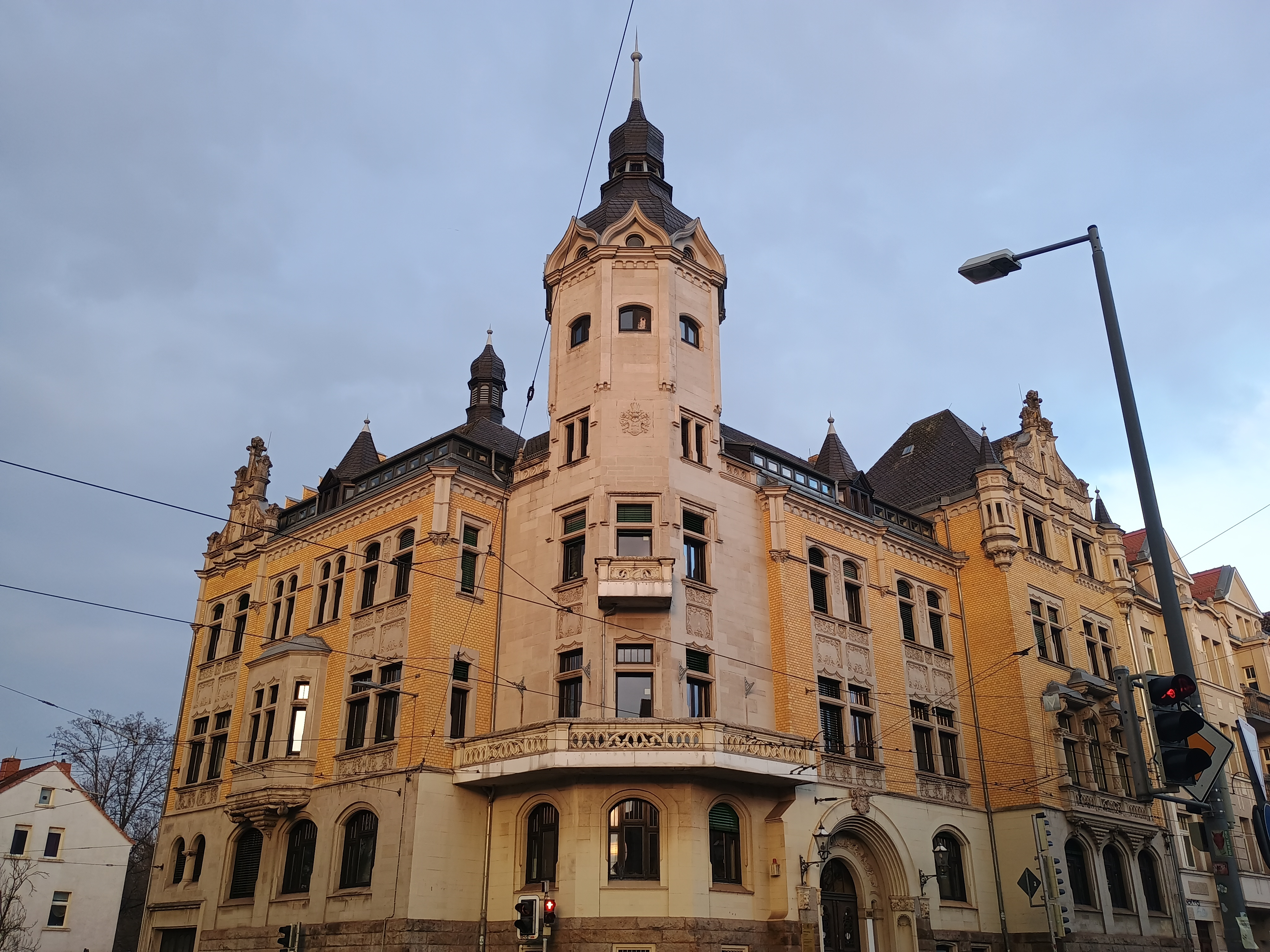
- Interactive map of Leutzsch
- Location within Germany Location within Saxony
- Coordinates: 51°20′52″N 12°18′50″E
- Country: Germany
- State: Saxony
- District: Urban district
- City: Leipzig

Area
  - Total: 4.53 km^{2} (1.75 sq mi)

Population (2024-12-31)
  - Total: 11,047
  - Density: 2,440/km^{2} (6,320/sq mi)
- Time zone: UTC+01:00 (CET)
  - Summer (DST): UTC+02:00 (CEST)
- Postal codes: 04179
- Dialling codes: 0341

Leutzsch (German pronunciation: [ˈlɔʏtʃ]) is a western locality of Leipzig in Saxony, Germany. It is part of the borough Alt-West. It is characterized by residential areas from the Wilhelminian period, an Art Nouveau villa colony and mostly disused industrial plants. Some of them have found new life as artist studios.

Leutzsch was an independent municipality of about 15,000 inhabitants, until it was incorporated into Leipzig in 1922. Leutzsch is home to the Alfred-Kunze-Sportpark, home of BSG Chemie Leipzig and formerly of FC Sachsen Leipzig.

== Position ==
Leutzsch is located about 5 km (3 mi) west-northwest of Leipzig city center. It borders Lindenau to the south (with Prießnitzstrasse, the Lindenau cemetery and Merseburger Strasse as borders), and Böhlitz-Ehrenberg to the west (border at Ludwig-Hupfeld-Strasse, Leutzsch train station, Am Ritterschlößchen and Am Sportpark). To the north and east it borders the Leipzig Riverside Forest, with the forest Leutzscher Holz, the Burgaue, the Nahle and the Kleine Luppe. A little north of Leutzsch is the lake Auensee, which belongs to the neighboring quarter of Wahren. The commercial area on Schomburgkstraße is in the Leutzsch quarter, but is counted as part of the statistical district of Neulindenau.

== History ==
=== Early development as a village ===
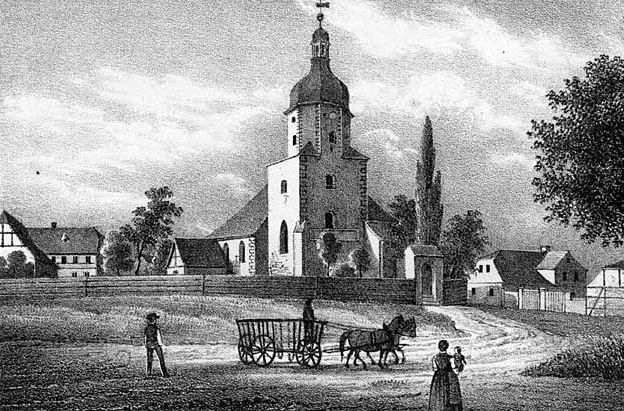
Village church of Leutzsch around 1850

The place name is of Slavic origin: Łuč'e is derived from łuka, which means 'meadow' in Old Sorbian. The settlement has probably existed since the Old Sorbian conquest of the land in the 8th century. The original village center was located on today's Am Tanzplan street. In the 11th century, German farmers also settled there. The village was first mentioned in documents under the name Luszh in 1285, when Margrave Frederick Tuta von Landsberg sold it to the Bishop of Merseburg. Ten years later, he enfeoffed the knight Heinricus de Lvitz (Heinrich von Leutzsch) with the Leutzscher Sattelhof. A chapel dedicated to the Virgin Mary was elevated to the village church of St. Laurentius in 1397.

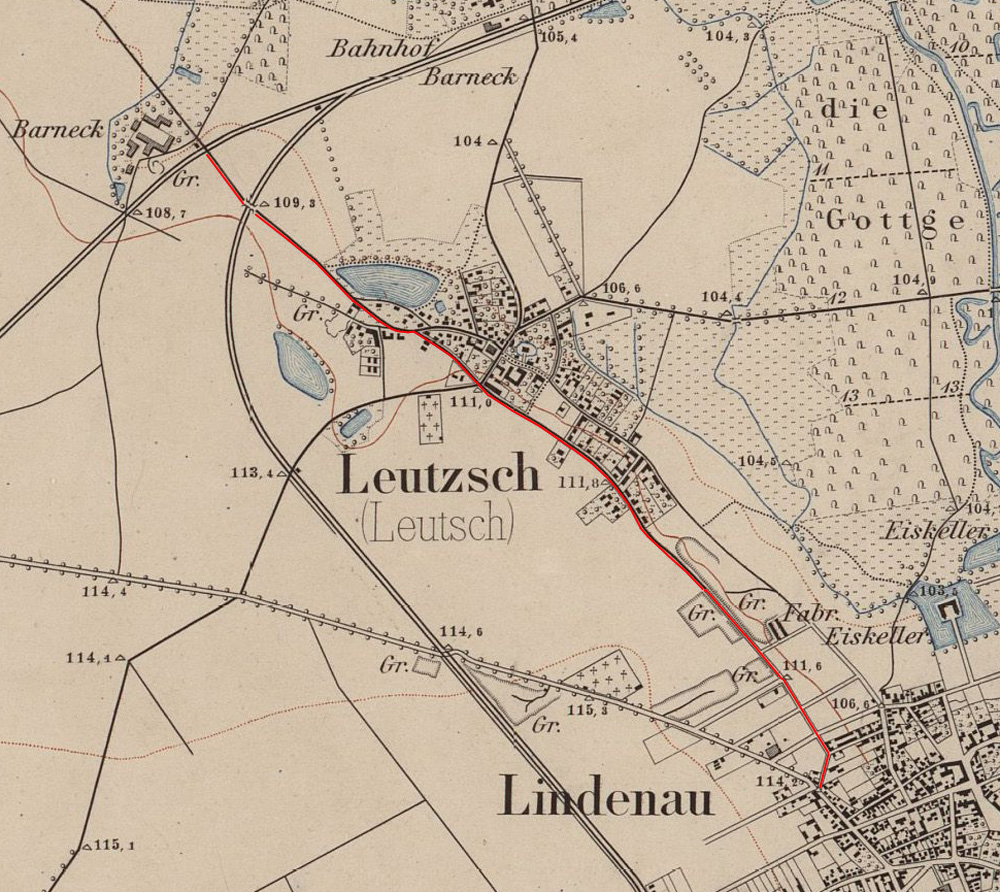
Leutzsch on a map from 1879

From 1539, the council of the city of Leipzig held the manorial lordship in Leutzsch. From 1562, however, it was administratively subordinate to the Amt Schkeuditz in the Bishopric of Merseburg. This in turn had been under the sovereignty of the Electorate of Saxony since 1561 and belonged to the secundogeniture principality of Saxe-Merseburg between 1656/57 and 1738. The population in 1562 was given as 23 hufners. During the Thirty Years' War, Swedish troops burned down the village.

In place of the old estate, a manor house was built around 1700, which was surrounded by a moat and therefore bore the popular name "Wasserschloss" (demolished in 1970, the area is now a park). In 1764, Leutsch recorded 15 2/3 hectares of land and 36 men and 8 Crofters. By resolution of the Congress of Vienna, the western part of the Amt Schkeuditz was ceded to Prussia in 1815. Leutzsch and the eastern part remained with the Kingdom of Saxony and was incorporated into the Kreisamt Leipzig. In 1834, Leutzsch recorded 402 inhabitants.

The coat of arms of the Lords of Leutzsch shows a linden tree with roots and crown, surrounded by two five-leaf roses. It was the municipal coat of arms until 1890. It can still be seen today at the entrance to the Leutzsch town hall.

== Population ==
Year	Inhabitants
2000	8.383
2005	8.439
2010	8.752
2015	10.028
2020	10.450
2024	11.047

== Buildings ==
Important buildings in Leutzsch are:

- St. Lawrence Church (St. Laurentius Kirche - Protestant church) in baroque style.
- St. Theresa Church (catholic church).
- Leutzsch Town Hall (now Leutzsch Citizens’ Office) in Renaissance Revival style, built 1903 / 04.
- Administrative Court of Leipzig (Verwaltungsgericht Leipzig) in the former villa of the fur trader Curt Thorer.
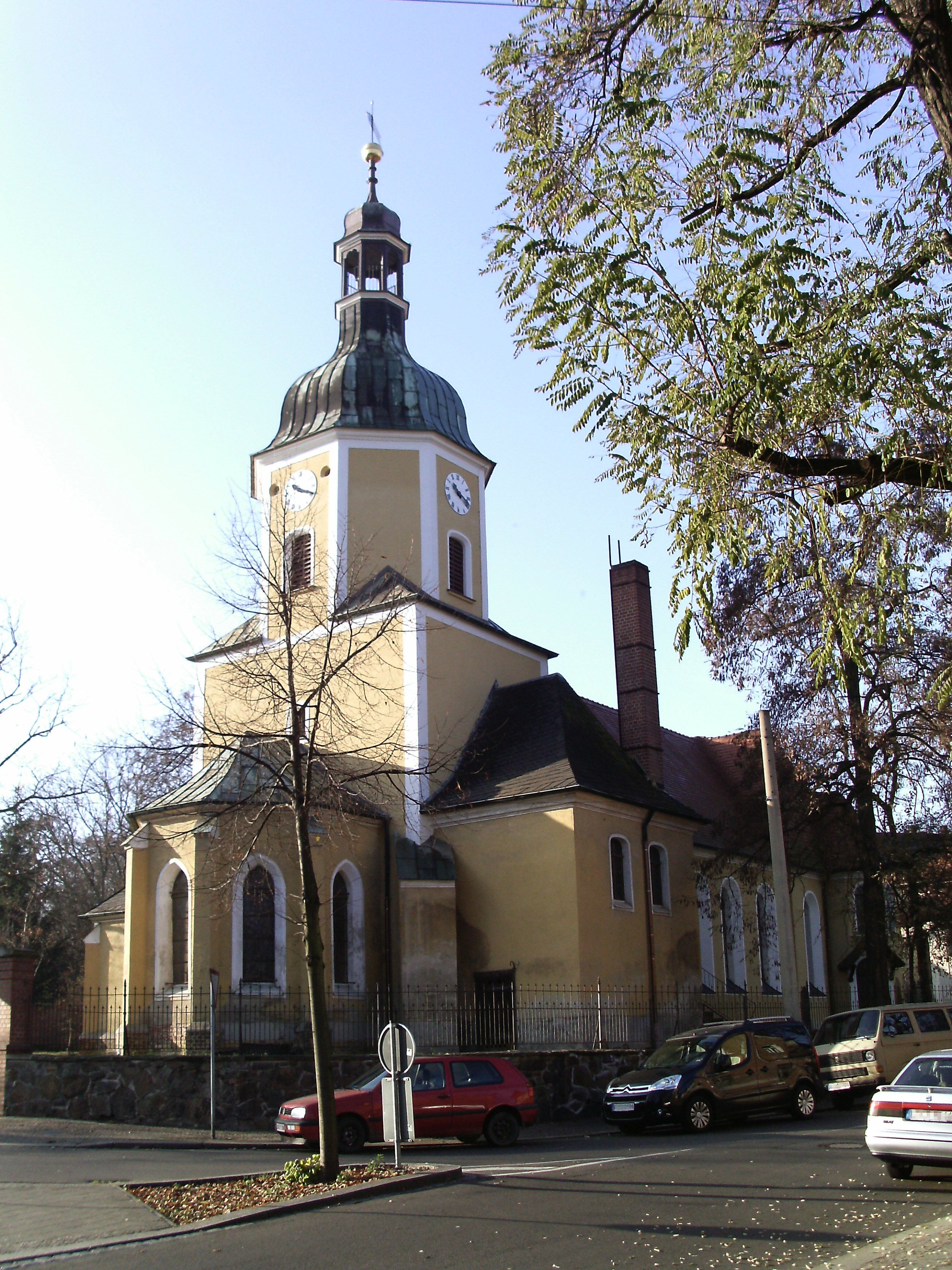
St. Lawrence Church (St.-Laurentius-Kirche)

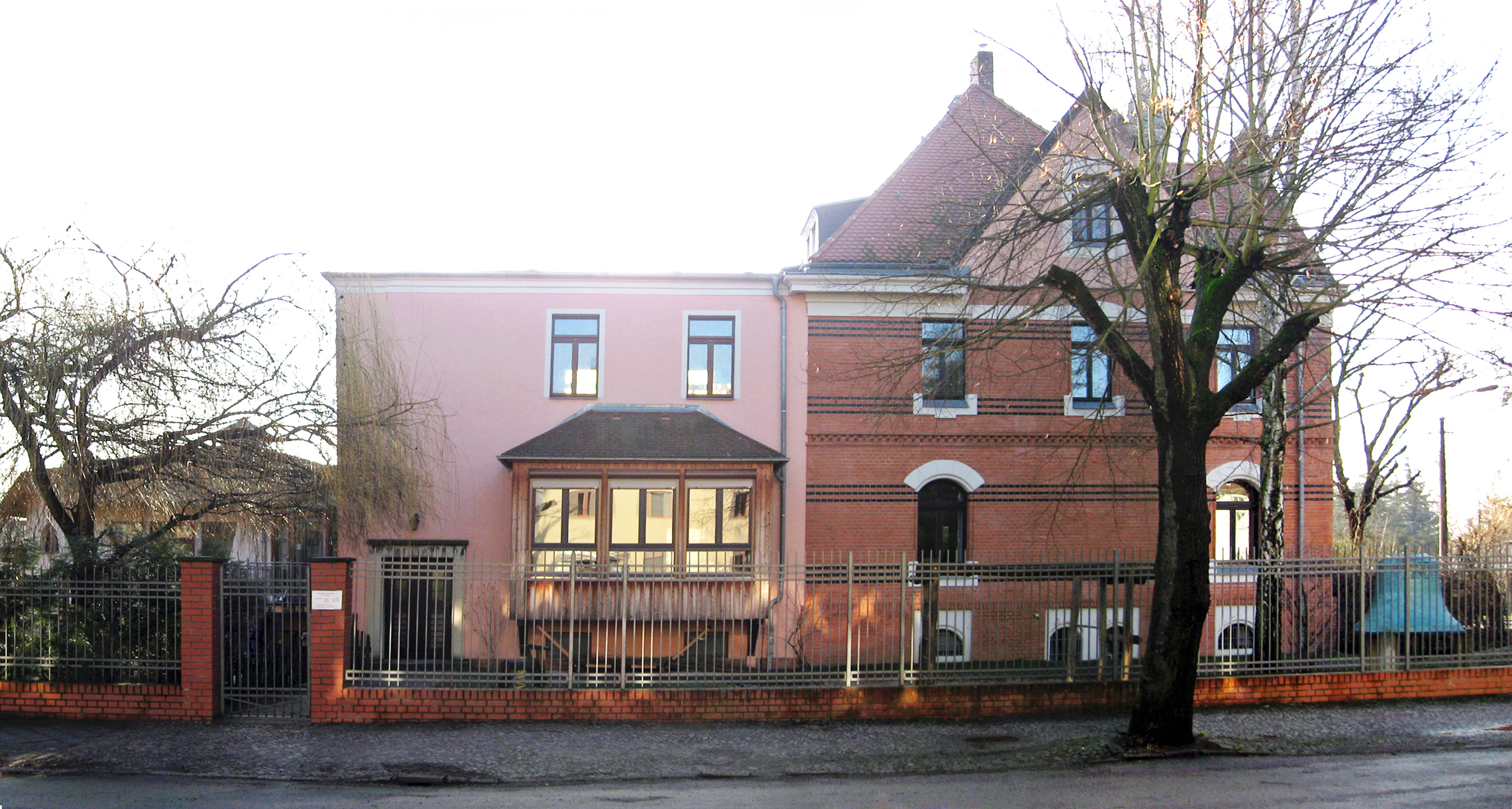
St. Theresia Church (St.-Theresia-Kirche)

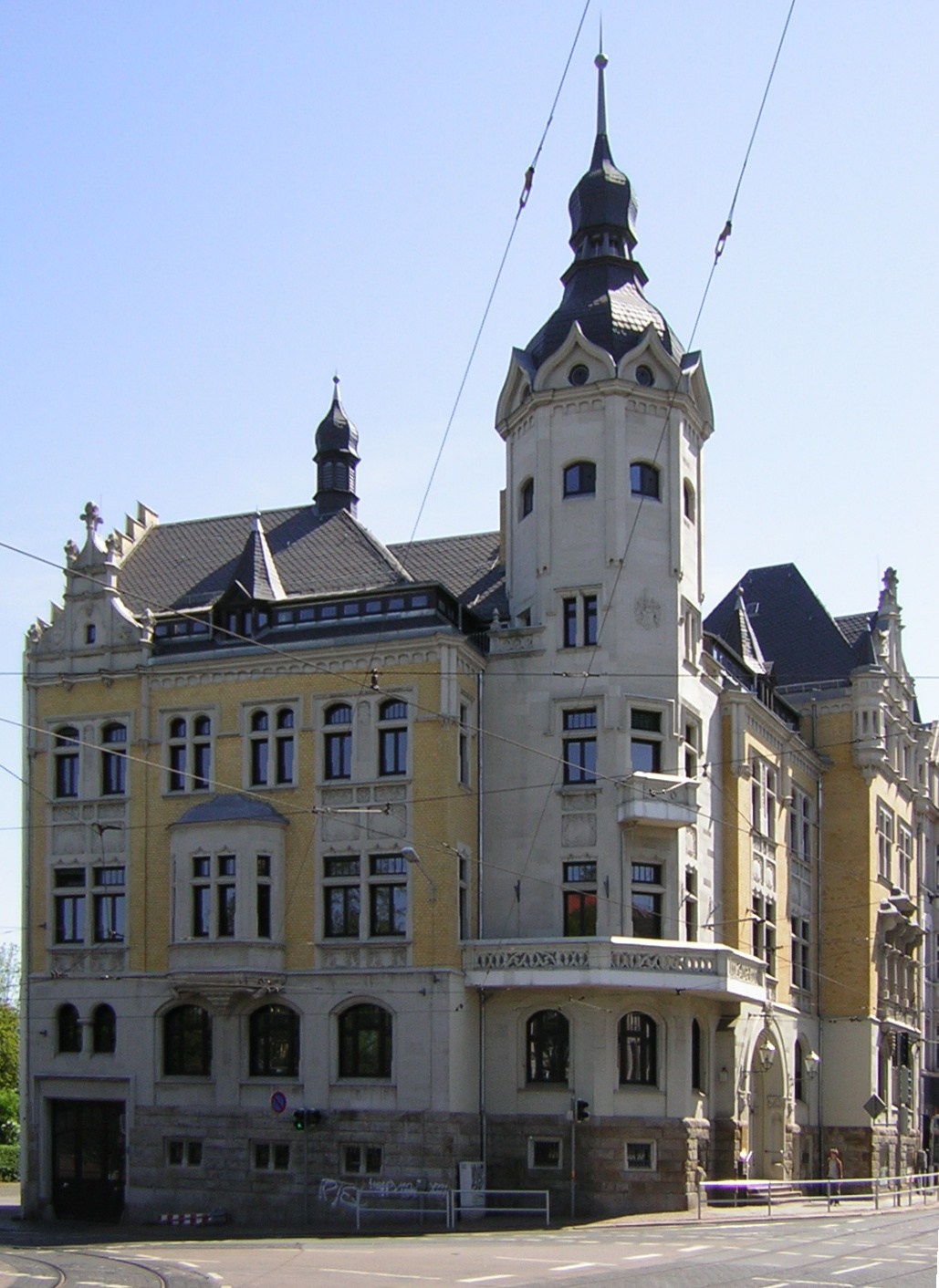
Leutzsch Town Hall

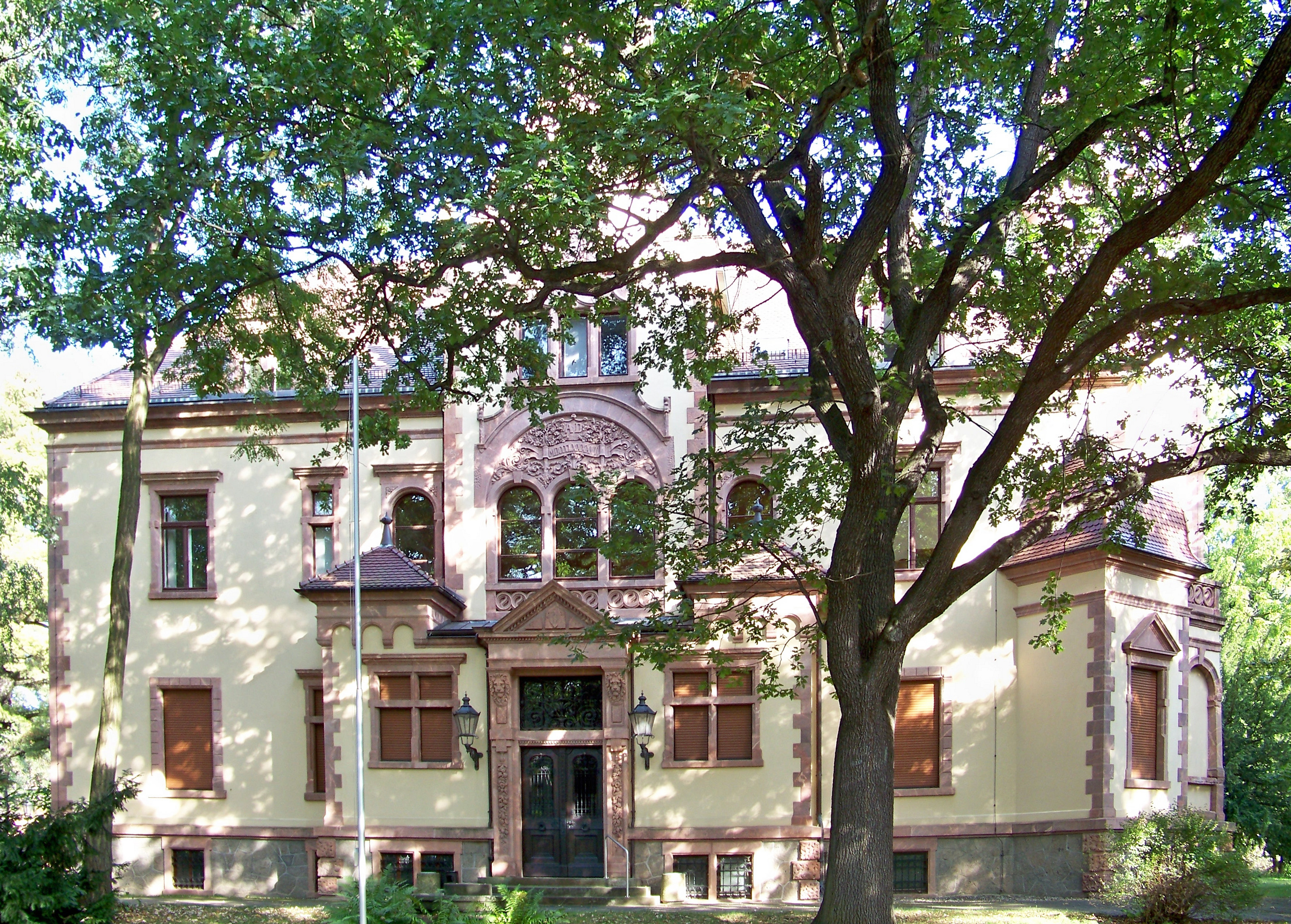
Administrative Court Leipzig (Verwaltungsgericht Leipzig)

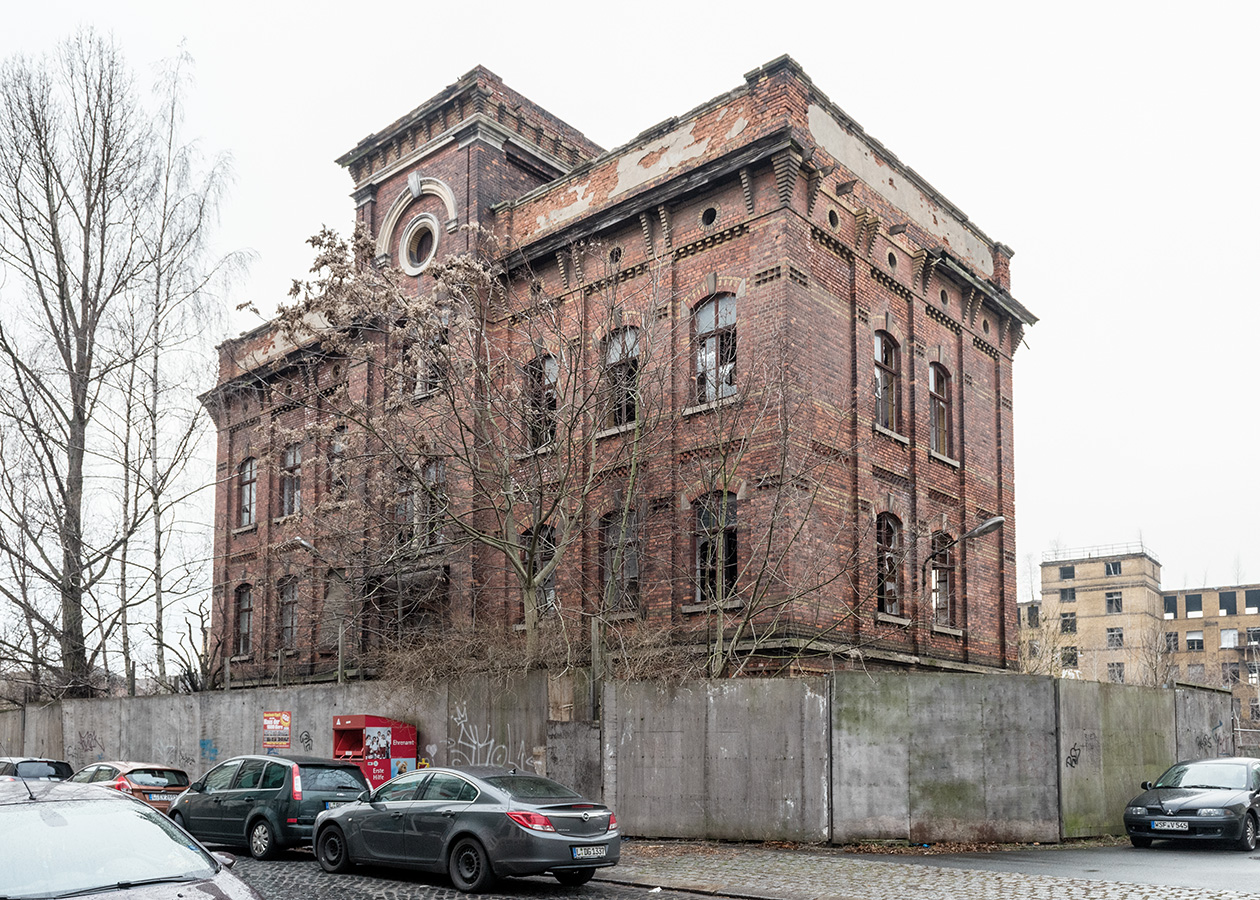
Former Pianoforte mechanism factory H. F. Flemming

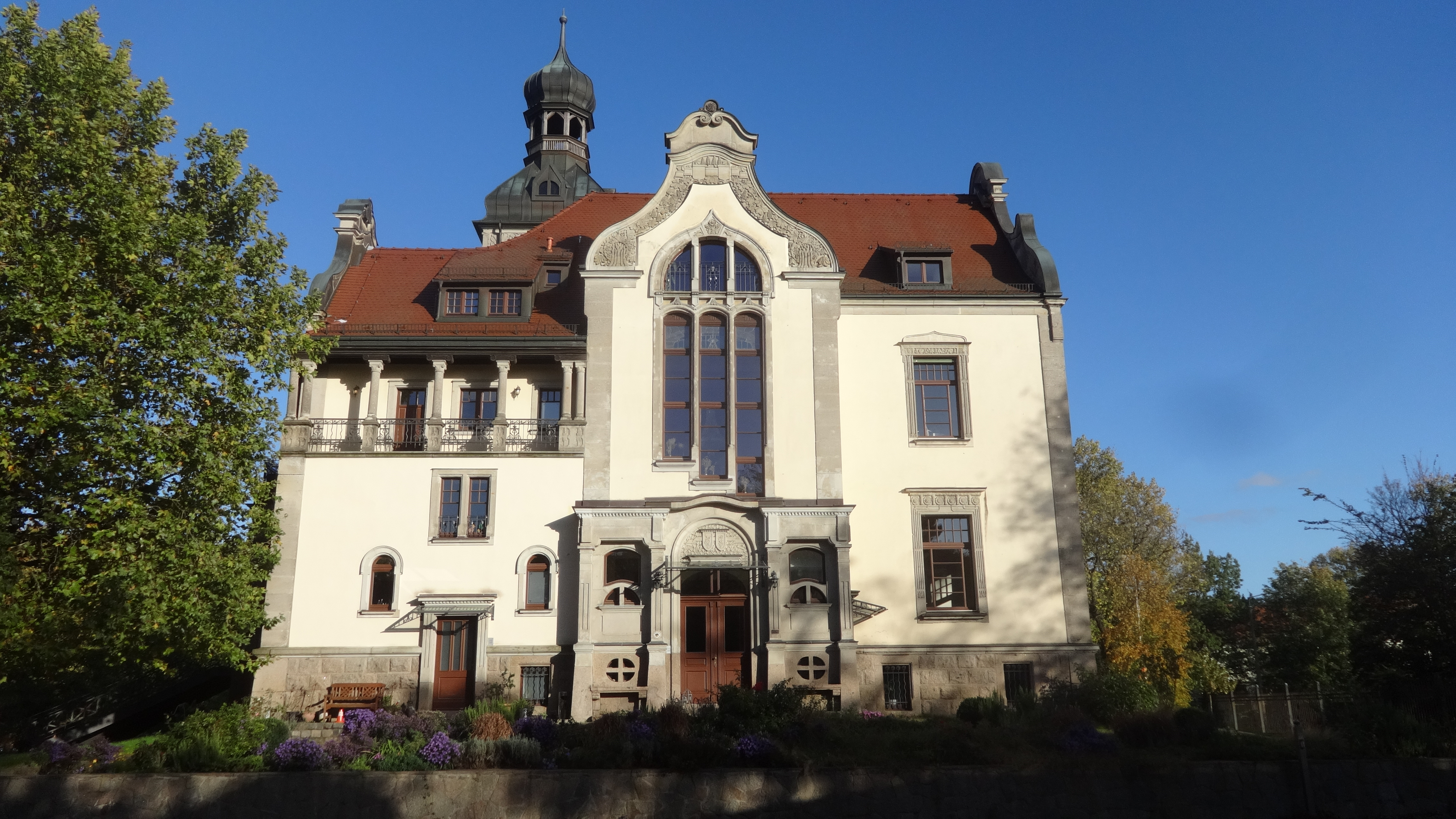
Villa Maedler

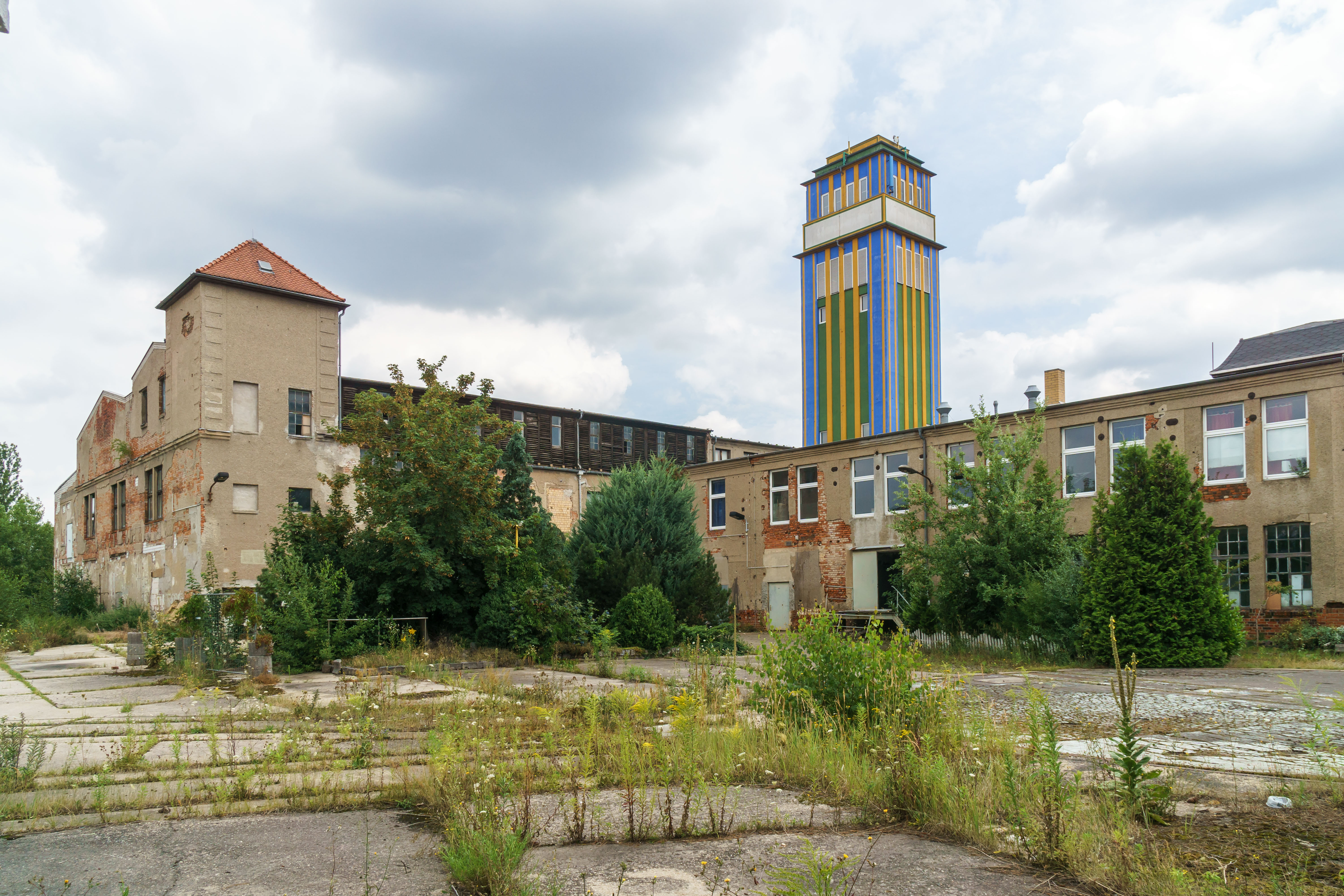
Water tower of the former Lacufa works

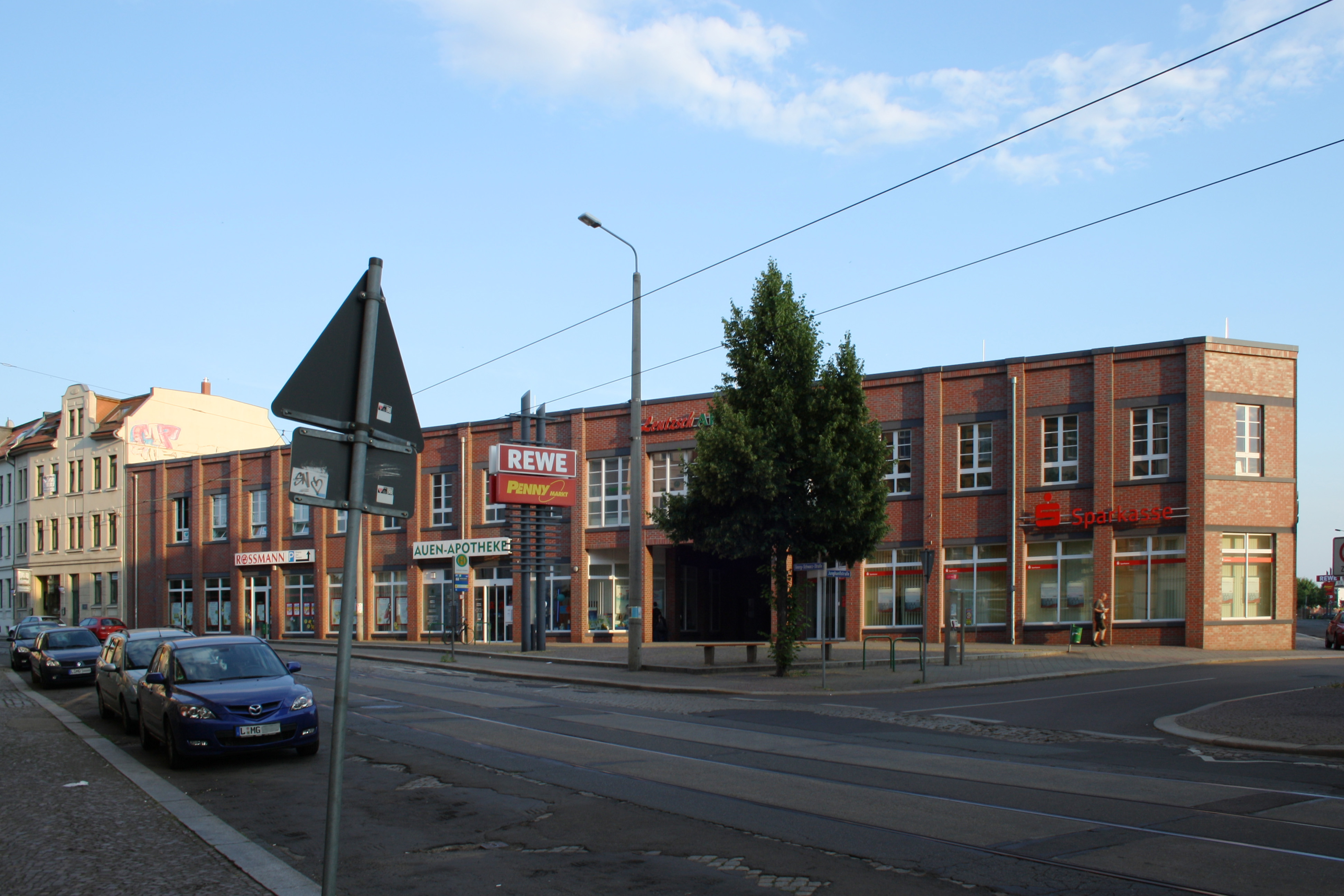
Leutzsch Arkaden shopping center

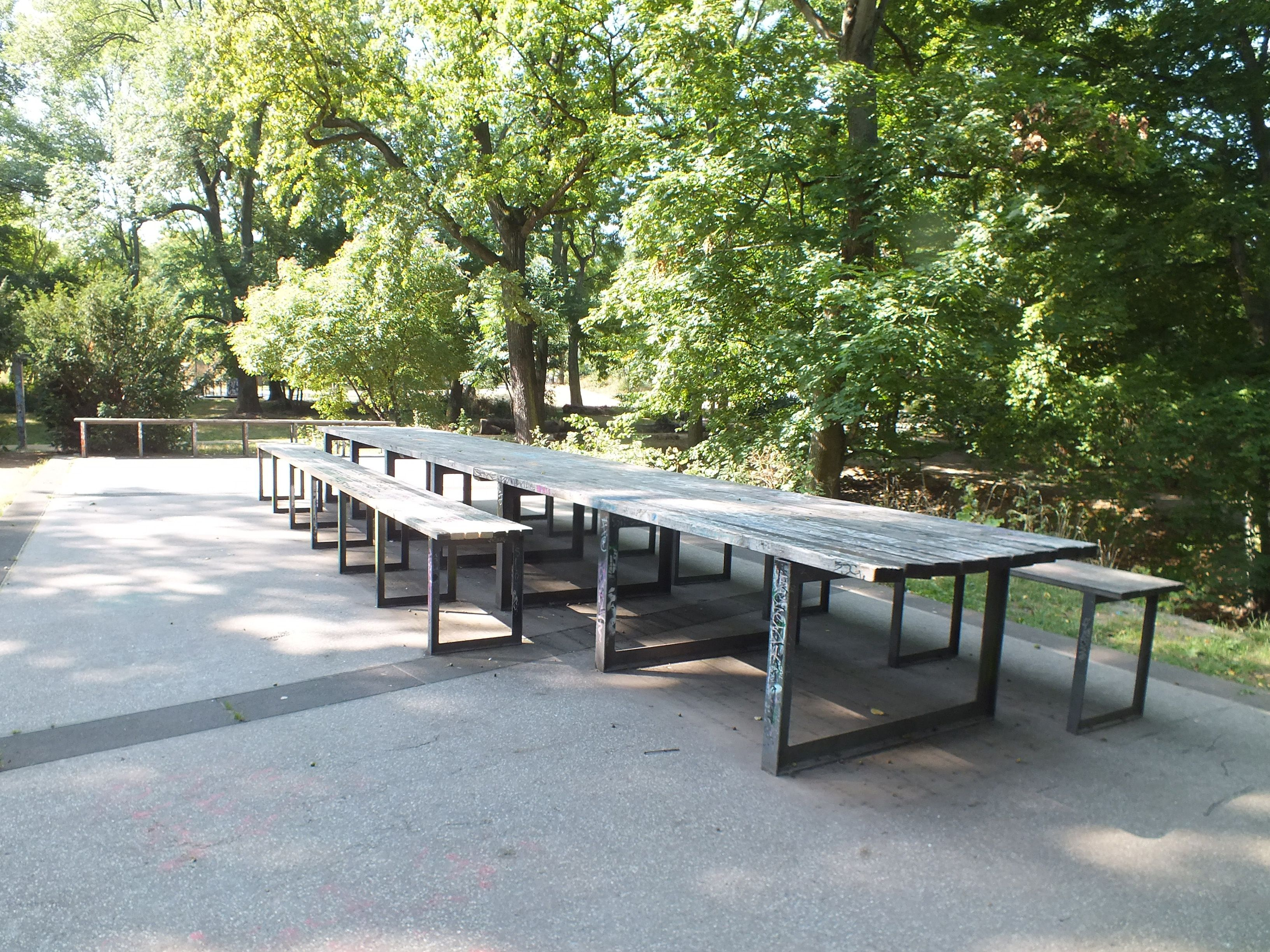
The „knights' table“ in the Park am Wasserschloss (2022)

== Trade ==
The Leutzsch Arkaden shopping center was opened near the town hall in 2004.

== Indoor swimming pool ==
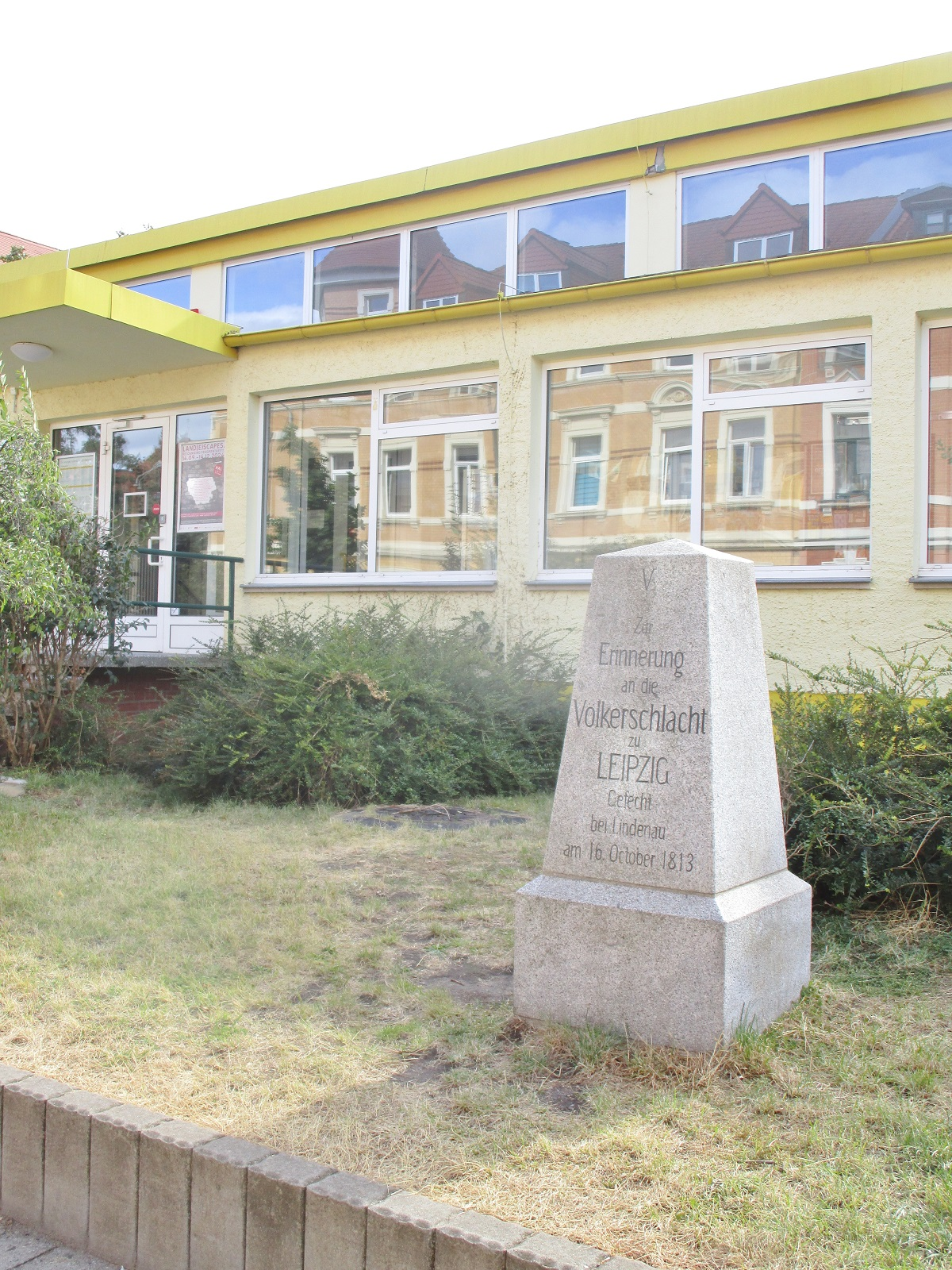
Schwimmhalle West with indoor swimming pool and an Apel-stone to the fore

The Leipziger Sportbäder operates an indoor swimming pool equipped with five 25-meter swimming lanes in Leutzsch.

== Green Space ==
The Park am Wasserschloss (in English: Park at the Water Castle) is the only large public green area in the quarter (with the exception of the extended Leipzig Riverside Forest beyond the quarter). The 2.7 ha (6.7 acres) park is located in the center of Leutzsch and dates back to the estate park of the former manor house.

== See also ==
- BSG Chemie Leipzig (1950)
- BSG Chemie Leipzig (1997)
- Leipzig–Großkorbetha railway
