= Alte Luppe =

River in Germany

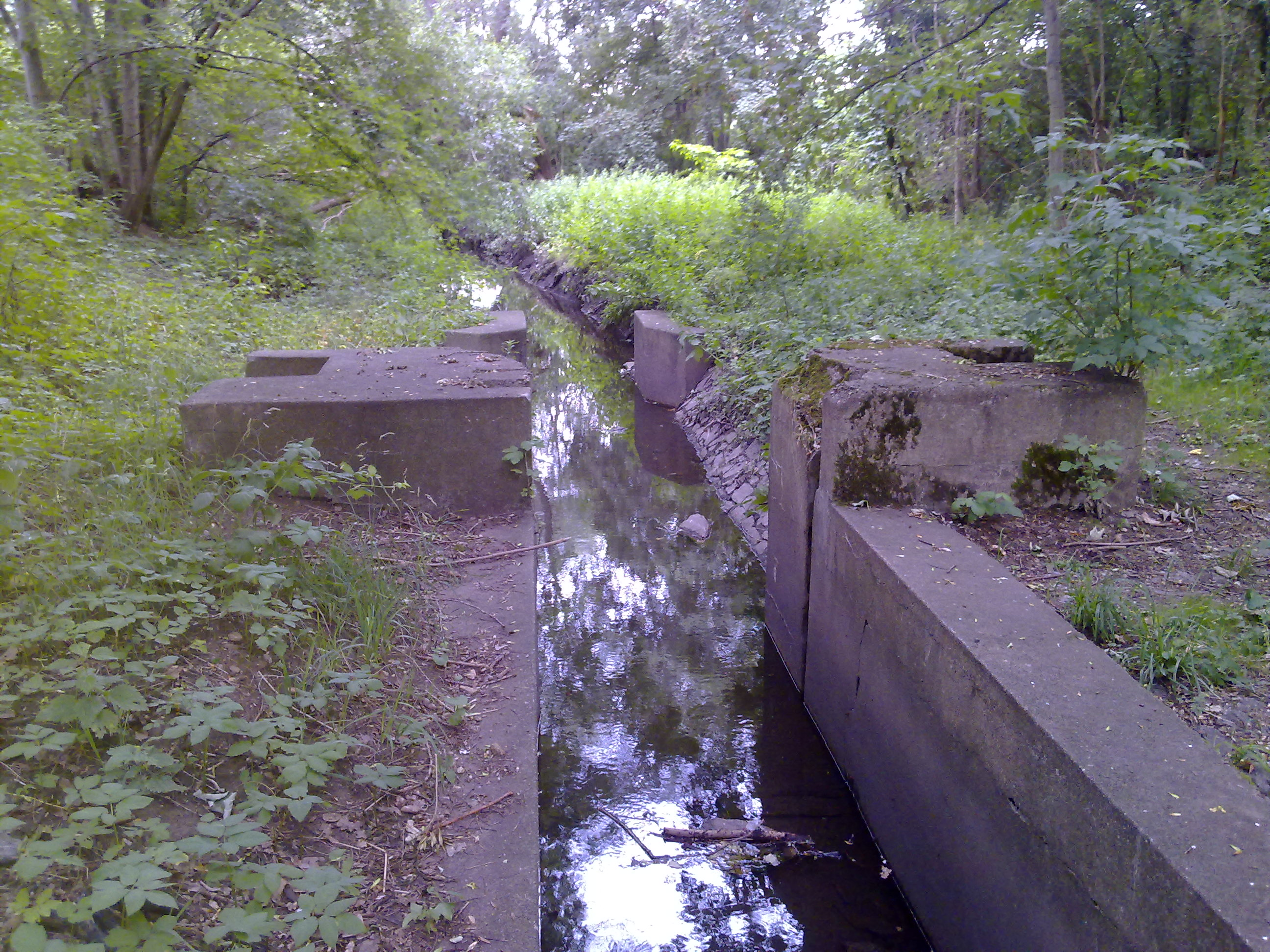

Location
- Country: Germany
- State: Saxony

Physical characteristics
- Source
  - location: Branch of the Bauerngraben
  - coordinates: 51.3611°N 12.3023°E
- Mouth
  - location: Into the Neue Luppe
  - coordinates: 51.3736°N 12.2407°E
- Length: 6 km (3.7 mi)

Basin features
- Progression: Neue Luppe→ White Elster→ Saale→ Elbe→ North Sea

Alte Luppe is a small river of Saxony, Germany.

The Alte Luppe flows in the northwestern suburbs of Leipzig. It begins as a left branch of the Bauerngraben River. It is a left tributary of the Neue Luppe river.

== See also ==
- List of rivers of Saxony
- Bodies of water in Leipzig
- List of rivers of Germany
