= Loupfourdon =

Unidentified location described by Ptolemy (150 A.D.)

Loupfourdon, also Latin: Lupfurdum and Greek: Λούπφουρδον, is a place name mentioned in the atlas Geography, which was compiled by Ptolemy around 150 AD. Up to now, it has not been possible to locate the place or to determine whether the name component furd refers to a ford. Around 150 AD, Ptolemy, as part of his Geography, was probably the first to map some places in Central Europe in a system of coordinates. For this purpose he relied on the information provided by travelers who had crossed the area then known as Magna Germania. Today only medieval copies of the map series still exist. The resulting inaccuracies led to the fact that the location of individual places was controversial in the 19th and 20th centuries.

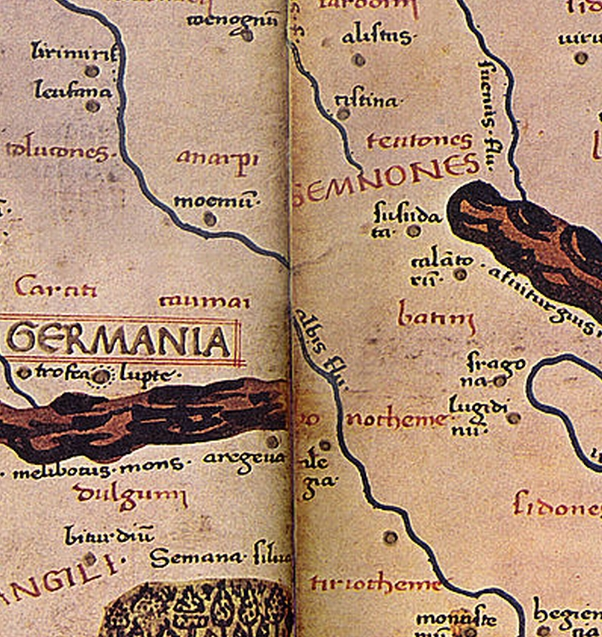
Lupfurdum in the map of Ptolemy

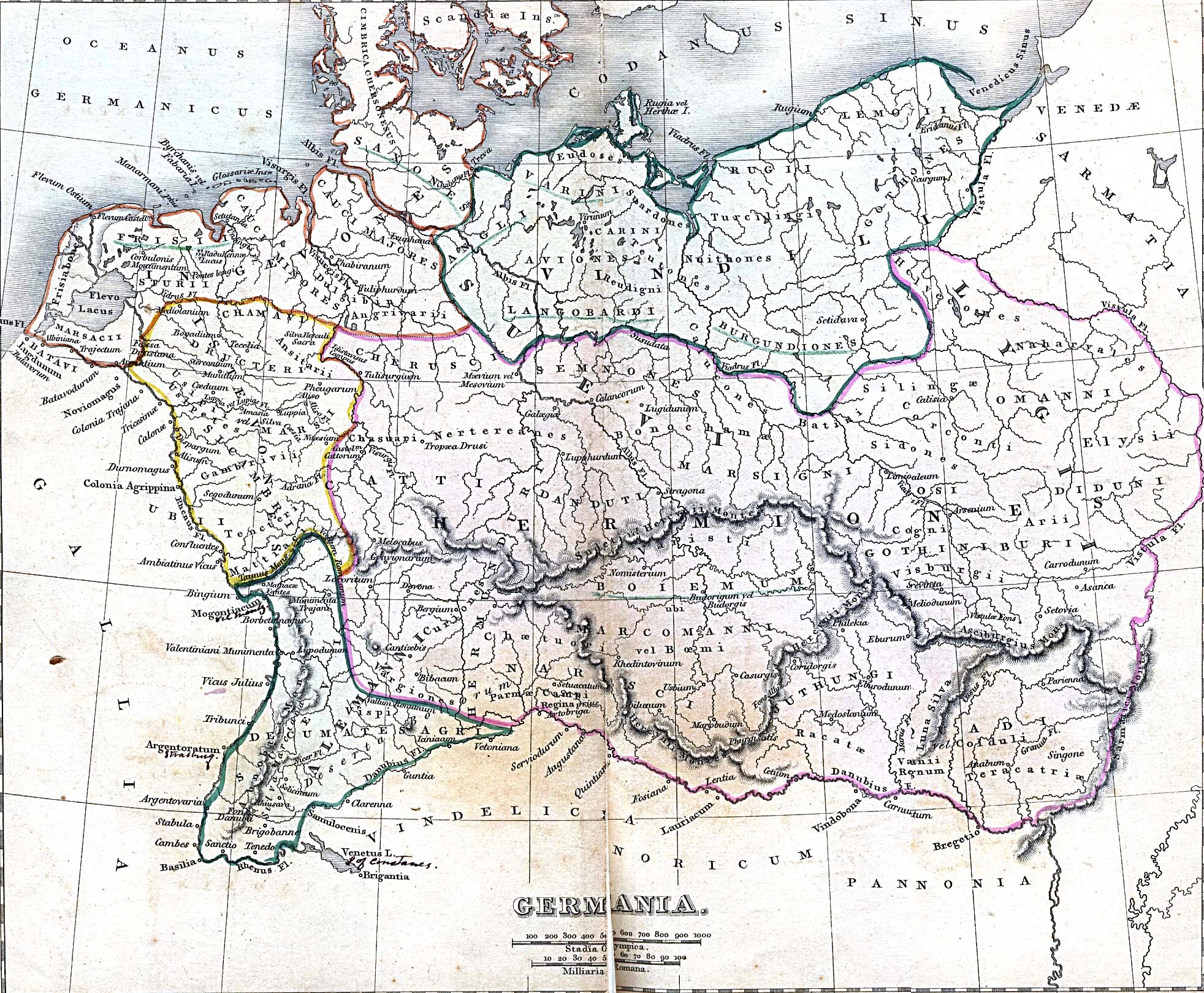
Map of Magna Germania from the 19th century, which connects Stragona with the Dresden area and on which Lupphurdum is assaigned as present-day Leipzig

== Location ==
Although Loupfourdon is located near the left bank of the Elbe in the map, which was preserved in post-antique copies, at the time, it was identified by the antiquity researcher Carl Peter Lepsius as the city of Dornburg. In other interpretations, Lupfurdum was located in Königgrätz (now Hradec Králové in the Czech Republic) or in Meissen, a little downstream from Dresden. Ernst Förstemann deduced, from the name of the village, a location at a ford of the river Luppe and thus moved the village to the Leipzig area.

In the 2000s, the Institute for Geodesy at Technische Universität Berlin carried out a geodetic deformation analysis. A team led by Dieter Lelgemann assigned many historical place names to modern sites with an accuracy of about 20 kilometers and came to the conclusion that Loupfourdon was located approximately at the site of Dresden.

== Bibliography ==
=== Referenced Works ===
- Lepsius, Carl Peter (1854). Small Fonts: Contributions to Thuringian-Saxon History and German Art and Antiquity Studies. Magdeburg: Creutz & Kretschmann. OCLC 844205473.
- Mannert, Konrad (1820). Geography of the Greeks and Romans : Represented from Their Writings. Vol. 3 Germania, Rhaetia, Noricum, Pannonia, According to the Concepts of the Greeks and Romans. Leipzig: Hahn. OCLC 164584788.
- Gschwend, Johann David (1758). Chronicles of Eisenberg's Town and Country: in Them from the Location of the Osterland, Especially the Prince of Saxony. Eisenberg is the Residence and County Town of Eisenberg, of which the High Rulers of Older and More Recent times…the Most Necessary is Also Documented, which Can be Printed on Request. Eisenberg: Walther. OCLC 46246098.
- Förstemann, Ernst (1859). Old German Name Book. Vol. 2. Nordhausen: Ferd. Förstemann. OCLC 777933869.

=== Available Literature ===
- Reichert, Hermann (2000). "Loupfourdon". Real Encyclopedia of Germanic Archaeology. Vol. 16 (2nd ed.). Berlin & New York: Walter de Gruyter. pp. 170–171. ISBN 3110167824. OCLC 15490062.
- Reichert, Hermann (2003). "Ptolemaeus". Real Encyclopedia of Germanic Archaeology. Vol. 23 (2nd ed.). Berlin & New York: Walter de Gruyter. pp. 567–597. ISBN 3110175355. OCLC 15490062.
- Stückelberger, Alfred; Graßhoff, Gerd, eds. (2006). Ptolemy Manual of Geography: Greek-German: Introduction, Text and Translation, and Index. Basel: Schwabe Verlag. ISBN 9783796521485. OCLC 496564792.
- Grünzweig, Friedrich E.; Scheungraber, Corinna (2014). Reichert, Hermann (ed.). The Old Germanic Toponyms as well as the Un-Germanic Toponyms of Germania. A Manual on Their Etymology Using a Bibliography by Robert Nedoma. Vienna: Fassbaender. pp. 117–118. ISBN 9783902575623. OCLC 1135551684.
- Ihm, Maximilian (1893). "Galaegia". Pauly's Real Cyclopedia of Classic Antiquities. Vol. 7. Stuttgart: Druckenmüller Verlag. p. 513. OCLC 471542089.
