= Bauerngraben (Neue Luppe) =

River in Germany

Location
- Country: Germany
- State: Saxony

Physical characteristics
- Mouth
  - location: Neue Luppe
  - coordinates: 51.3708°N 12.2881°E

Basin features
- Progression: Neue Luppe→ White Elster→ Saale→ Elbe→ North Sea

Bauerngraben is a river of Saxony, Germany. It is a left tributary of the Neue Luppe river, which it joins northwest of Leipzig.

== See also ==
- List of rivers of Saxony
