= Nahle =

River in Germany

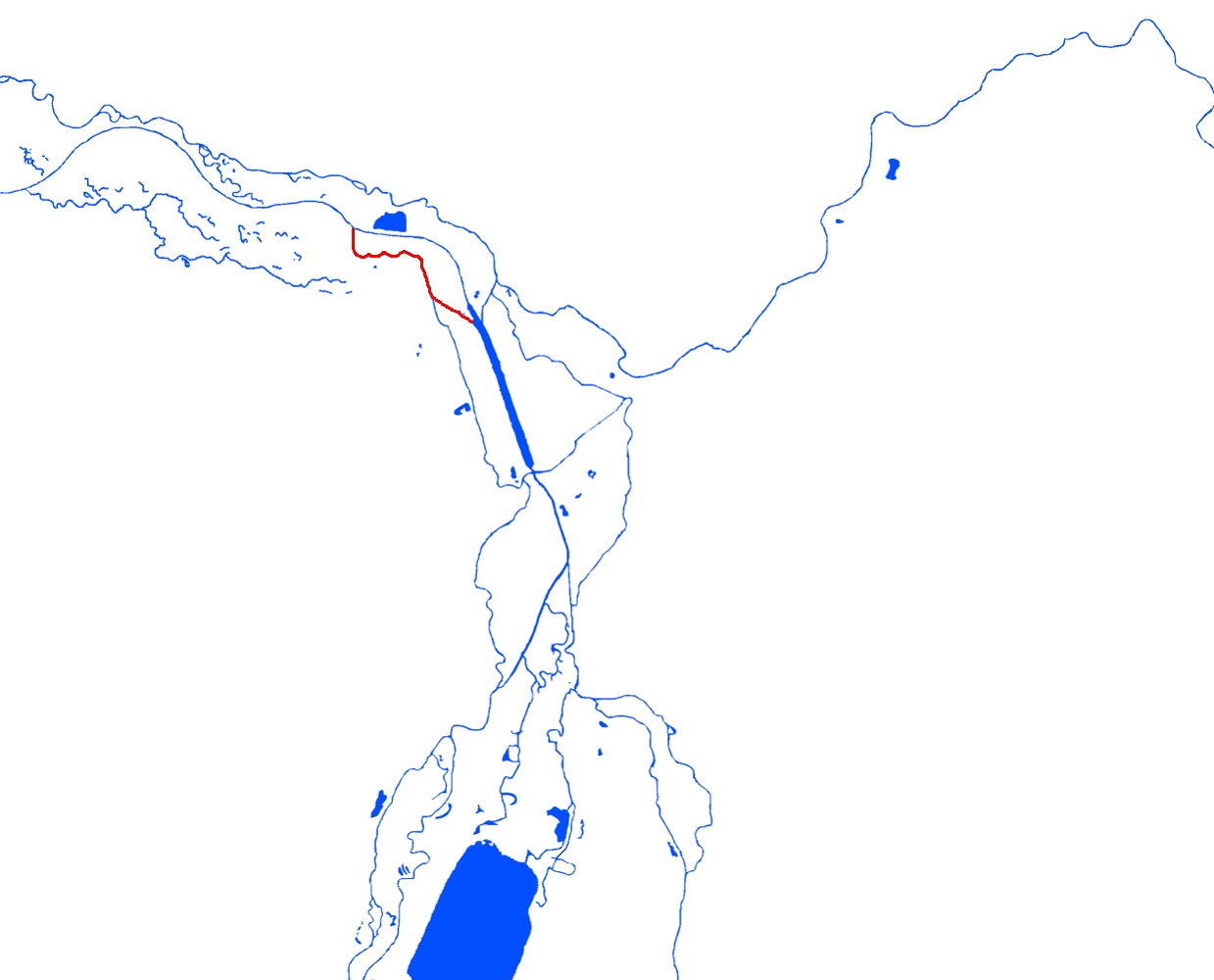
- The Nahle in red

Location
- Country: Germany
- State: Saxony

Physical characteristics
- Mouth
  - coordinates: 51.3681°N 12.3108°E

Basin features
- Progression: Neue Luppe→ White Elster→ Saale→ Elbe→ North Sea

The Nahle is a river of Saxony, Germany. It is a 2.7-kilometre-long (1.7 mi) tributary of the White Elster in Leipzig, Saxony. It is part of the Elster-Luppe system in the northern Leipzig floodplain forest.

== See also ==
- List of rivers of Saxony
- Bodies of water in Leipzig
