= Neue Luppe =

River in Germany

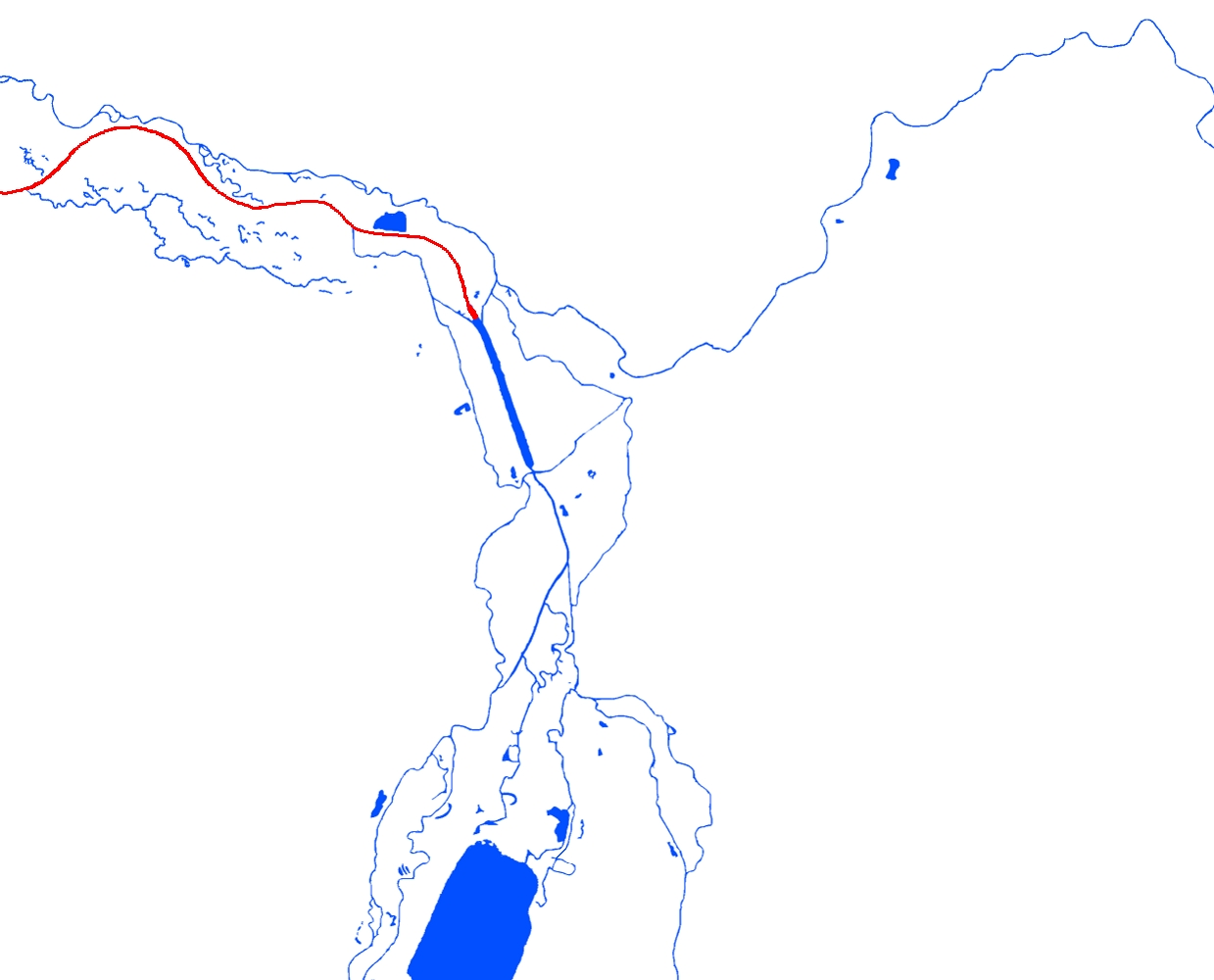
- The neue Luppe in red

Location
- Country: Germany
- States: Saxony and Saxony-Anhalt

Physical characteristics
- Source
  - location: At the Elsterbecken
  - coordinates: 51.3553°N 12.3379°E
- Mouth
  - location: Into the White Elster
  - coordinates: 51.3825°N 12.1781°E

Basin features
- Progression: White Elster→ Saale→ Elbe→ North Sea

Neue Luppe, also called the Luppe Canal, is an artificial tributary of the White Elster in Saxony and is legally classified as a first-order watercourse. Up to its mouth, it is the main arm of the Elster-Luppe river system and carries more water than the White Elster itself.

The Neue Luppe begins at the Elsterbecken. It is a left tributary of the White Elster River, which it joins near Schkeuditz.

== See also ==
- List of rivers of Saxony
- List of rivers of Saxony-Anhalt
- Bodies of water in Leipzig
