= List of castles and palaces in Saxony =

Numerous castles (Burgen) and palaces (Schlösser) are found in the German state of Saxony. These buildings, some of which have a history of over 1000 years, were the setting of historical events, domains of famous personalities and are still imposing buildings to this day.

This list encompasses buildings described in German as Burg (castle), Schloss (palace or stately home), Festung (fort/fortress), Herrenhaus (manor house) and Palais/Palast (palace). After the Middle Ages many of these buildings were remodelled or built as royal or ducal palaces or as stately homes rather than as fortified buildings.

== Bautzen District ==
- Körse Castle, Kirschau
- Neschwitz Baroque Castle, Neschwitz
- Ortenburg, Bautzen
- Rammenau Baroque Castle, Rammenau
- Hermsdorf Castle, Hermsdorf (bei Dresden) (municipality Ottendorf-Okrilla)
- Königsbrück Castle, Königsbrück
- Klippenstein Castle, Radeberg

== Görlitz District ==
- Karlsfried Castle, Lückendorf
- Landeskrone
- Schloss Muskau, Bad Muskau
- Burg- und Klosteranlage Oybin, Oybin

== Leipzig District ==
- Colditz Castle, near Dresden
- Dornreichenbach Castle, Dornreichenbach
- Gnandstein Castle, Gnandstein
- Wiprechtsburg Groitzsch, Groitzsch
- Kohren-Sahlis Castle, Kohren-Sahlis
- Mutzschen Castle, Mutzschen
- Frohburg Castle, Frohburg
- Altranstädt Castle, Altranstädt

== Meissen District ==
- Albrechtsburg, Meißen
- Batzdorf Castle, Klipphausen
- Fasanenschlösschen, Moritzburg
- Gana Castle, Stauchitz
- Heynitz Castle, Nossen
- Hirschstein Castle, Hirschstein
- Hoflößnitz Castle, Radebeul
- Moritzburg Castle, Moritzburg
- Nossen Castle, Nossen
- Oberau Castle, Oberau (Saxony)
- Proschwitz Castle, Meißen
- Scharfenberg Castle, Klipphausen
- Schleinitz Castle, Leuben-Schleinitz
- Schönfeld Castle, Schönfeld (Saxony)
- Seußlitz Baroque Castle, Diesbar-Seußlitz
- Siebeneichen Castle, Meißen
- Lustschlösschen Spitzhaus, Radebeul
- Wackerbarths Ruh Castle, Radebeul
- Weistropp Castle, Weistropp

== Middle Saxony District ==
Castles in Middle Saxony District (selection)
- Kempe Castle, Roßwein
- Mildenstein Castle, Leisnig
- Wunderburg, Roßwein
- Augustusburg Hunting Lodge, Augustusburg
- Bieberstein Castle, Bieberstein
- Frauenstein Castle, Frauenstein
- Freudenstein Castle, Freiberg
- Gleichenstein Castle, Braunsdorf
- Lichtenwalde Castle, Niederwiesa
- Purschenstein Castle, Neuhausen/Erzgeb.
- Weißenborn Castle, Weißenborn/Erzgeb.
- Reinsberg Castle, Reinsberg (Saxony)
- Kriebstein Castle, Kriebstein
- Rochlitz Castle, Rochlitz
- Rochsburg, Rochsburg
- Wechselburg Castle, Wechselburg
- Ehrenberg Castle, Kriebstein
- Sachsenburg Castle, Frankenberg/Sa.

== Northern Saxony District ==
- Delitzsch Castle, Delitzsch
- Eilenburg Castle, Eilenburg
- Hartenfels Castle, Torgau
- Hubertusburg Castle, Wermsdorf)
- Dahlen Castle, Dahlen
- Börln Castle, Börln
- Großböhla Castle, Großböhla

== Ore Mountains District ==
- Hoheneck Castle, Stollberg
- Liebenstein Castle, Pobershau
- Scharfenstein Castle, Scharfenstein (municipality Drebach)
- Schlettau Castle, Schlettau
- Schwarzenberg Castle, Schwarzenberg
- Wildeck Castle, Zschopau
- Wolkenstein Castle, Wolkenstein

== Saxon Switzerland-Eastern Ore Mountains District ==
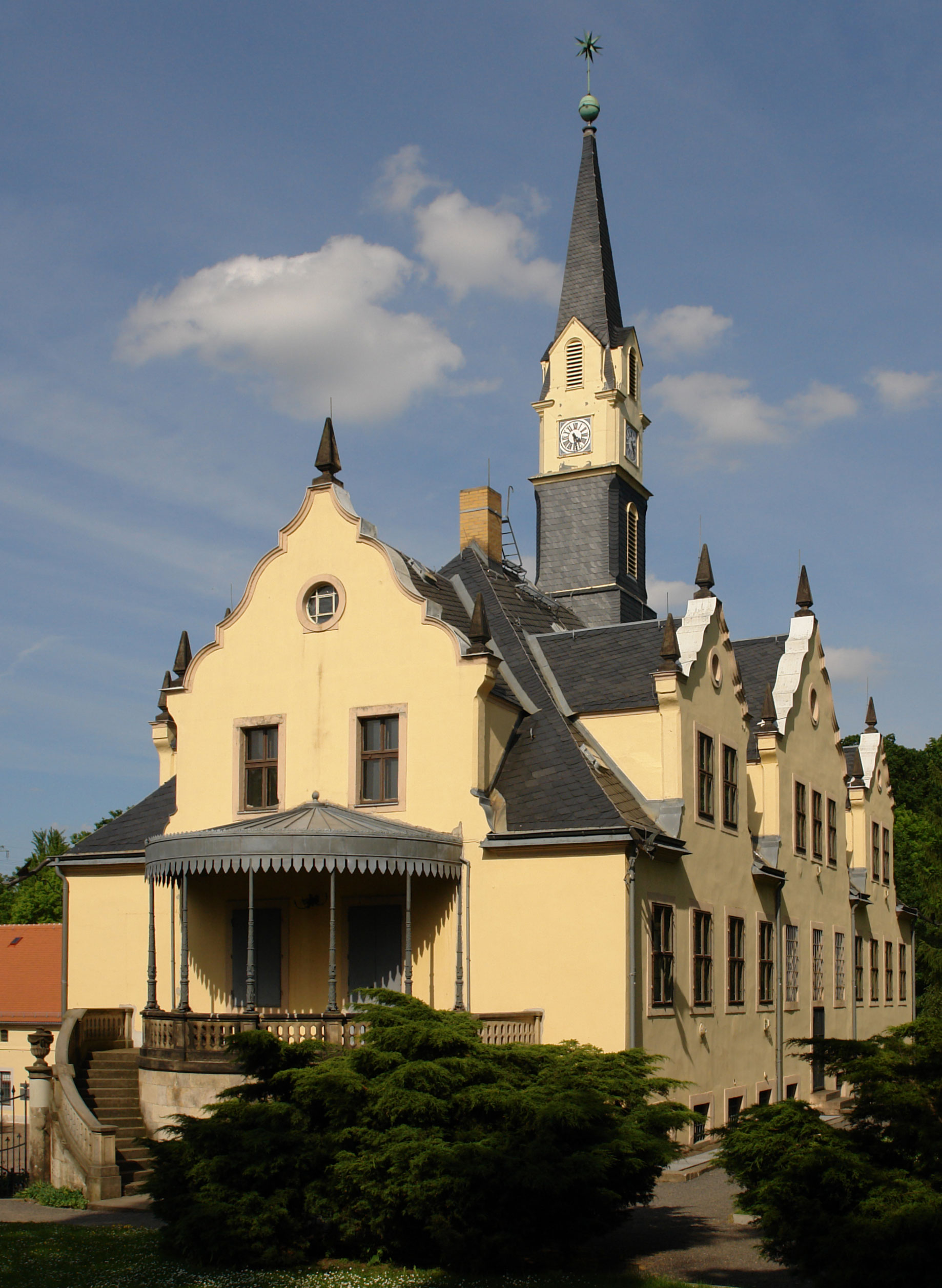
Schloss Burgk in Freital

- Alter Wildenstein
- Altrathen Castle, Rathen
- Arnstein Castle
- Bärenstein Castle
- Burgk Castle, Freital
- Dohna Castle, Dohna
- Friedrichschlößchen and Baroque Garden, Großsedlitz, Großsedlitz
- Grillenburg Hunting Lodge, Tharandt
- Grimmstein, Schlottwitz
- Hohnstein Castle, Hohnstein
- Jochhöhschlösschen, Pesterwitz
- Königstein Fortress, Königstein
- Kuckuckstein Castle, Liebstadt
- Lauenstein Castle
- Neuer Wildenstein
- Neurathen Castle, Rathen
- Nöthnitz Castle, Bannewitz
- Hunting Lodge Rehefeld, Rehefeld-Zaunhaus
- Reinhardtsgrimma Castle, Reinhardtsgrimma
- Sonnenstein Castle, Pirna
- Stolpen Castle, Stolpen
- Tharandt Castle, Tharandt
- Schloss Weesenstein, Weesenstein
- Winterstein, also Hinteres Raubschloß, Ottendorf
- Zuschendorf Castle, Pirna

== Vogtland District ==
- Hradschin Castle
- Jößnitz Castle
- Elsterberg Castle, Elsterberg
- Renaissance Castle of Göltzsch, Rodewisch
- Leubnitz Castle, Leubnitz (Vogtland)
- Mylau Castle, Mylau
- Netzschkau Castle, Netzschkau
- Schönberg Castle, Bad Brambach
- Unteres Schloss, Ellefeld
- Voigtsberg Castle, Oelsnitz (Vogtland)
- Treuen Castle, Treuen

== Zwickau District ==
- Osterstein Castle
- Planitz Castle
- Blankenhain Castle, Crimmitschau
- Forderglauchau Castle, Glauchau
- Hinterglauchau Castle, Glauchau
- Hartenstein Castle, Hartenstein
- Stein Castle, Hartenstein
- Schloss Wolfsbrunn, Hartenstein (a former villa, not a castle or palace)
- Isenburg, Bad Schlema
- Lauterbach Castle, Neukirchen/Pleiße
- Leubnitz Castle, Werdau
- Lichtenstein Castle Lichtenstein
- Schönfels Castle, Lichtentanne
- Schweinsburg, Neukirchen/Pleiße
- Steinpleiss Castle, Werdau
- Wiesenburg Castle, Wildenfels
- Wildenfels Castle, Wildenfels
- Wolkenburg Castle, Limbach-Oberfrohna

== City of Dresden (urban district, state capital) ==
- Albrechtsberg Castle
- Eckberg Castle
- Lingnerschloss (alias "Villa Stockhausen")
- Nickern Castle
- Pillnitz Castle
- Royal Residence
- Zwinger Palace

== City of Leipzig (urban district) ==
- Gohlis Palace (Gohliser Schlösschen)
- Pleißenburg

== City of Chemnitz (urban district) ==
- Chemnitz Castle
- Rabenstein Castle
- Klaffenbach Water Castle

== See also ==
- List of castles
- List of castles in Germany
