= State Palaces, Castles and Gardens of Saxony =

Saxon cultural preservation organization

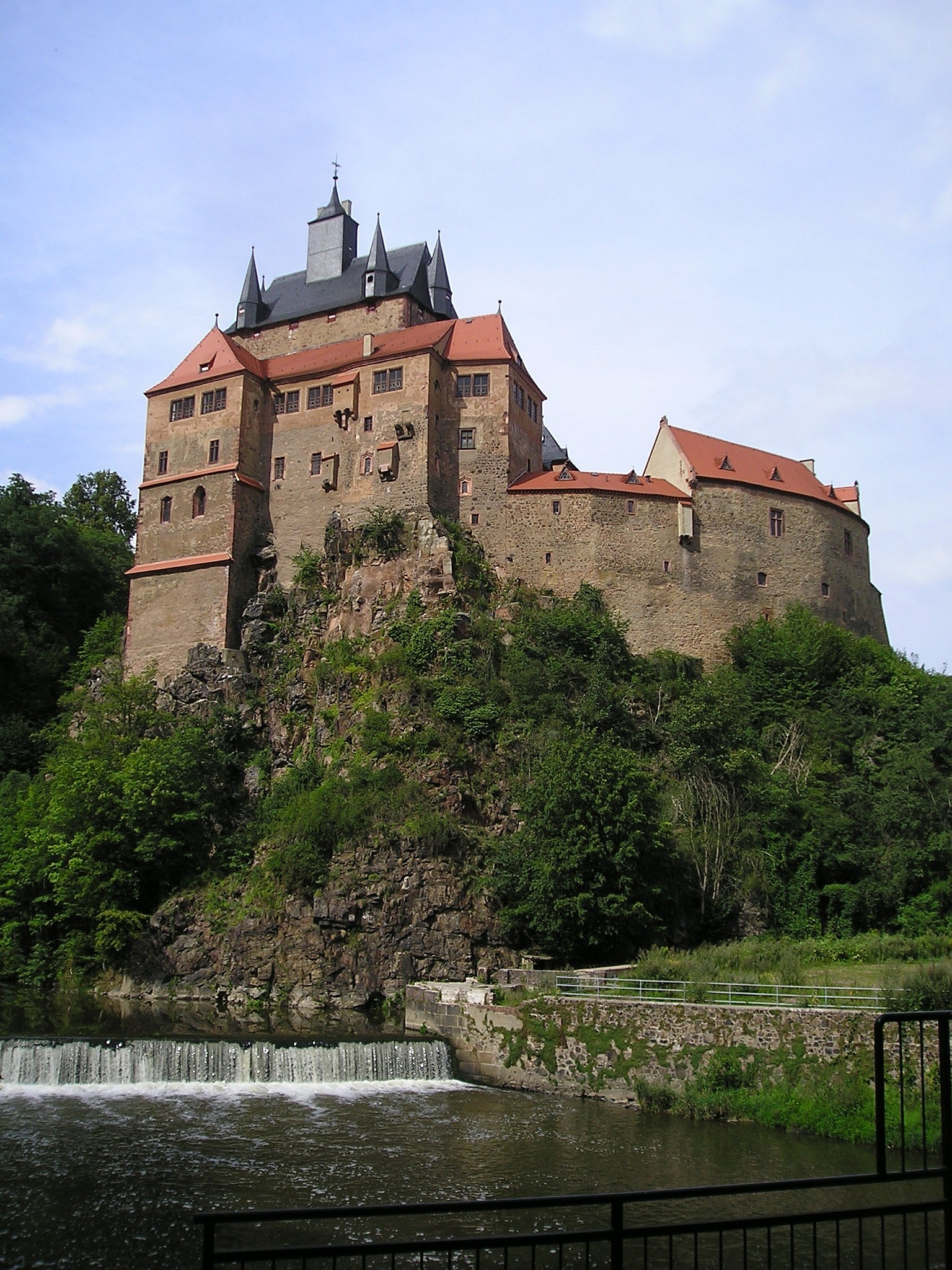
Kriebstein Castle, one of the castles managed by the State Palaces, Castles and Gardens of Saxony

The State Palaces, Castles and Gardens of Saxony (German: Staatliche Schlösser, Burgen und Gärten Sachsen) is a state-owned company with its head office in Dresden. It belongs to the Saxon State Ministry of Finance and has the aim of preserving Saxon cultural heritage whilst respecting cultural and conservation needs. The state-owned company manages several palaces, castles and parks in the Saxony. These include the Zwinger in Dresden, the Albrechtsburg in Meissen and Kriebstein Castle.

== History ==
Following the restoration of the Free State of Saxony on 3 October 1990, assets that had already been owned in the past by the state, or which had been managed during the East German era as legal entities under the Asset Allocation Act, were transferred into the ownership of the new German state.

Starting on the first of January 1992, the state took over the following properties: Dresden Castle including the Johanneum and the Stallhof, the Dresden Zwinger and the Zwinger Gardens, the Japanese Palace with its palace garden, Pillnitz Castle and park, Moritzburg Palace and the surrounding landscape gardens, the Albrechtsburg in Meißen, Königstein Fortress, Schloss Weesenstein, Gnandstein Castle, Frauenstein castle ruins, Großsedlitz Baroque Gardens, Hubertusburg Palace, Nischwitz Palace, Stolpen Castle, Augustusburg Palace, Lichtenwalde Palace, the palace and park at Bad Muskau, Colditz Castle, Altzella Abbey, Nossen Palace, Wiederau Palace, Mildenstein Castle and the Ortenburg

In the following years, other historic buildings were allocated to the Free State of Saxony.

With a cabinet decision on third November 1992, 17 independent state companies were formed for some of the most important sites and placed under commercial management. These companies together formed the State Palaces Department (Staatliche Schlösserverwaltung). During the implementation phase, between 1 April 1993 and 1 January 1994, 15 state-owned enterprises were founded for the following properties:

- 1 April 1993: the Albrechtsburg at Meißen, Augustusburg Palace, Scharfenstein Castle, Königstein Fortress, Moritzburg Palace
- 1 June 1993: Großsedlitz Baroque Gardens, Gnandstein Castle, Kriebstein Castle, Mildenstein Castle, Rammenau Palace, Stolpen Castle, Weesenstein Palace
- 1 August 1993: Dresden State Palaces and Gardens (Staatliche Schlösser und Gärten Dresden) (Pillnitz Palace and park, the Großer Garten, the Brühlsche Terrasse/Zwinger/Stallhof), Nossen Palace/Altzella Abbey Park
- 1 January 1994: Rochlitz Palace

In addition, the Palaces Department managed the following properties directly: the Albertinum, the Catholic Court Church, the Jägerhof, the Royal Burial Chapel at Freiberg, Colditz Castle, Lichtenwalde Palace and the Exhibition Hall of the Academy of Art.

The following properties remained under the administration of local authority land offices: the Japanese Palace, Siebeneichen Palace, Reinhardtsgrimma Palace, the Ortenburg, Hubertusburg Palace, Freudenstein Castle, Wurzen Palace, Grimma Palace Königswartha Palace, Suchominsky Villa, Sonnenstein Castle, Dippoldiswalde Palace, the Niederlauterstein castle ruins, the Frauenstein castle ruins, Wachwitz Palace, the Royal Villa, Lützschena Palace, Thallwitz Palace, the Grillenburg Hunting Lodge, Brauna Palace, the Keppschloss, Zehren-Schieritz Palace, Königsbrück Palace, Gaussig House, Hohenprießnitz Palace and Ruhenthal Palace. Many of these sites were later transferred to the towns and cities in which they were situated or sold off to third parties.

On 1 March 1996 the Saxon Palaces Department was incorporated into the State Finance Office. On 1 July 2000 the companies running Königstein Fortress on the one hand and the castles of Augustusburg, Lichtenwalde, and Scharfenstein on the other hand were turned in a charitable company. Their owner remains the Free State of Saxony. The management of those involved is carried out by the Palaces Department.

In the period from 1993 to 2003 the Palaces Department's share of the cost rose from 37% to 61.4%. As of 1 January 2003, the Palaces Department was separate from the State Office and a common public enterprise, the "State Palaces, Castles and Gardens of Saxony", was founded. The palace companies are its individual business units.

== State Palaces, Castles and Gardens of Saxony ==
Property	German name	Operator	Image
Albrechtsburg at Meissen	Albrechtsburg Meissen		
Rammenau Baroque Palace	Barockschloss Rammenau		
Zwinger	Dresdner Zwinger	Schlossbetrieb Staatliche Schlösser und Gärten Dresden	
Dresden Stallhof	Dresdner Stallhof	Schlossbetrieb Staatliche Schlösser und Gärten Dresden	
Little Pheasant Castle and landscape park at Moritzburg	Fasanenschlösschen und Landschaftspark Moritzburg	Schlossbetrieb Moritzburg	
Dresden Fortress and Brühl's Terrace	Festung Dresden und Brühlsche Terrasse	Schlossbetrieb Staatliche Schlösser und Gärten Dresden	
Moritzburg Palace	Schloss Moritzburg	Schlossbetrieb Moritzburg	
Nossen Palace	Schloss Nossen	Schlossbetrieb Schloss Nossen/Kloster Altzella	
Pillnitz Castle & park	Schloss & Park Pillnitz	Schlossbetrieb Staatliche Schlösser und Gärten Dresden	
Rochlitz Castle	Schloss Rochlitz	Schlossbetrieb Schlösser und Burgen im Muldental	
Schloss Weesenstein	Schloss Weesenstein		
Gnandstein Castle	Burg Gnandstein		
Kriebstein Castle	Burg Kriebstein		
Mildenstein Castle	Burg Mildenstein	Schlossbetrieb Schlösser und Burgen im Muldental	
Stolpen Castle	Burg Stolpen		
Großsedlitz Baroque Gardens	Barockgarten Großsedlitz		
Großer Garten & Dresden Park Railway	Großer Garten & Dresdner Parkeisenbahn	Schlossbetrieb Staatliche Schlösser und Gärten Dresden	
Altzella Abbey	Kloster Altzella	Schlossbetrieb Schloss Nossen/Kloster Altzella	
Augustusburg Hunting Lodge	Jagdschloss Augustusburg	Schloss Augustusburg/Schloss und Park Lichtenwalde/Burg Scharfenstein gGmbH	
Lichtenwalde Palace und Park	Schloss und Park Lichtenwalde	Schloss Augustusburg/Schloss und Park Lichtenwalde/Burg Scharfenstein gGmbH	
Scharfenstein Castle	Burg Scharfenstein	Schloss Augustusburg/Lichtenwalde Schloss und Park/Burg Scharfenstein gGmbH	
Königstein Fortress	Festung Königstein	Festung Königstein gGmbH	

== Schlösserland Sachsen ==
In 2005, the advertising association Schlösserland Sachsen (Castles of Saxony) was created, a federation of major governmental and non-governmental heritage building and gardens groups, which has the task of preserving, maintaining and displaying Saxony's cultural monuments. Under this umbrella brand, in cooperation with the Saxony Tourism Marketing Corporation (TMGS), more than 50 castles, palaces, gardens, fortresses and castle hotels are marketed both nationwide and internationally.

The following palaces, castles and abbeys are partners in the Werbegemeinschaft Schlösserland Sachsen:

Site	German name	Owner/Operator	Image
Delitzsch Palace	Barockschloss Delitzsch	Town of Delitzsch	
Dresden Castle	Residenzschloss Dresden	Staatliche Kunstsammlungen Dresden	
Freudenstein Castle	Schloss Freudenstein	Town of Freiberg	
Colditz Castle	Schloss Colditz	Operated by the Gesellschaft Schloss Colditz e.V., Owned by the Schlösser und Burgen im Muldental	
Hartenfels Palace	Schloss Hartenfels	Town of Torgau	
Klippenstein Palace	Schloss Klippenstein	Town of Radeberg	
Krobnitz Palace	Schloss Krobnitz	Town of Reichenbach	
Palace Lauenstein	Schloss Lauenstein	Town of Altenberg	
Neschwitz Palace and park	Schloss und Park Neschwitz	Municipality of Neschwitz	
Schlettau Palace	Schloss Schlettau	Town of Schlettau	
Voigtsberg Palace	Schloss Voigtsberg	Town of Oelsnitz/Vogtl.	
Wackerbarth Palace	Schloss Wackerbarth	Sächsisches Staatsweingut GmbH (Saxon state winery)	
Wildeck Palace	Schloss Wildeck	Town of Zschopau	
Klaffenbach Castle	Wasserschloss Klaffenbach	City of Chemnitz	
Ortenburg, Bautzen	Ortenburg Bautzen	Town of Bautzen	
Muskau Park	Fürst-Pückler-Park Bad Muskau	Stiftung Fürst-Pückler-Park Bad Muskau	
Buch Abbey	Kloster Buch	Förderverein Kloster Buch e. V.	
Nimbschen Abbey	Kloster Nimbschen		

In addition there are the properties owned by the hotel and hospitality industry: Hohnstein Castle, Churfuerstliche Waldschänke Moritzburg, Europa-Jugendherberge Schloss Colditz, Pension Zur Königlichen Ausspanne, Schloss Hotel Dresden-Pillnitz and Schlosshotel Gaußig.

== Visitor numbers ==
The state-owned palaces, castles and gardens receive about two million visitors every year.

== Management and staff ==
The head office of the state company has five divisions under the management of Christian Striefler. The individual palace business units are run by a palace manager (Schlossleiter).

The supervisory body for the state firm is the governing board (Verwaltungsrat). Its main task is the oversight of the business leadership and support to the manager.
