= Maxen (disambiguation) =

Magnus Maximus (c.335-388) was a usurper of the Western Roman Empire.

Maxen may also mean:

- Battle of Maxen (1759), a battle fought at the village of Maxen (modern day Müglitztal, Germany)
- Maxen Kapo (born 2001), French footballer
- Maxen Hook (born 2001), American football player
- Maxen, a village in Müglitztal, Germany.
