= Frauenstein Castle =

Frauenstein Castle may refer to:

- Frauenstein Castle (Ore Mountains)
- Frauenstein Castle (Wiesbaden)
