= Mildenstein Castle =

Mildenstein Castle
- Burg Mildenstein, Schloss Leisnig
- Leisnig in Germany
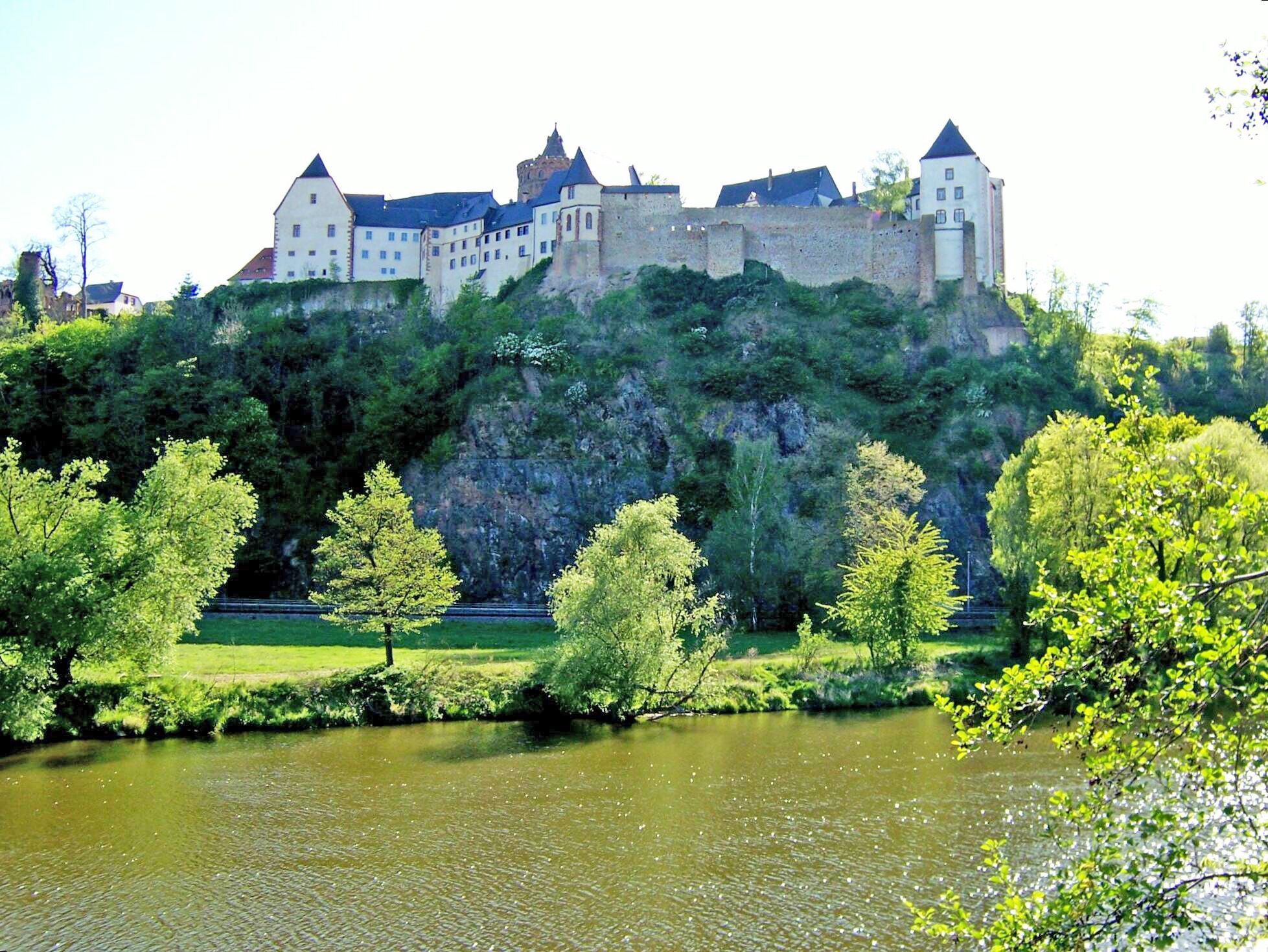
- Mildenstein Castle above Freiberger Mulde

Site information
- Type: castle
- Owner: Free State of Saxony
- Operator: State Palaces, Castles and Gardens of Saxony
- Open to the public: yes
- Website: http://www.burg-mildenstein.de

Location
- Location of Mildenstein in Saxony
- Coordinates: 51°9′44″N 12°55′32″E

Site history
- Built: 10th century
- In use: 14th century
- Museum, concert and event venue

Mildenstein Castle, in German Burg Mildenstein, also called Schloss Leisnig, is located in Leisnig in Landkreis Mittelsachsen, Saxony, Germany. It is a property of the Free State of Saxony and is administrated by the company State Palaces, Castles and Gardens of Saxony.

== Geography ==
The castle is located on a spur above the river Freiberger Mulde, at the northern edge of the town of Leisnig proper and opposite the village of Fischendorf. The rock is a former lava dome and consists of pre-mesozoic rhyolite, in particular the so-called Leisniger Quarzporphyr.

== History ==
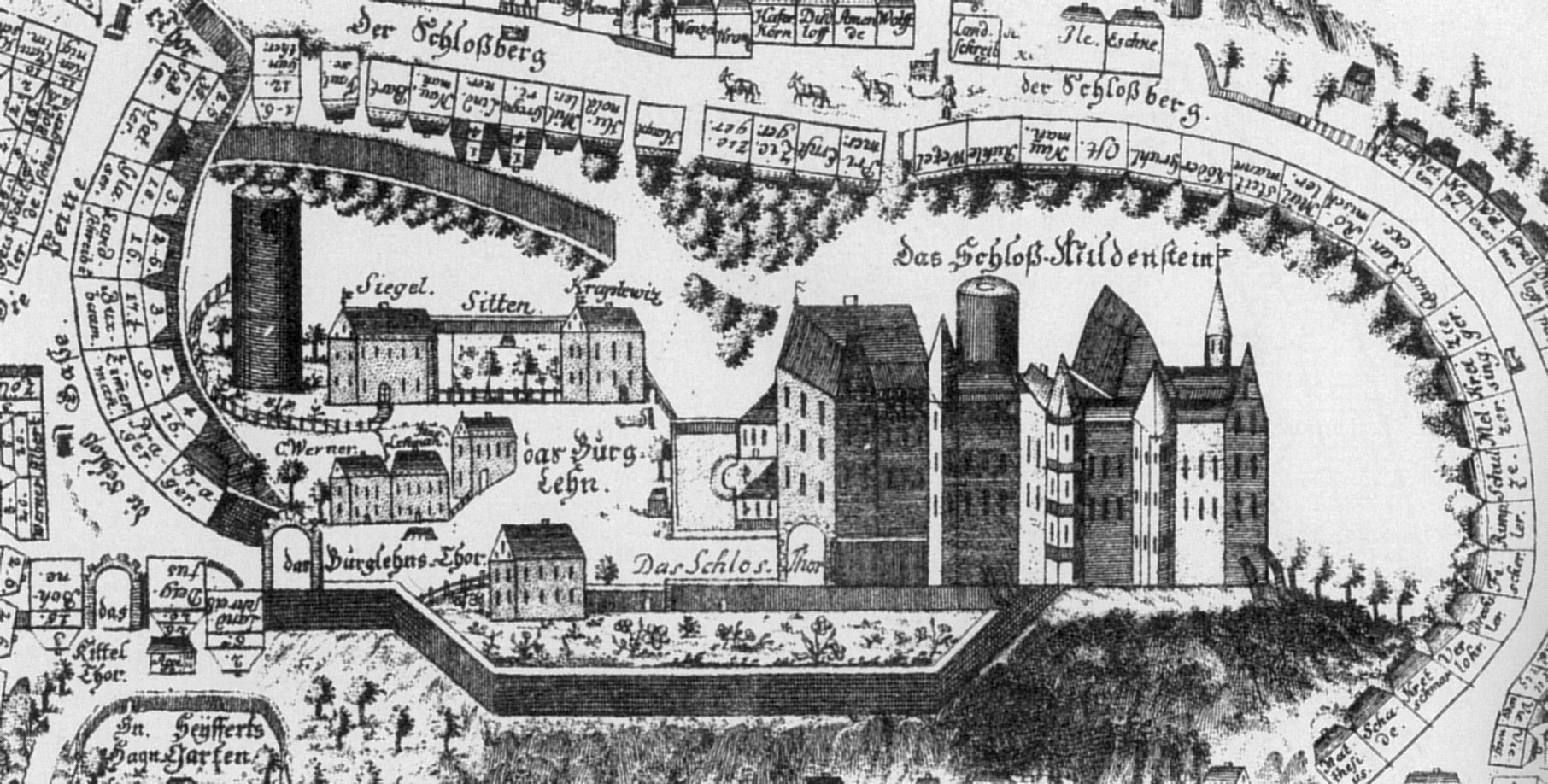
Illustration by Johann Kamprad (1753)

There is archeological evidence for an ancient settlement on the rock spur above Freiberger Mulde.

Mildenstein castle was probably built in the 10th century. However, it was first mentioned only in 1046 when Emperor Heinrich III gifted the Burgwards of Colditz, Rochlitz, and Leisnig to Agnes of Poitou. In 1084 the castle was enfeoffed by Emperor Heinrich IV to Wiprecht of Groitzsch. In 1143 it went by marriage to Franconian earl Rapoto von Abenberg, Stiftsvogt of Bamberg, who sold it in 1148 to Duke Friedrich III of Schwaben who later became known as Emperor Barbarossa. The latter made the castle in 1158 an imperial property, tied to the office of the Emperor and enfeoffed to the Burgraves of Leisnig. As such, it became a governing centre of the Imperial Territory of Pleißenland.

In the early 13th century the castle was the seat of the imperial ministeriales family von Mildenstein who had to give up their properties in the area after they lost a dispute over the entitlement to tithes from former church properties, and Margrave Henry the Illustrious captured the castle in 1232.

The Burgraves of Leisnig founded Buch Abbey in 1192 and acquired the lordship of Mutzschen before 1308. They became one of the most powerful families in the area. Burgrave Otto I of Leisnig, together with his father-in-law, Burgrave Albrecht IV of Altenburg, also gained the lordships of Lauterstein (1323) and Waldheim (1324), and inherited the lordship of Rochsburg from the latter in 1329. However, the joined Ämter Leisnig and Altenburg fell to Margrave Frederick the Serious after Albrecht IV died in 1329. The Leisnigs lost their imperial immediacy, were forced to sell their burgraviate in 1365, kept only their possessions around Rochsburg and Penig and died out in 1538.

Mildenstein castle was rebuilt in the late 14th century under Margrave Wilhelm I. It was, however, not used as a residence, but remained the seat of the local government (Amt Leisnig). Castle and town suffered heavy damage during the Thirty Years' War. In 1706/1707 it was chosen as a residence by Stanisław Leszczyński, who had been elected anti-king to Augustus the Strong. Later in the 18th century the castle housed the regional court of law, a prison and apartments for officials.

Beginning in 1798, the local Mirus family had a romantic park constructed around the castle, which is notable for its artificial ruins and a rock tunnel built in 1866. Since 1890 Mildenstein castle has been used as a museum. A small zoo was also established in the park, but closed in 1990.

== Buildings ==
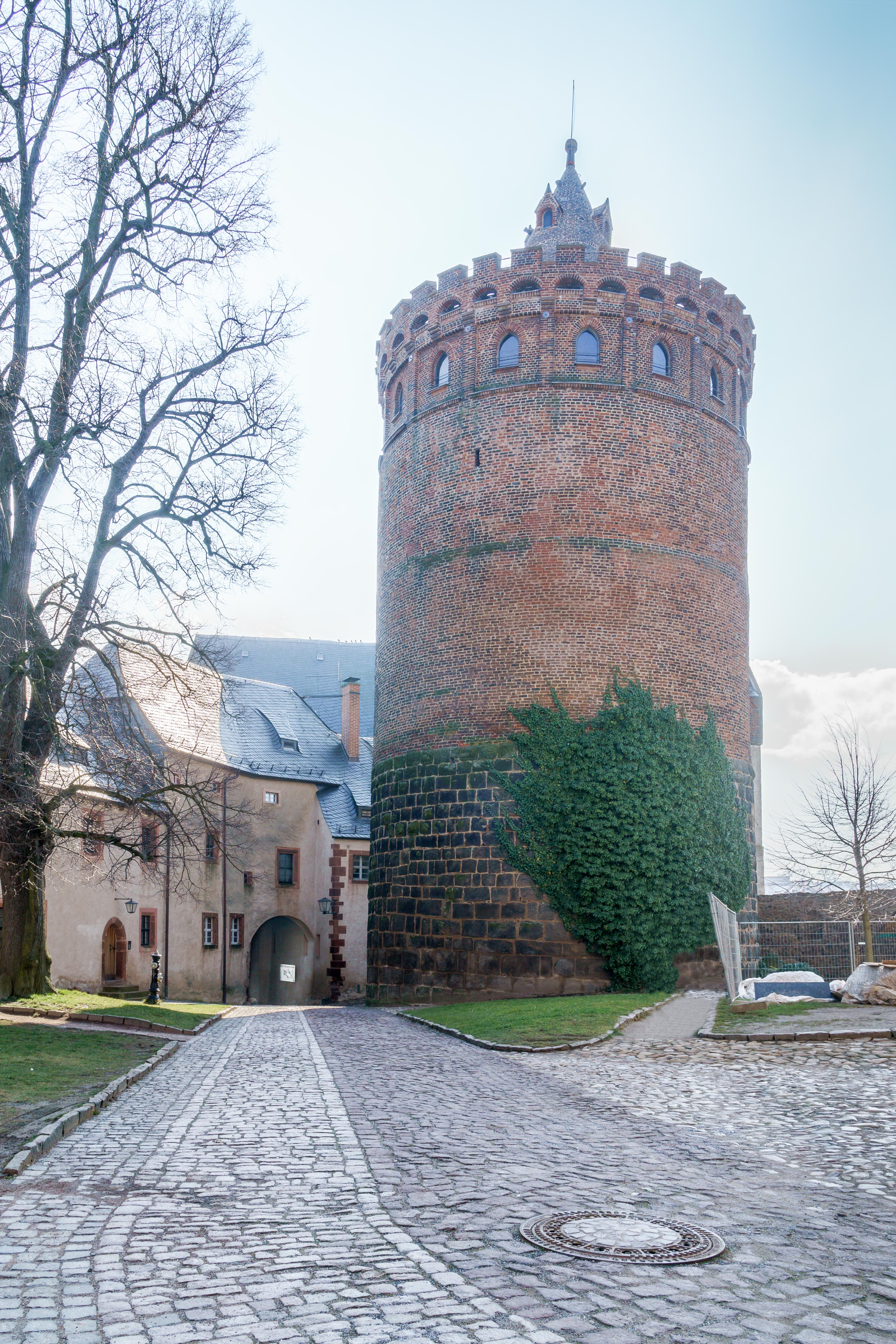
Bergfried in the inner courtyard

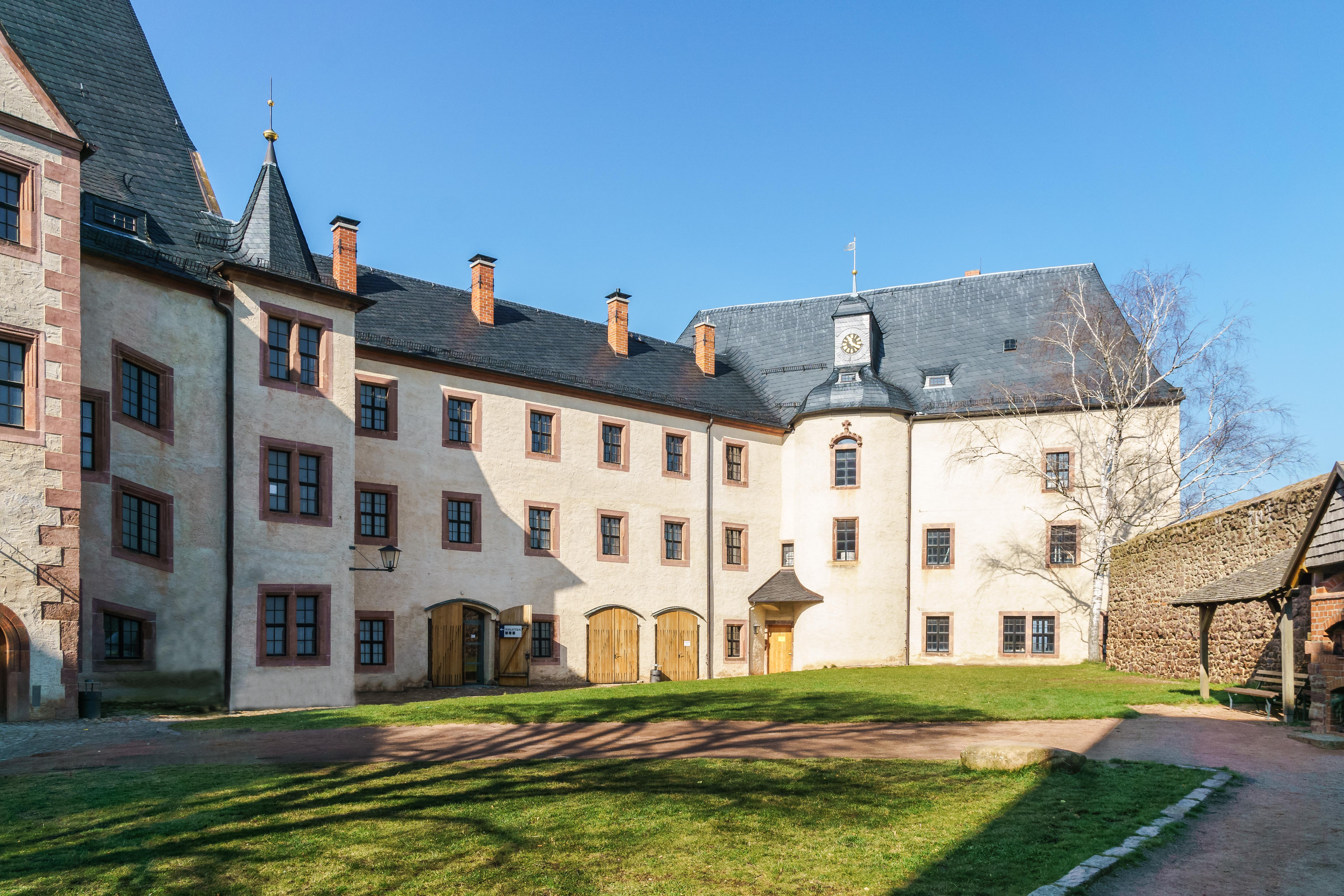
Pagenhaus (squires' quarters)

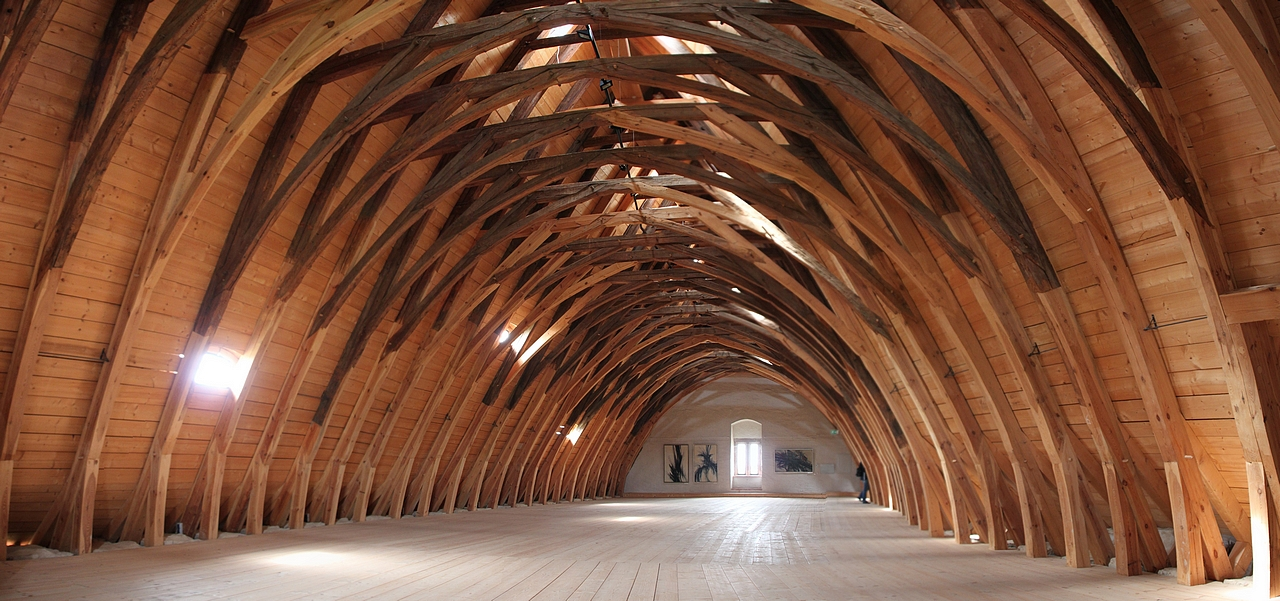
Roof construction of the granary

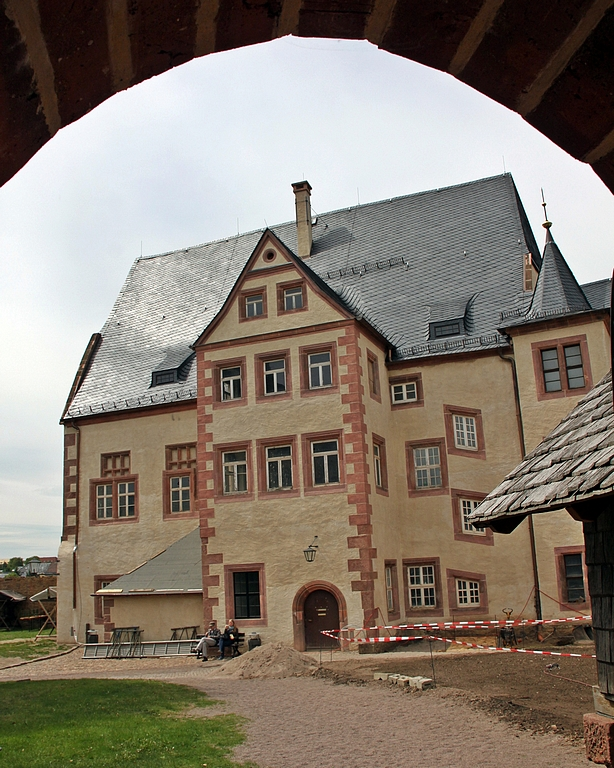
Herrenhaus (Lord's residence)

The chapel dates from the 12th century and was rebuilt around 1400. The Bergfried in the inner courtyard dates from the late 12th century. It is 32 m (105 ft) high and has a diameter of 14 m (46 ft). Its lower part is built from locally found quartzite blocks, above a height of 8 m (26 ft) bricks have been used. Due to increasing dilapidation it was partly dismantled in 1791. Since its restoration in 1875 it has been used as an observation tower. The second Bergfried in the outer ward was built in the 1st half of the 13th century. The gatehouse originates from the late 12th/early 13th century while the granary with its impressive roof structure, the Herrenhaus (Lord's residence), and the Pagenhaus (squires' quarters) were rebuilt under Margrave Wilhelm I near the end of the 14th century.

== Attractions ==
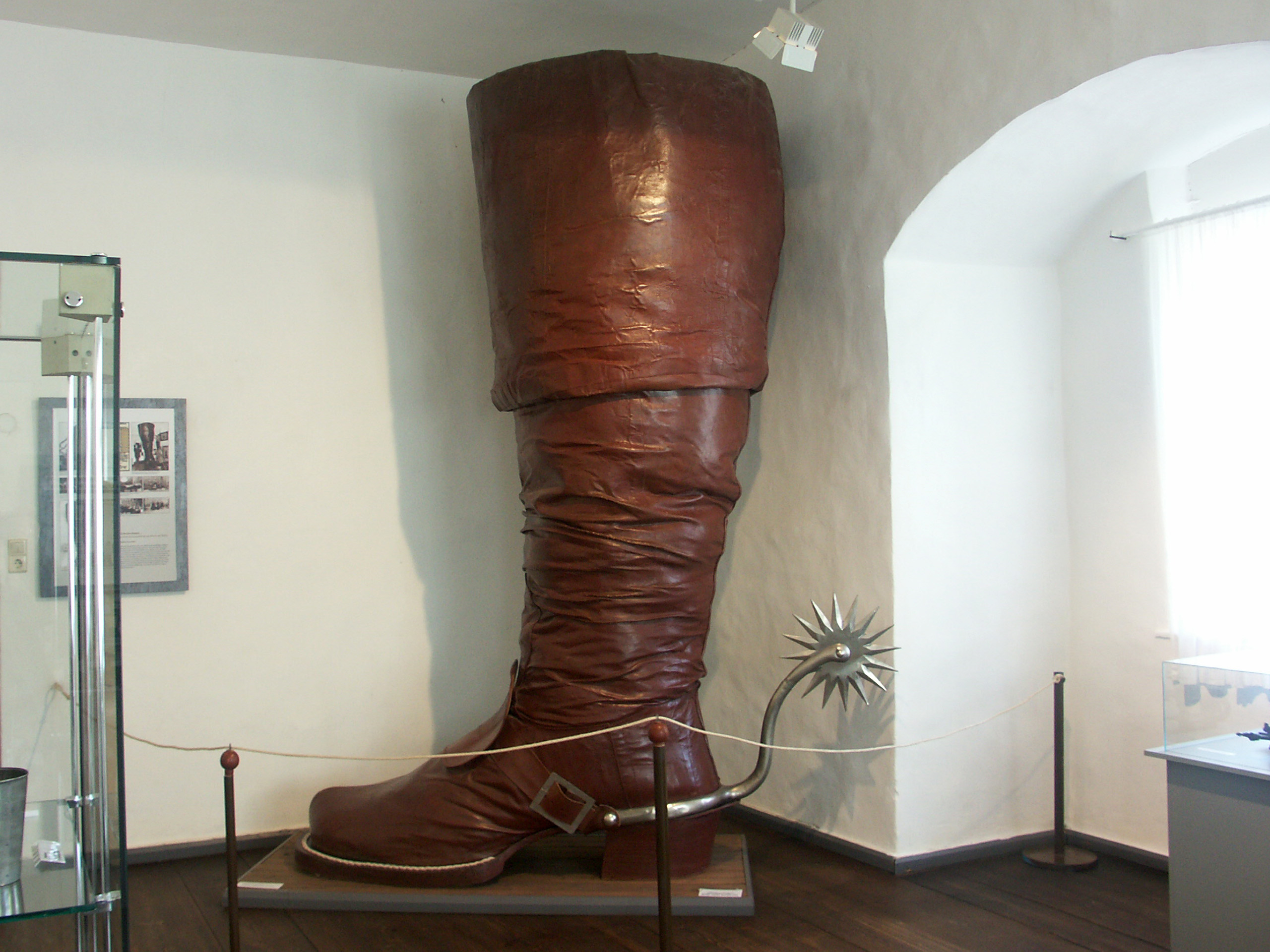
Giant boot in Mildenstein museum (2008)

From 1957 until 2010 the museum had been home to the Giant Boot of Döbeln, a 2.48 m (8 ft 2 in) high riding boot which had been manufactured in 1925 on occasion of the 600th anniversary of the shoemaker's guild of Döbeln and is now shown in Döbeln town hall. In 1996, two Leisnig shoemakers presented another, 4.90 m (16.1 ft) high boot that is exhibited in a building near the castle and is regularly shown on parades.

Permanent exhibitions in the museum are dedicated to Christian art, the life in the castle when it was used as a noble residence, the administrative tasks of the early modern period, and the history of the prison system. Topics of special exhibitions vary from year to year.

The castle also offers guided tours, concerts, reenactment events, and themed events for children and families.
