= Johann George Schmidt =

German architect

Johann Georg Schmidt (1707 – 24 July 1774) was a German architect of the Dresden Baroque. He was a city councillor and the architect of Dresden's second Annenkirche (St Anne's Church) and the Kreuzkirche (Church of the Holy Cross).

== Work ==
Schmidt became well known for his work during the reconstruction of Dresden after the Seven Years' War. He co-designed Dresden's second Annenkirche (St Anne's Church) and the Kreuzkirche (Church of the Holy Cross). He also collaborated with Johann Gottfried Fehre to build the Dreikönigskirche. The new church at the Schloss Weesenstein is also attributed to him.

== Personal life and death ==
He was born in Fürstenwalde bei Geising, and became the brother-in-law, student and successor of George Bähr. He died in Dresden.
