= Frauenstein, Saxony =

Frauenstein
- Town
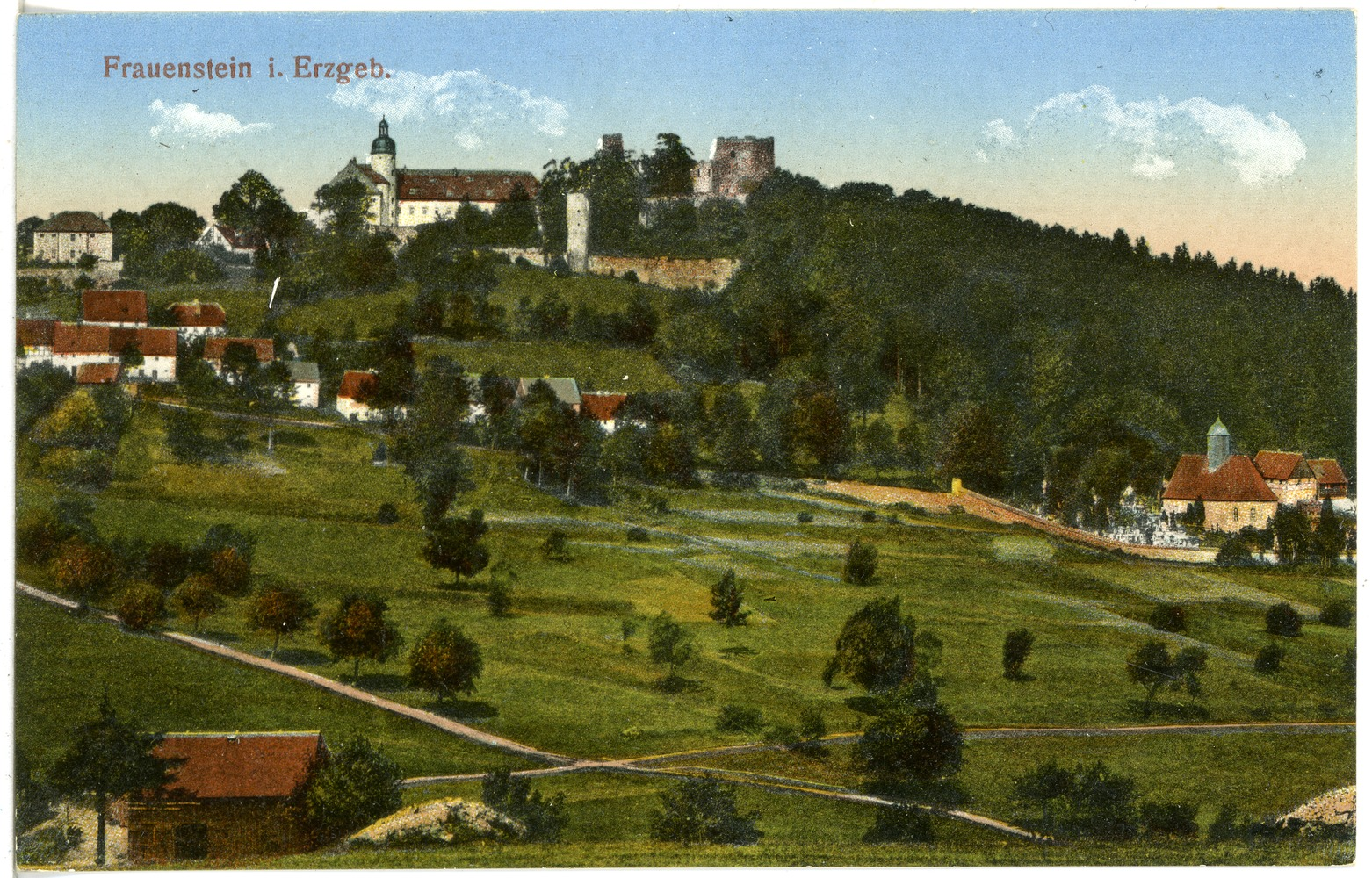

- Coat of arms

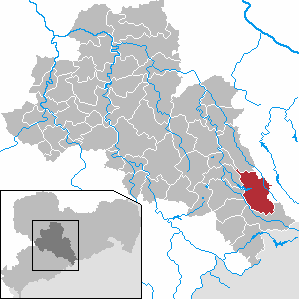
- Location of Frauenstein within Mittelsachsen district
- Interactive map of Frauenstein
- Location within Germany Location within Saxony
- Coordinates: 50°48′7″N 13°32′17″E
- Country: Germany
- State: Saxony
- District: Mittelsachsen
- Subdivisions: 4

Government
  - Mayor (2022–29): Reiner Hentschel

Area
  - Total: 58.99 km^{2} (22.78 sq mi)
- Elevation: 650 m (2,130 ft)

Population (2025-12-31)
  - Total: 2,667
  - Density: 45.21/km^{2} (117.1/sq mi)
- Time zone: UTC+01:00 (CET)
  - Summer (DST): UTC+02:00 (CEST)
- Postal codes: 09623
- Dialling codes: 037326
- Vehicle registration: FG
- Website: www.frauenstein-erzgebirge.de

Frauenstein (German pronunciation: [ˈfʁaʊənˌʃtaɪn]) is a town in the district of Mittelsachsen, in Saxony, Germany. It is situated in the eastern Ore Mountains, 19 km (11.81 mi) southeast of Freiberg, and 33 km (20.51 mi) southwest of Dresden.

Frauenstein Castle is located northeast of the town centre.

== Notable people ==
- Andreas Silbermann (1678–1734), born in Kleinbobritzsch, organ builder
- Gottfried Silbermann (1683–1753), organ builder, born in Kleinbobritzsch, spent his childhood years in Frauenstein from 1686 onwards
- Thomas Schönlebe (born 1965), athlete
