= Schloss Weesenstein =

- Weesenstein, Saxony, Germany
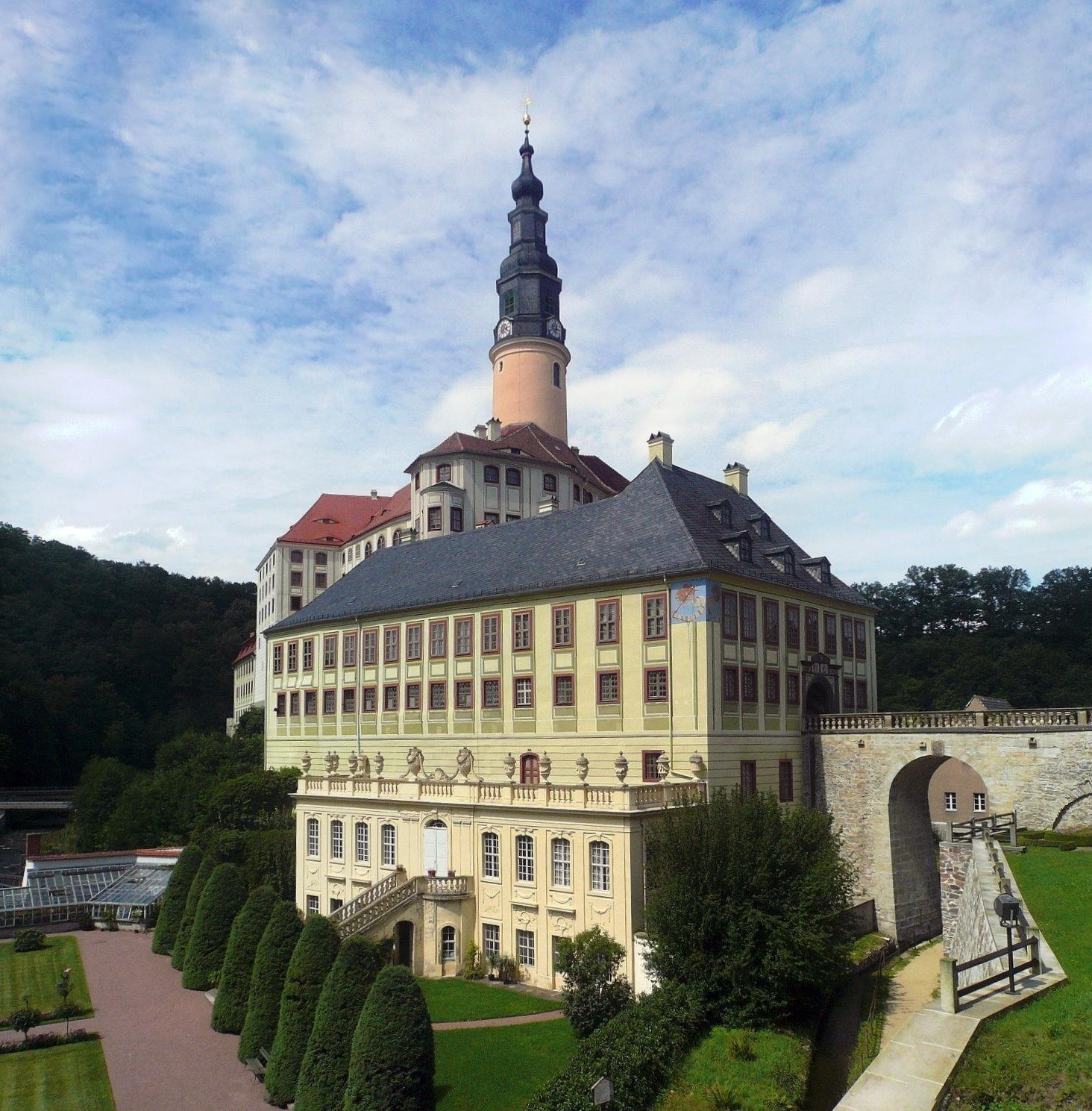
- Schloss Weesenstein

Site information
- Type: Schloss
- Open to the public: Yes

Location
- Location in Germany
- Coordinates: 50.932583°N 13.859361°E

Schloss Weesenstein is a Schloss located in Weesenstein, a small village, part of Müglitztal in the Müglitz river valley, around 3 kilometres (1.9 mi) south of Dohna in Saxony, Germany.

== History ==
A castle was erected here sometime around 1200, built with the purpose of defending the border to the Kingdom of Bohemia; it was mentioned in written sources for the first time in 1318. The oldest part of the presently visible castle is its central round tower, erected sometime around 1300. The castle was built for the burgraves of Dohna; the burgraviate was incorporated in the Margraviate of Meissen in 1400 and in 1406 the castle was transferred by the margrave to the von Bünau family in gratitude for their support in the Dohna Feud. The Bünau family transformed the defensive castle into a residential Schloss in 1526–1575, and successive generations expanded and reconfigured the Schloss in stages. It continued to be the main seat of the family for about 350 years. As a consequence of the Seven Years' War of 1756–1763 the family lost a substantial part of their wealth and had to part with the castle, which passed into the hands of the von Uckermann family. The Uckermanns owned the castle for two generations and continued to embellish the estate, not least the garden.

In 1830 the Schloss was purchased by King Anthony of Saxony. Several members of the Saxon royal family subsequently lived in the castle, including three kings: Anthony, John of Saxony and George of Saxony. In late 1917, during World War I, the castle was sold to an entrepreneur. In 1934 it was acquired by an association for the protection of the heritage of Saxony (German: Landesverein Sächsischer Heimatschutz). During World War II, the castle was used for safekeeping most of the collections of the Kupferstich-Kabinett (Collection of Prints, Drawings and Photographs) of the Staatliche Kunstsammlungen Dresden, the Dresden State Art Collections. Because of this, the castle and its contents were spared from destruction during the bombing of Dresden in World War II. After the war, the castle was used to house refugees before it was taken over by the state. Today it belongs to the state corporation State Palaces, Castles and Gardens of Saxony (German: Staatliche Schlösser, Burgen und Gärten Sachsen). It houses a museum and 35 of the rooms of the castle are open to the public.

== Architecture ==
The presently visible ensemble is the product of centuries of development and rebuilding. The castle is thus a mix of styles, ranging from Gothic architecture to Classical architecture. The main portal, built in 1575, is considered one of the most valuable Renaissance portals in Saxony, The Schloss is built on a rock with storeys descending from the central, medieval round tower (with its 18th-century spire). In total, the castle has eight storeys. The castle contains around 200 rooms in total. The Baroque chapel, described as the "architectural and artistic highlight of the entire castle", is thought to have been designed by Johann George Schmidt. A formal garden lies adjacent to the castle. An English landscape garden, one of the earliest to be created in Saxony (c. 1780), has since been overgrown.

== Gallery ==
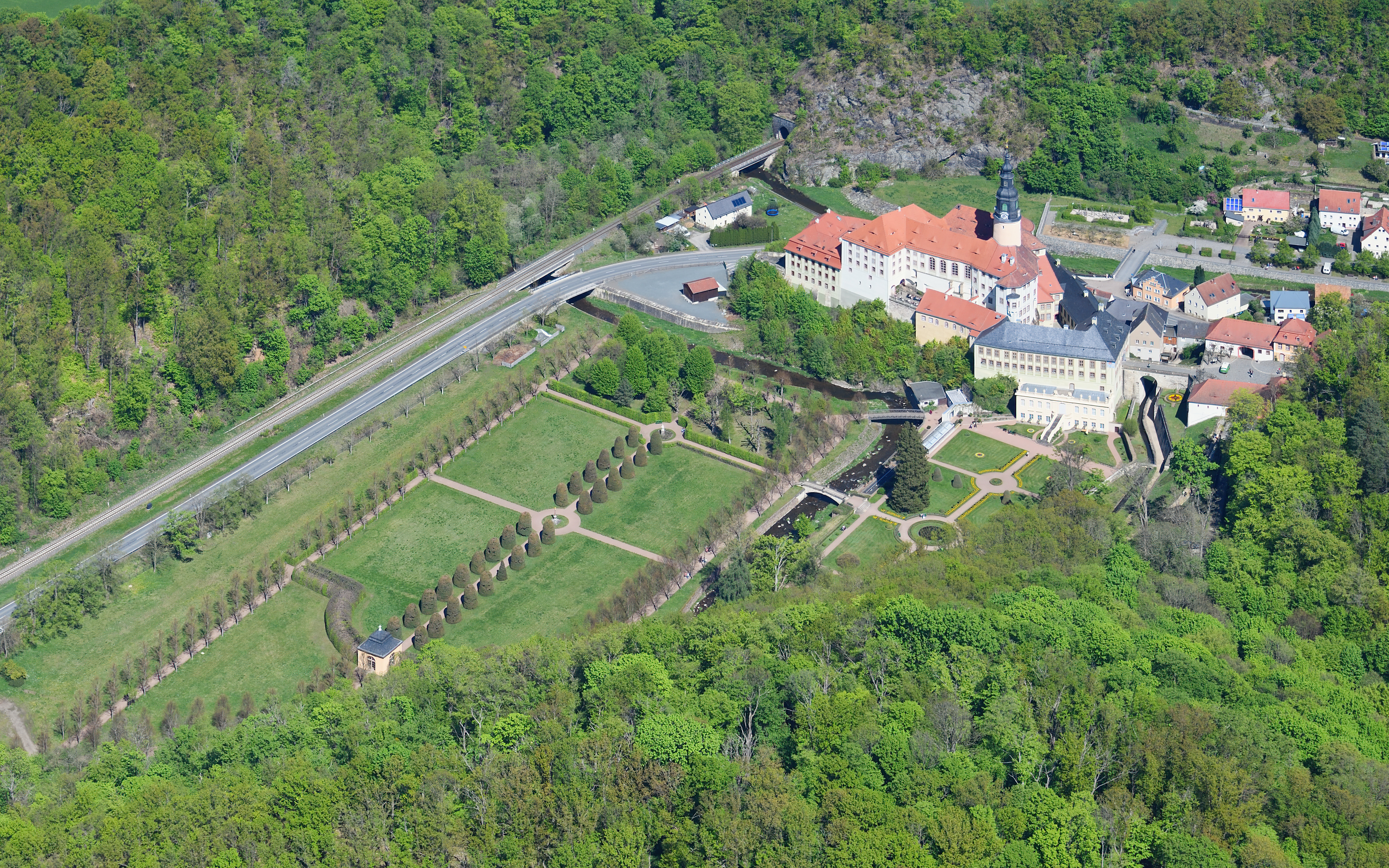
Aerial view

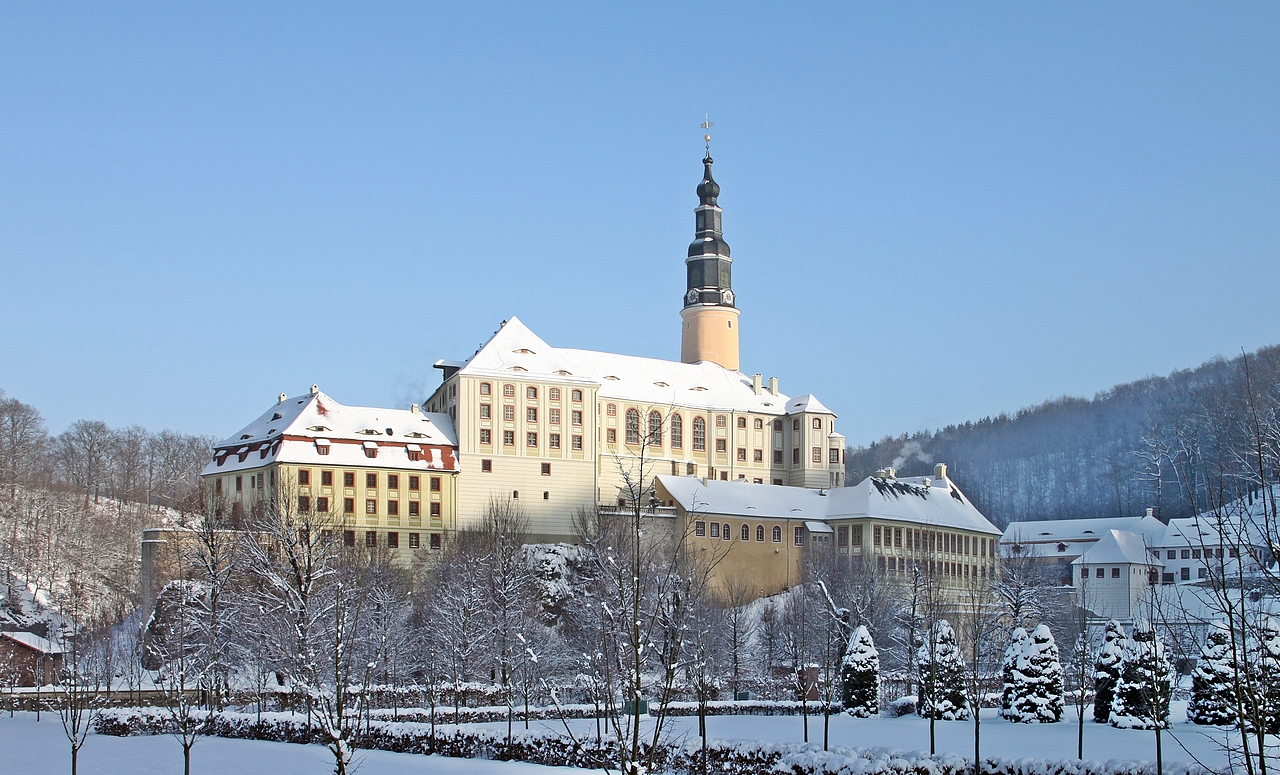
View of the Schloss from a distance

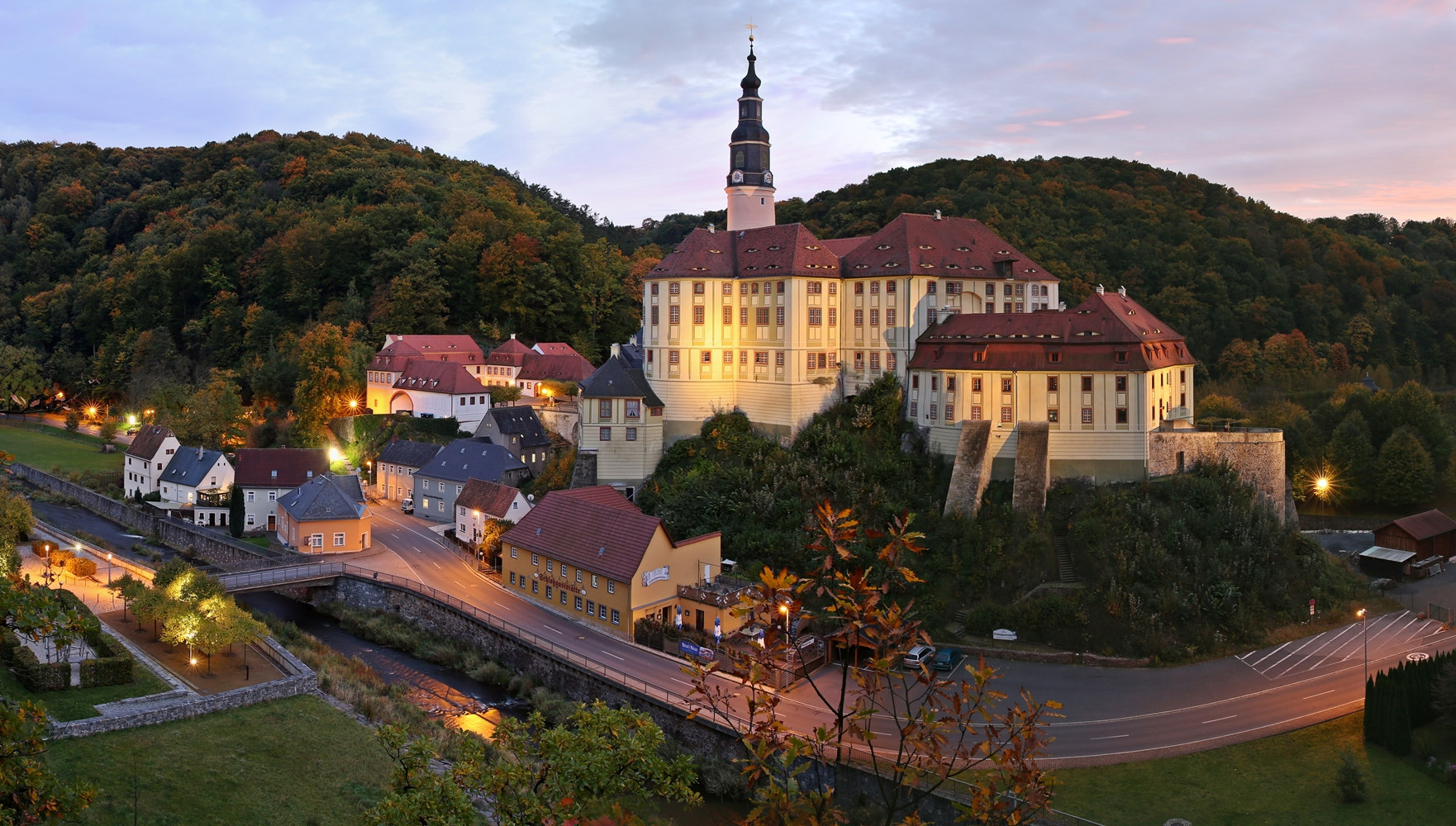
View from north

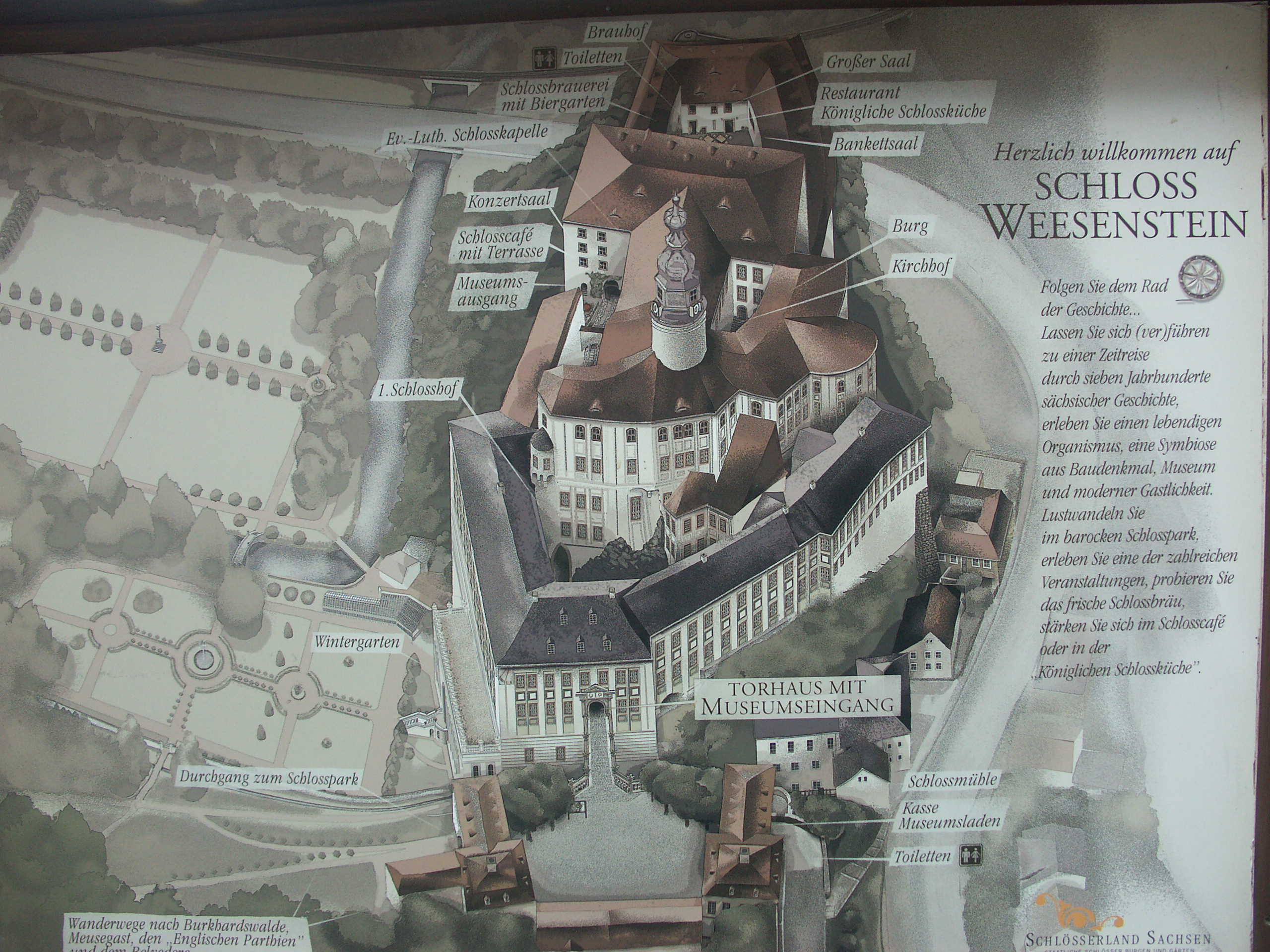
Overview of the layout of the Schloss

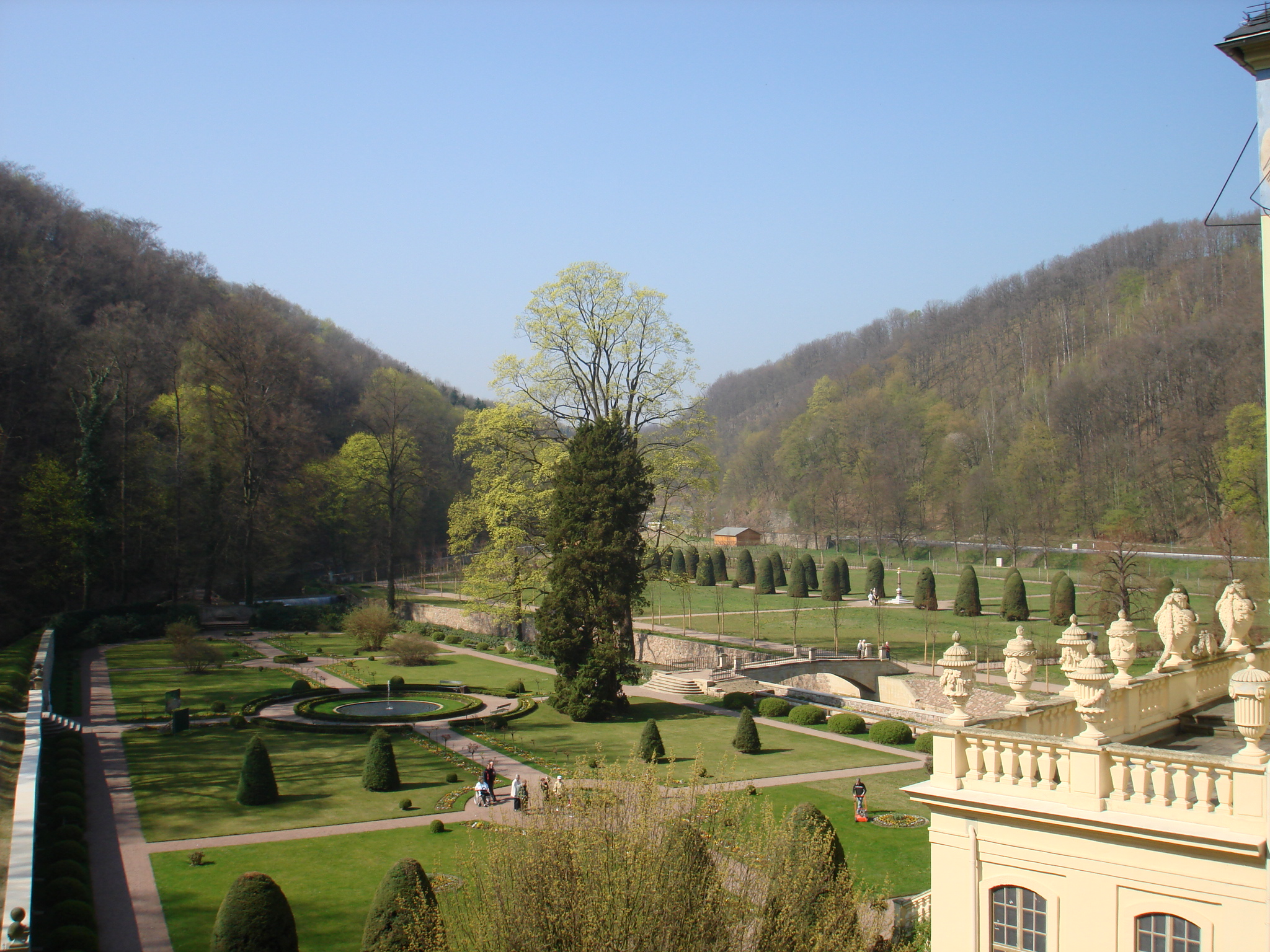
The formal gardens of the Schloss

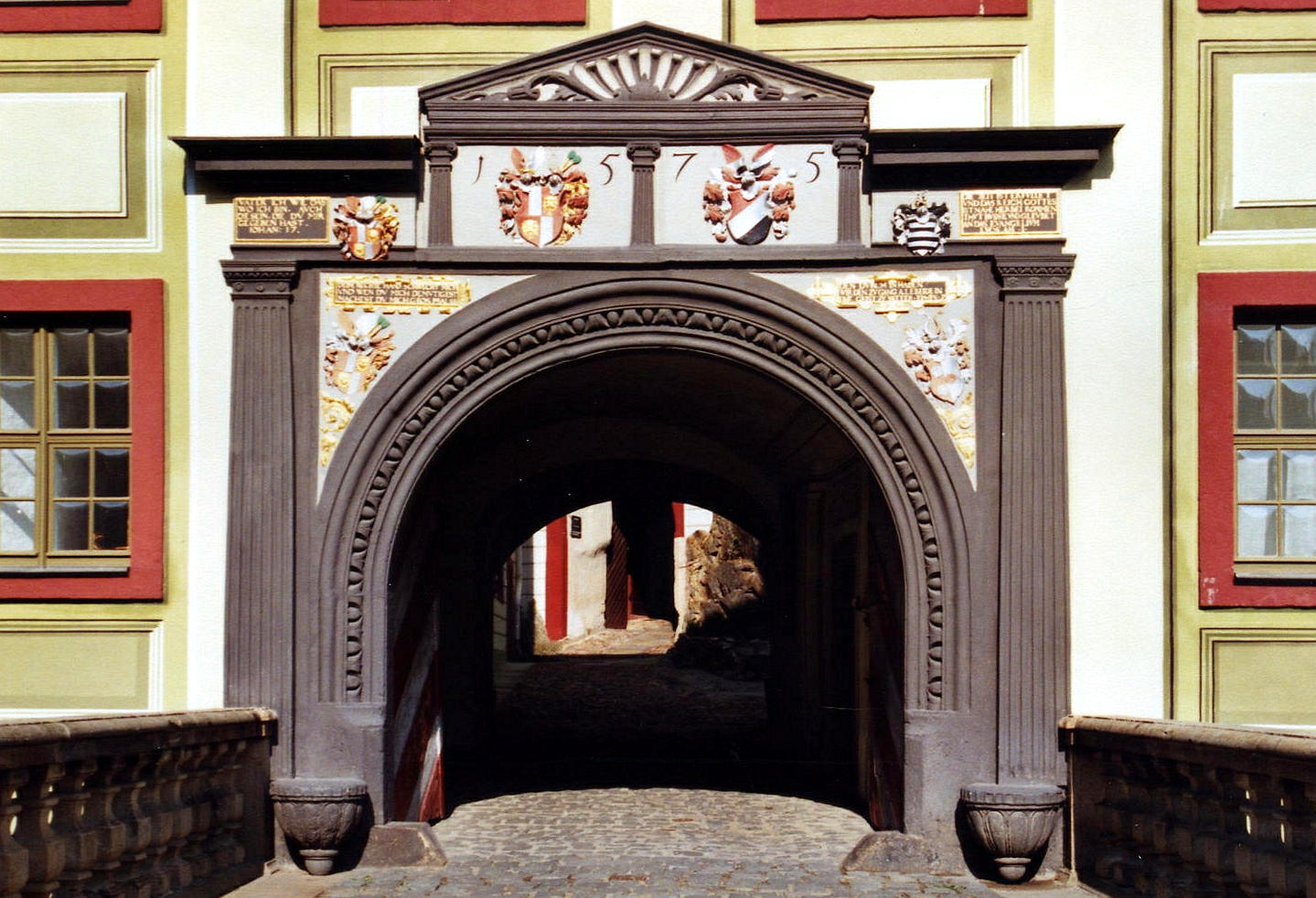
The Renaissance main portal

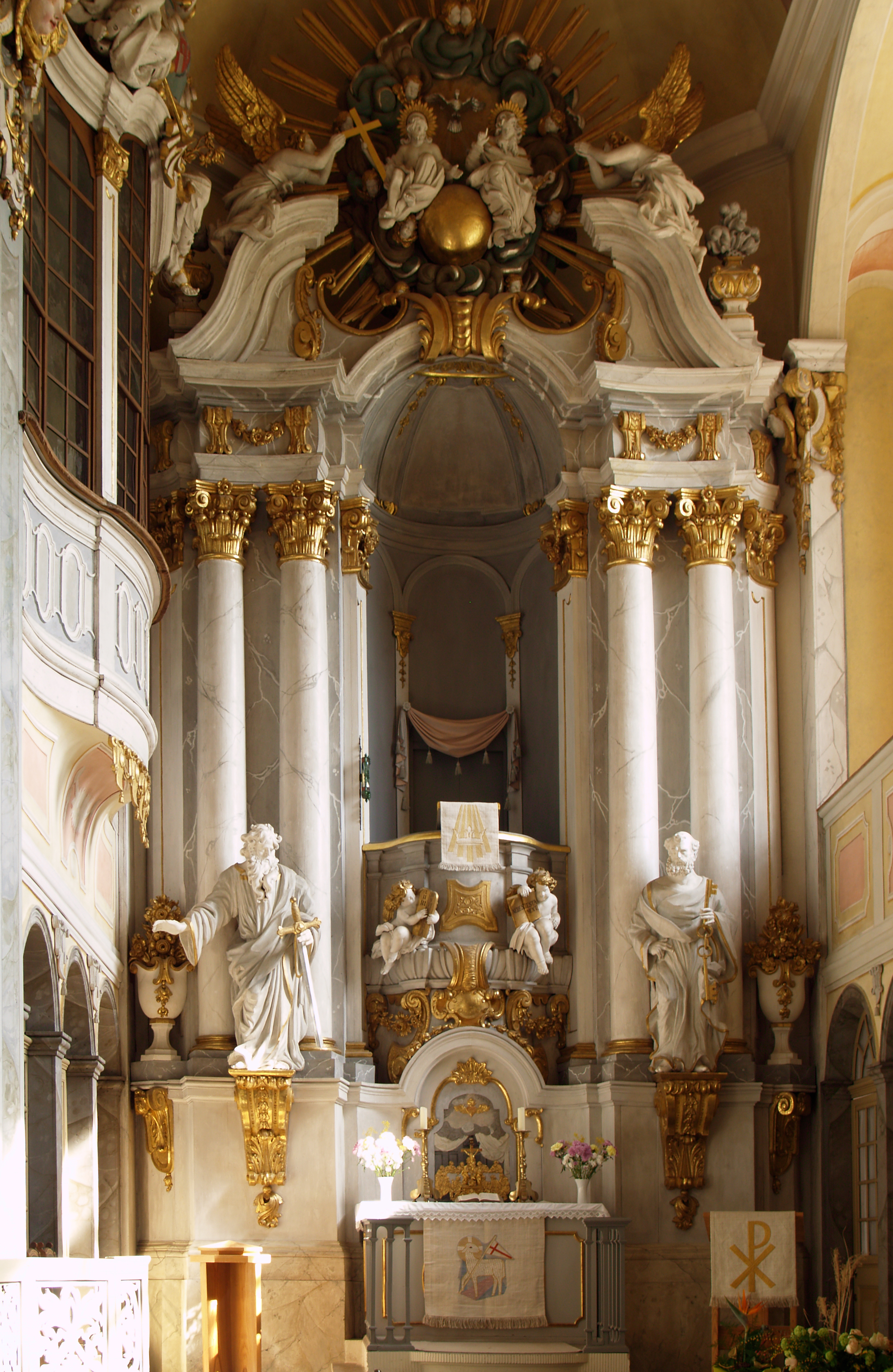
The chapel
