= Rammenau =

- Municipality
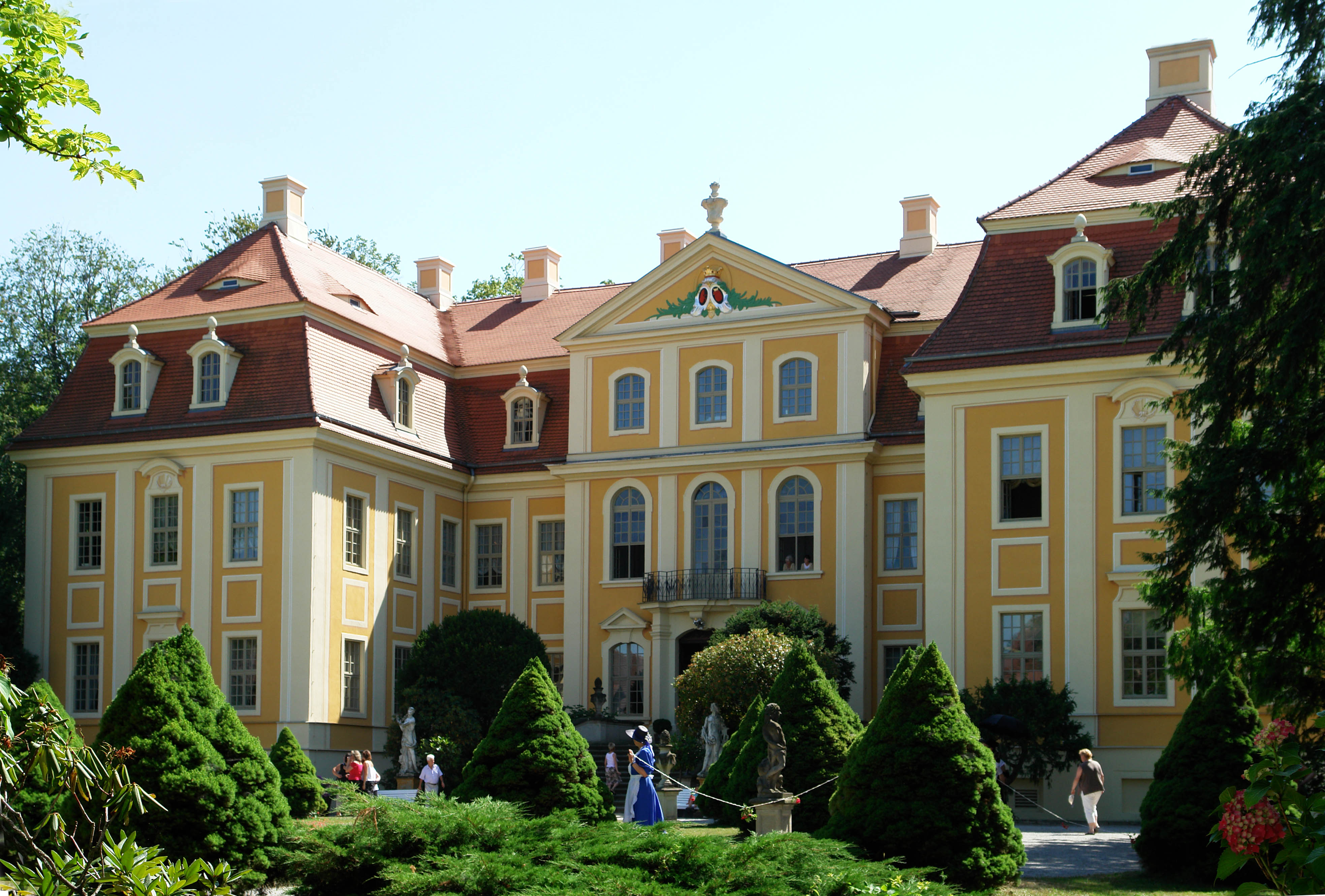
- Rammenau Castle, front side

- Location of Rammenau within Bautzen district
- Interactive map of Rammenau
- Location within Germany Location within Saxony
- Coordinates: 51°9′N 14°8′E
- Country: Germany
- State: Saxony
- District: Bautzen
- Subdivisions: 3

Government
  - Mayor (2017–24): Andreas Langhammer

Area
  - Total: 10.76 km^{2} (4.15 sq mi)
- Elevation: 296 m (971 ft)

Population (2025-12-31)
  - Total: 1,306
  - Density: 121.4/km^{2} (314.4/sq mi)
- Time zone: UTC+01:00 (CET)
  - Summer (DST): UTC+02:00 (CEST)
- Postal codes: 01877
- Dialling codes: 03594
- Vehicle registration: BZ, BIW, HY, KM
- Website: www.rammenau.de

Rammenau (in German; Upper Sorbian: Ramnow, pronounced [ˈʁamnɔf]) is a municipality in the district of Bautzen, in Saxony, Germany.

It is known as the birthplace of the well-known German philosopher Johann Gottlieb Fichte (1762–1814) and of Johann Centurius Hoffmannsegg (1766-1849), botanist, entomologist and ornithologist.

Rammenau Castle was built between 1721 and 1735 by architect Johann Christoph Knöffel for Ernst Ferdinand von Knoch, chamberlain of king Augustus II the Strong. As Knoch went bankrupt with the immense costs of this project, Franz Josef von Hoffmann purchased it in a foreclosure auction in 1744. In 1879 it was sold to the von Posern family, with the last owner, Margarete von Helldorff née von Posern, being expropriated by the communists in 1945. Today it is owned by the State Palaces, Castles and Gardens of Saxony and open to the public, housing a museum with period furniture.

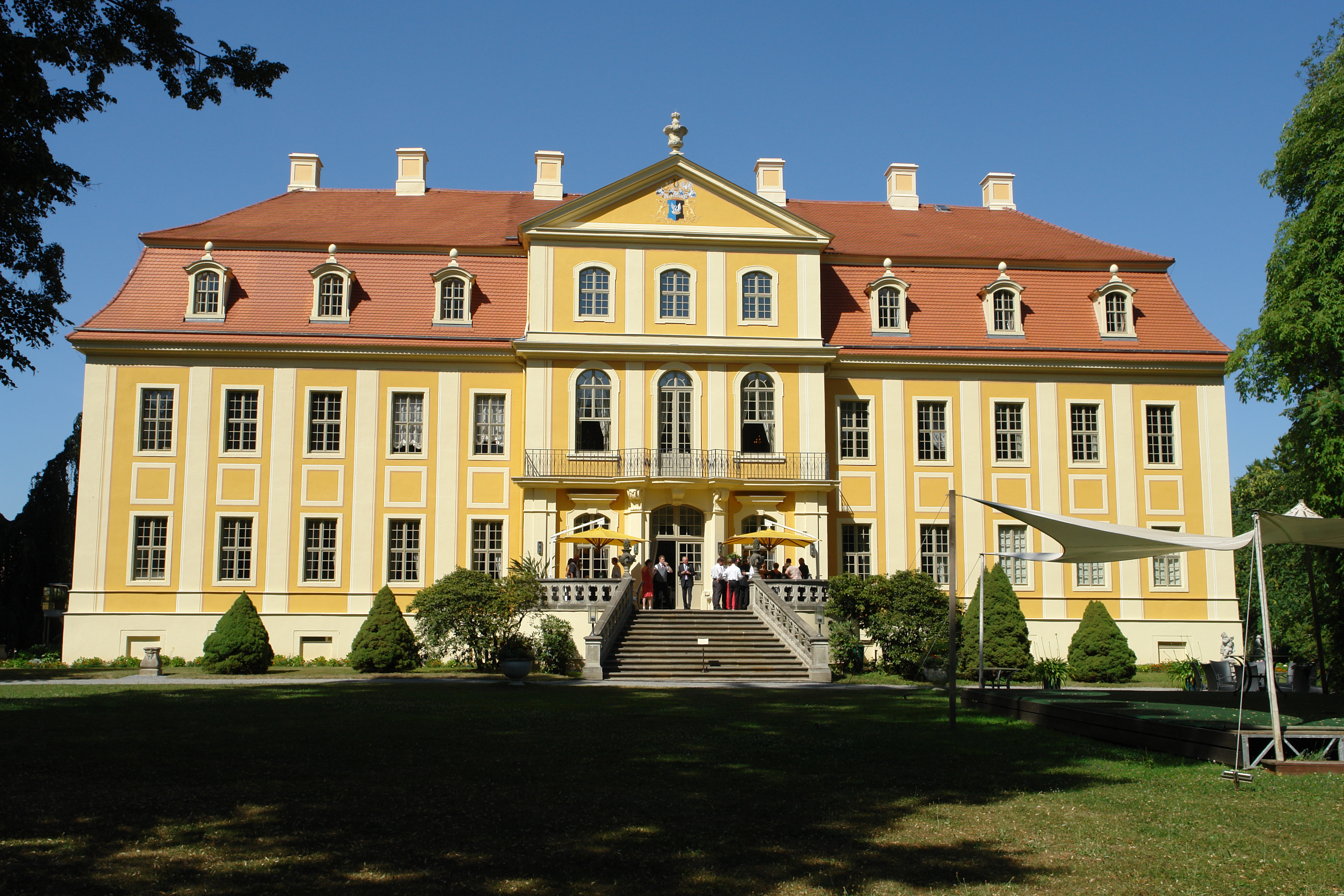
Rammenau Castle, park side

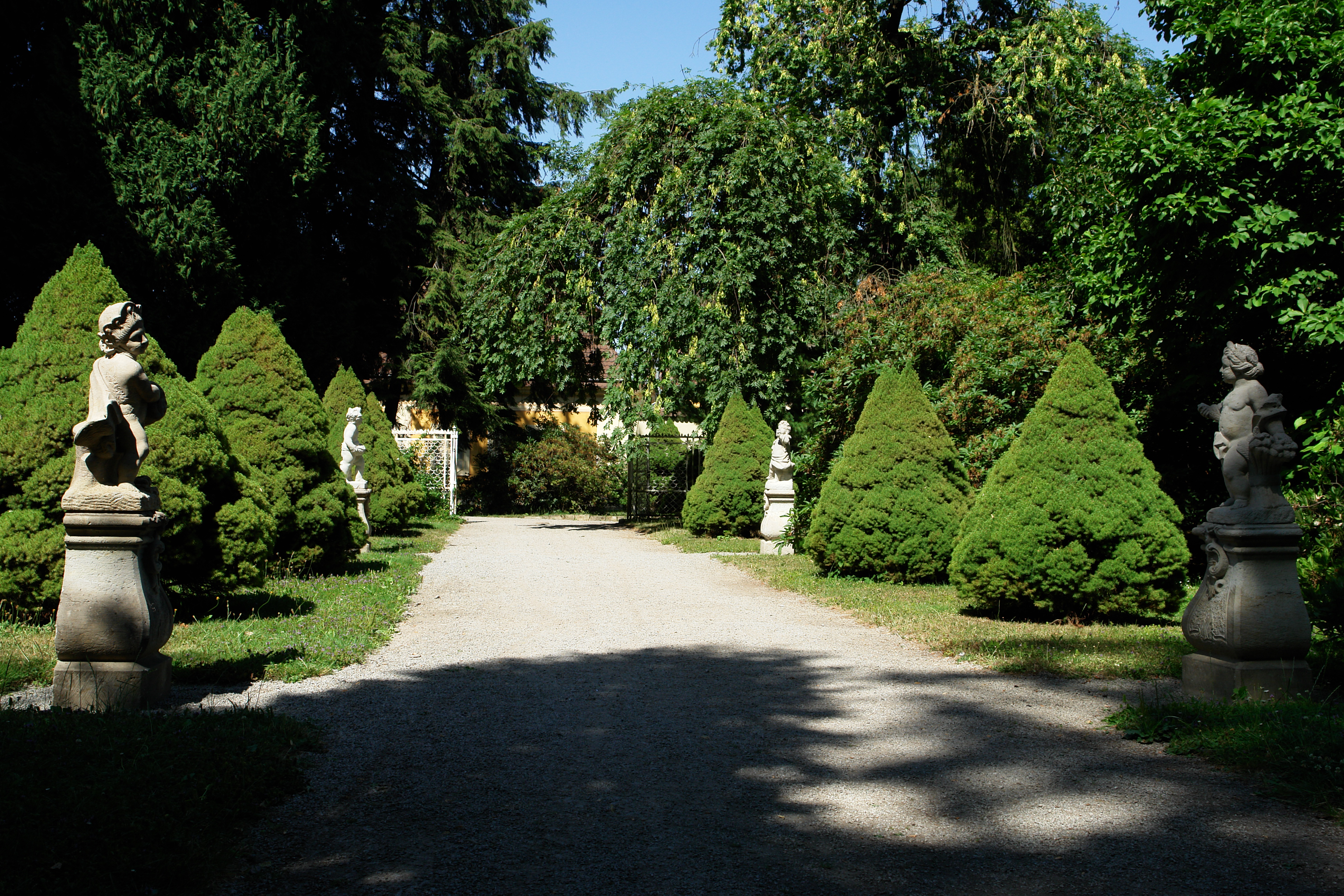
Park

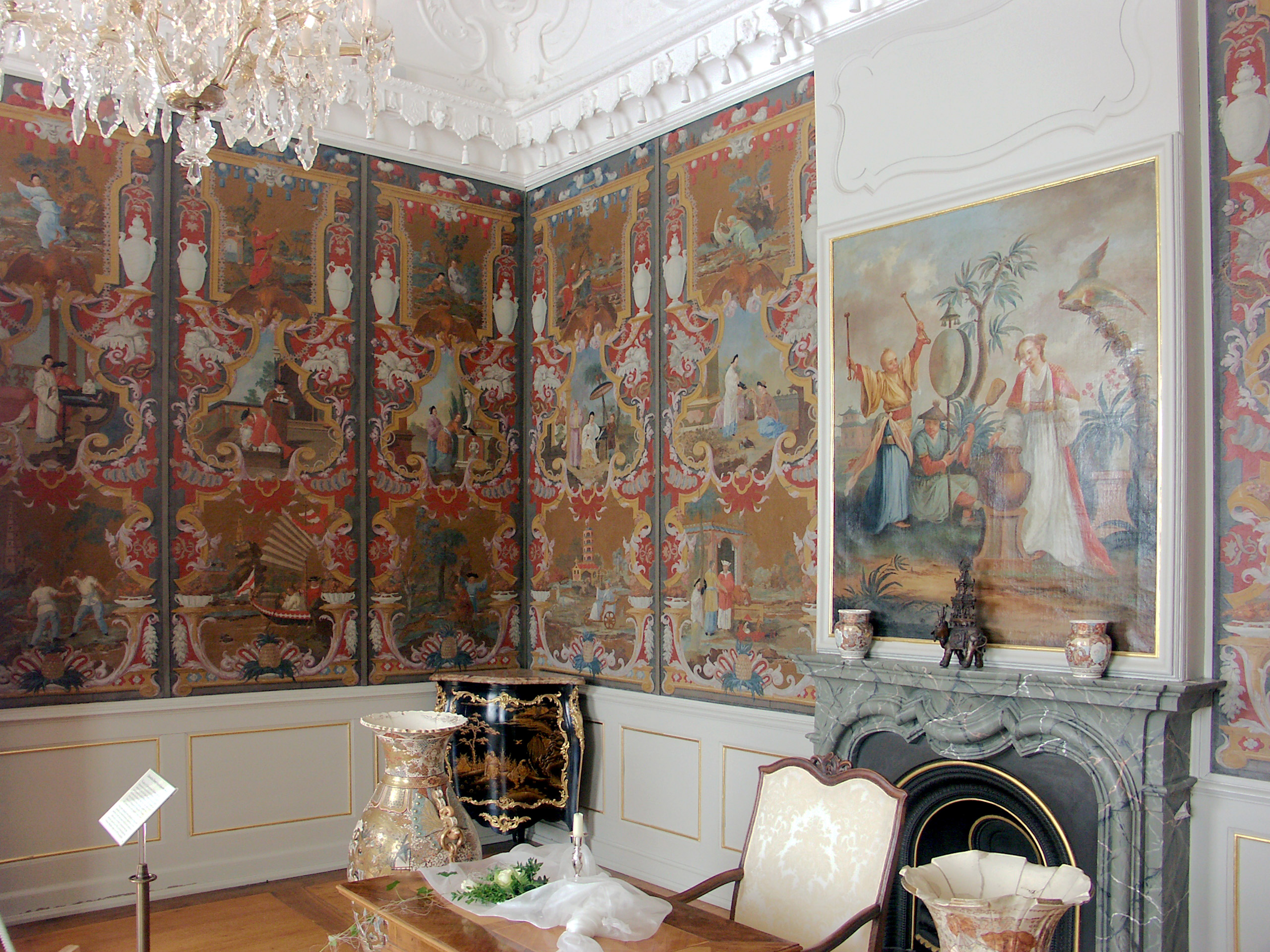
The Chinese Room

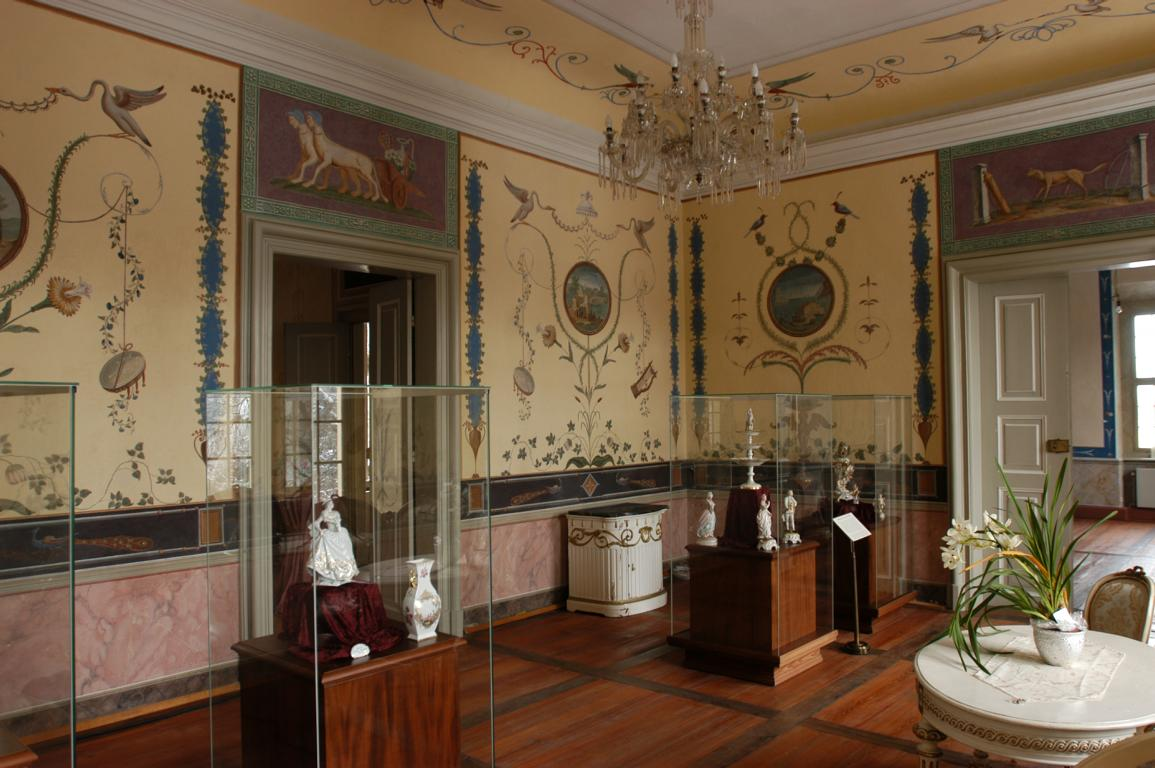
The Pompeiian room

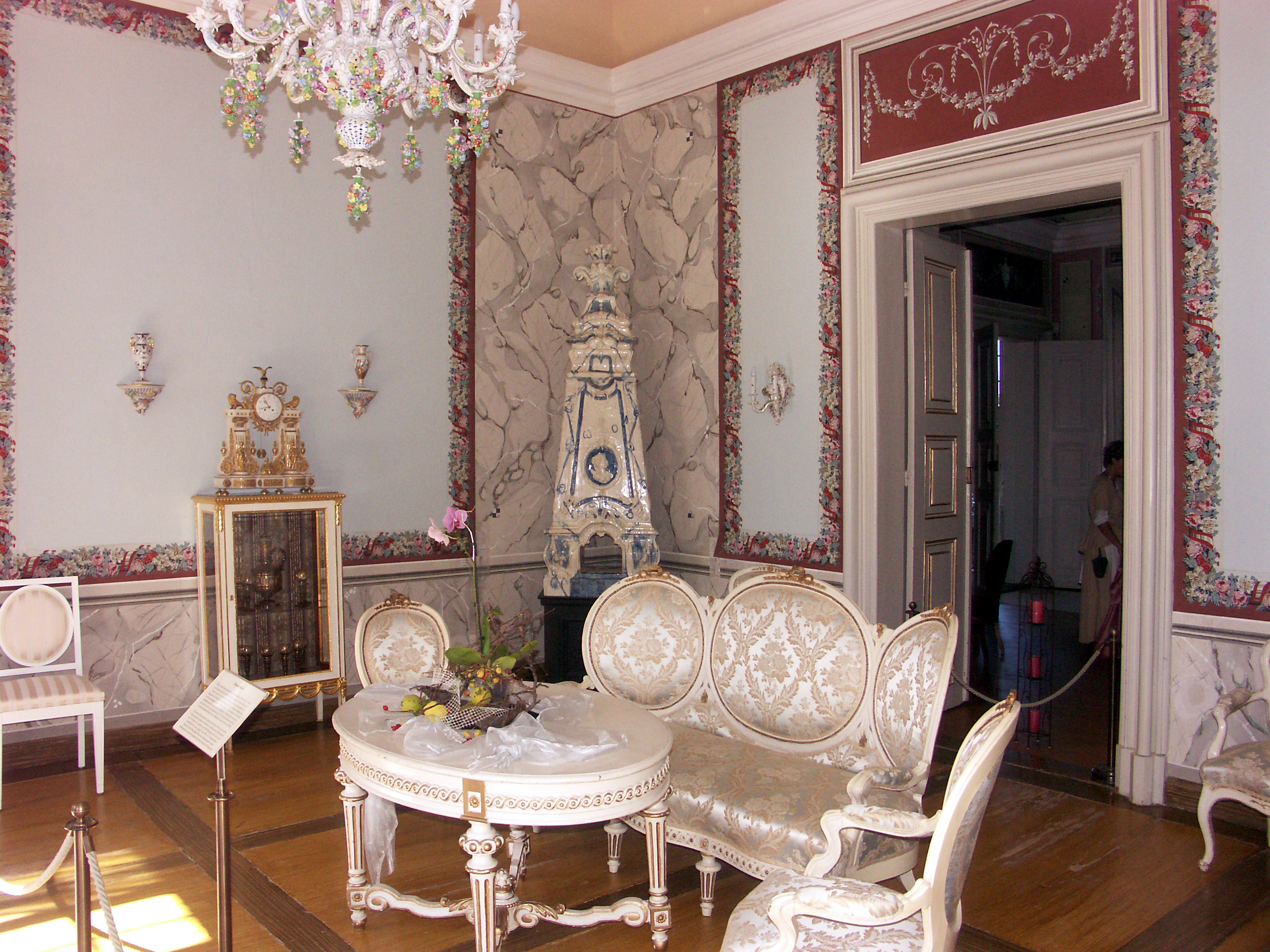
The Blue Room

== See also ==
- List of Baroque residences

== Literature ==
- Schumann, August (1821). "Rammenau". Vollständiges Staats-, Post- und Zeitungslexikon von Sachsen (in German). Vol. 8. Zwickau. p. 747.
