= Gnandstein Castle =

Castle

Coordinates: 51°01′05″N 12°34′34″E

Burg Gnandstein or Gnandstein Castle is located in Gnandstein, part of the city of Kohren-Sahlis in the Leipziger Land district of Saxony, Germany. The castle is considered the best preserved fortress in Saxony.

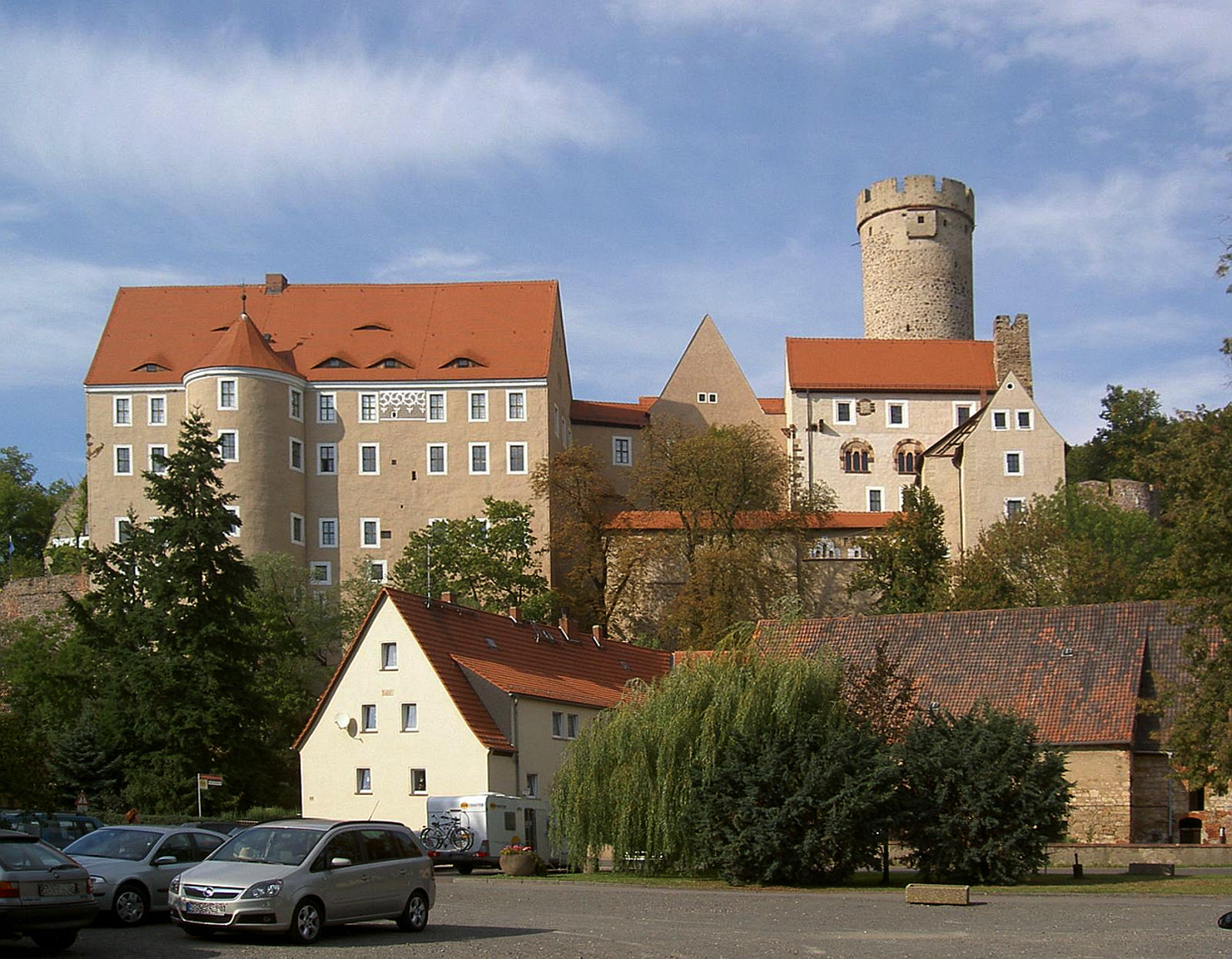
Gnandstein Castle viewed from the parking lot

== Geography ==
The castle stands on a hill overlooking the valley of the river Wyhra in central Saxony. It is situated on the border with Thuringia.

== History ==
The castle was built in the Romanesque style in the 13th century, probably only with a rectangular groundplan and a residential tower. Parts of the present building still date from this early period. The external walls were extended several times.

During the Thirty Years' War the castle was attacked by Swedish troops and partly destroyed. Shortly before the end of the war the south wing burned down after being struck by lightning.

== Well house ==
The well house is more than 33 meters high. It was used as a watch tower.

Wooden replica of the fortress

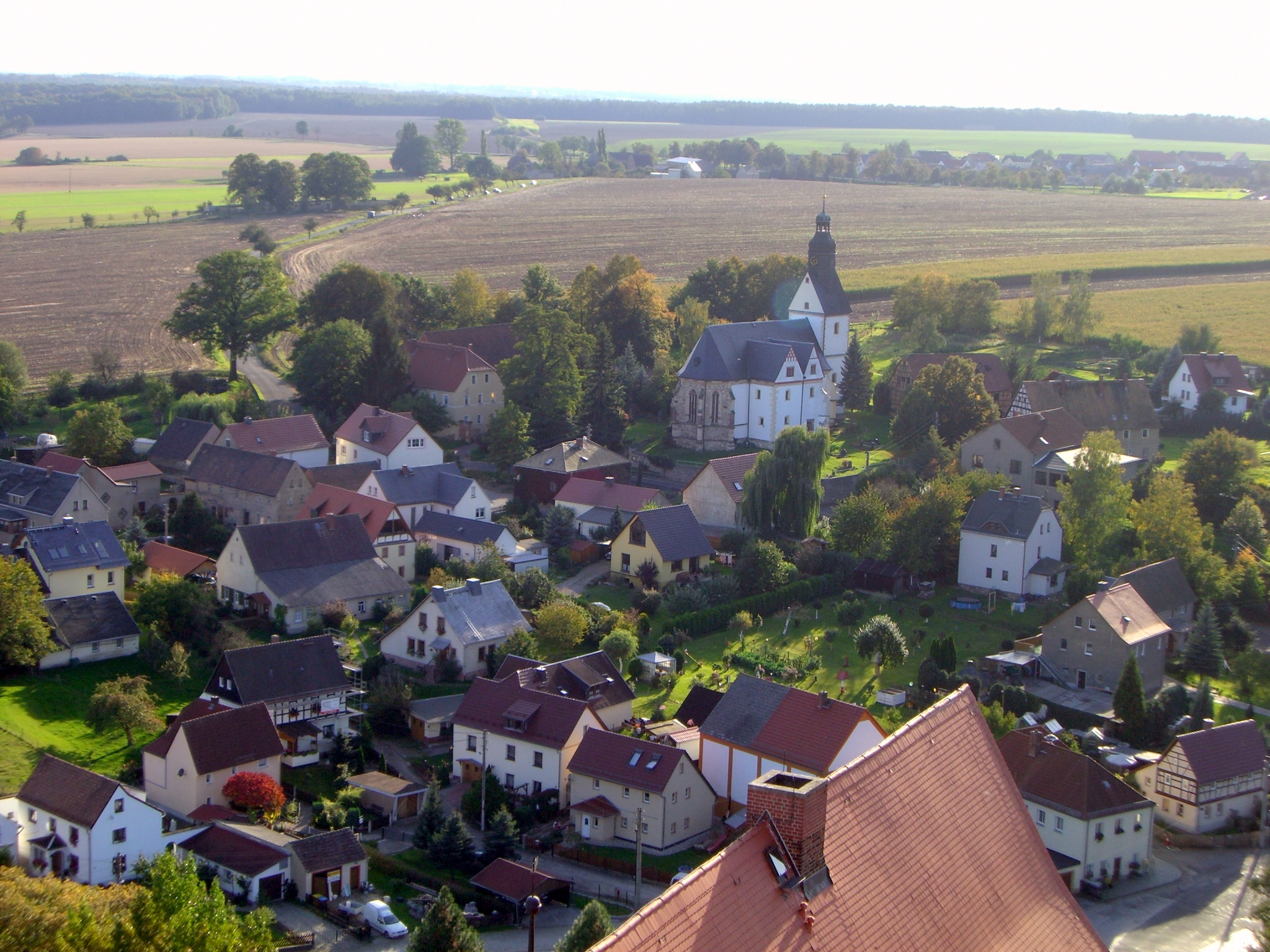
View from the top of the well house

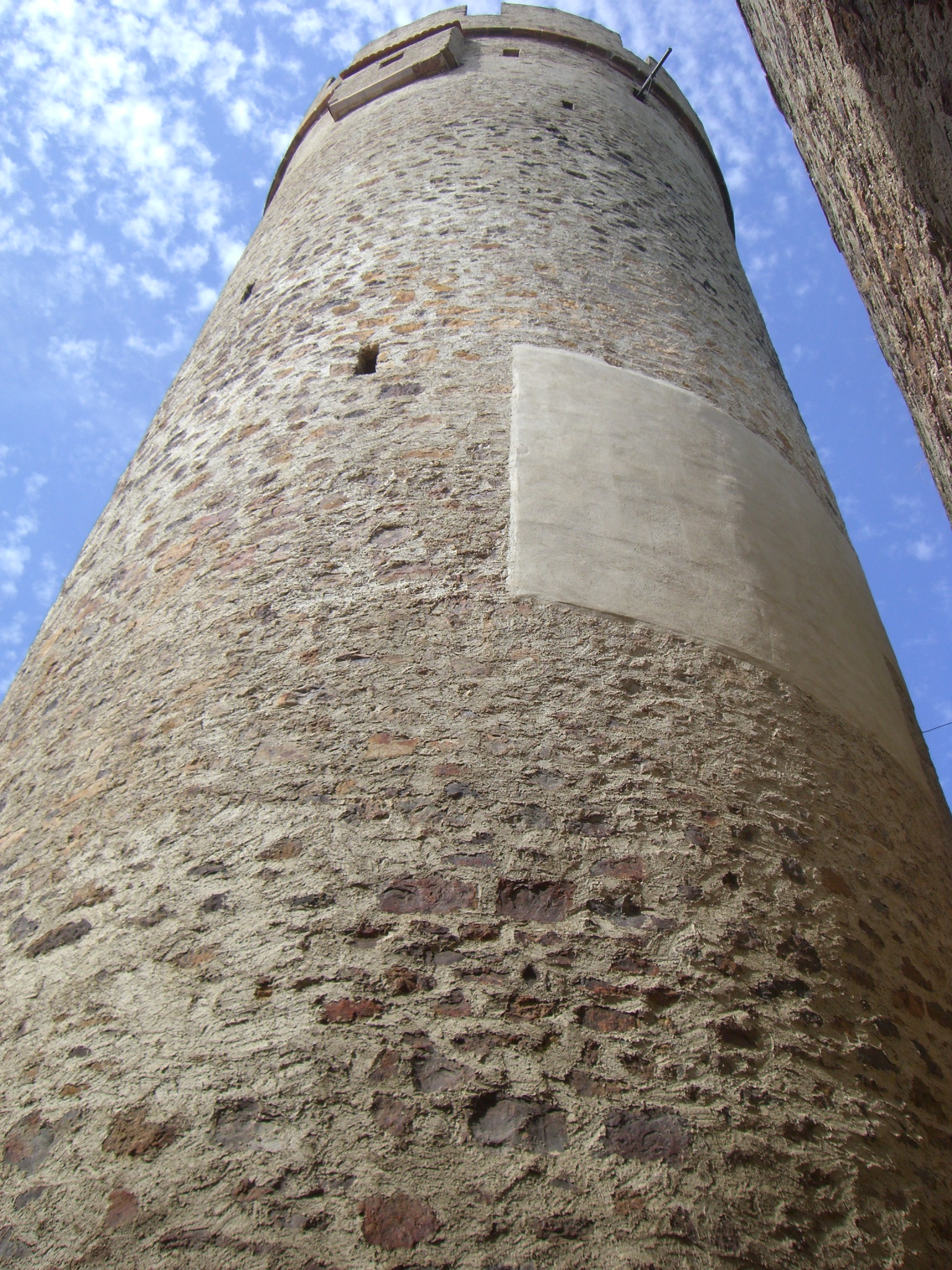
The well house from below

this article is based on that in the German Wikipedia
