= Mutzschen =

- Stadtteil of Grimma
- Coat of arms
- Interactive map of Mutzschen
- Location within Germany Location within Saxony
- Coordinates: 51°16′N 12°54′E
- Country: Germany
- State: Saxony
- District: Leipzig
- Town: Grimma
- Subdivisions: 8

Area
  - Total: 29.38 km^{2} (11.34 sq mi)
- Elevation: 169 m (554 ft)

Population (2010-12-31)
  - Total: 2,272
  - Density: 77.33/km^{2} (200.3/sq mi)
- Time zone: UTC+01:00 (CET)
  - Summer (DST): UTC+02:00 (CEST)
- Postal codes: 04688
- Dialling codes: 034385
- Vehicle registration: L
- Website: www.mutzschen.de

Mutzschen (German pronunciation: [ˈmʊtʃən]) is a former town in the Leipzig district, in the Free State of Saxony, Germany. It is situated 13 km east of Grimma, and 21 km northwest of Döbeln. With effect from 1 January 2012, it has been incorporated into the town of Grimma.
