= Müglitztal =

- Municipality
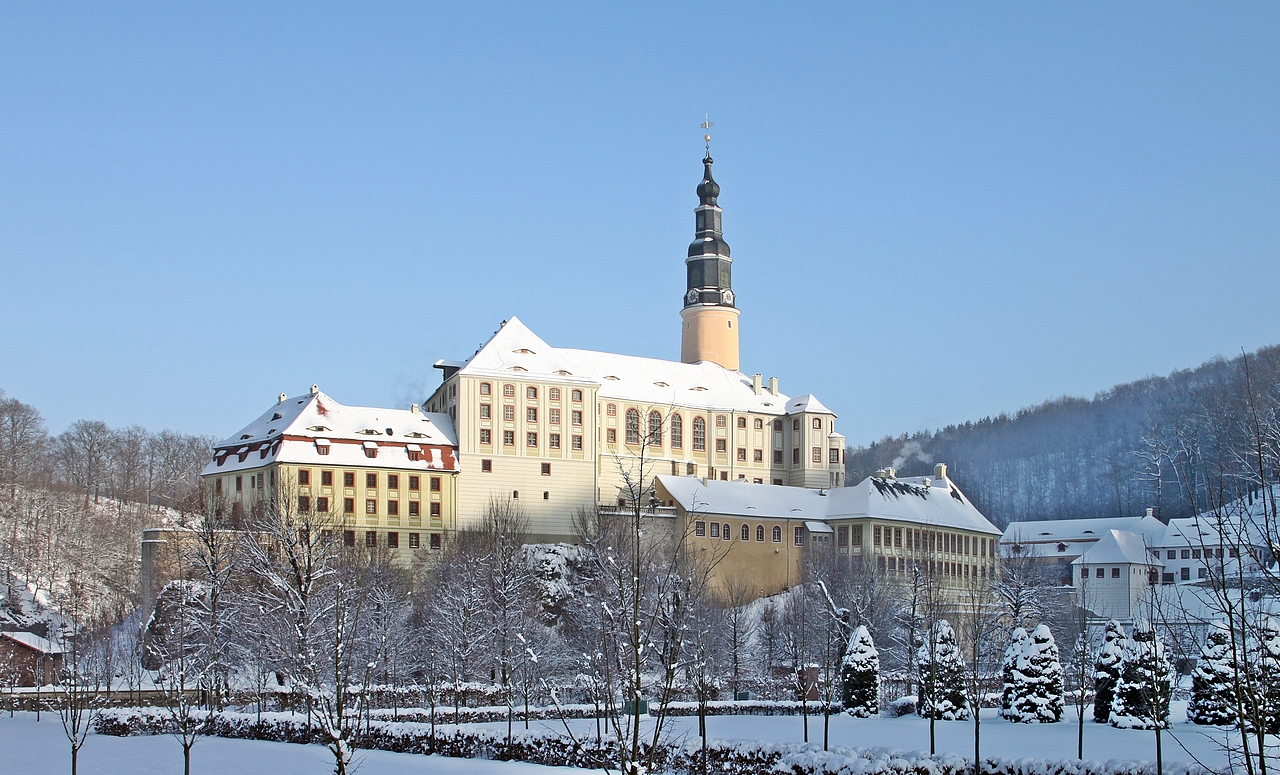
- Weesenstein Castle

- Coat of arms

- Location of Müglitztal within Sächsische Schweiz-Osterzgebirge district
- Interactive map of Müglitztal
- Location within Germany Location within Saxony
- Coordinates: 50°55′N 13°49′E
- Country: Germany
- State: Saxony
- District: Sächsische Schweiz-Osterzgebirge
- Subdivisions: 7

Government
  - Mayor (2018–25): Michael Neumann

Area
  - Total: 21.00 km^{2} (8.11 sq mi)
- Elevation: 150–450 m (490–1,480 ft)

Population (2025-12-31)
  - Total: 1,882
  - Density: 89.62/km^{2} (232.1/sq mi)
- Time zone: UTC+01:00 (CET)
  - Summer (DST): UTC+02:00 (CEST)
- Postal codes: 01809
- Dialling codes: 035027
- Vehicle registration: PIR
- Website: www.oberelbe.de

Müglitztal is a municipality in the Sächsische Schweiz-Osterzgebirge district, in Saxony, Germany.
