= Kriebstein Castle =

- Burg Kriebstein
- Kriebstein
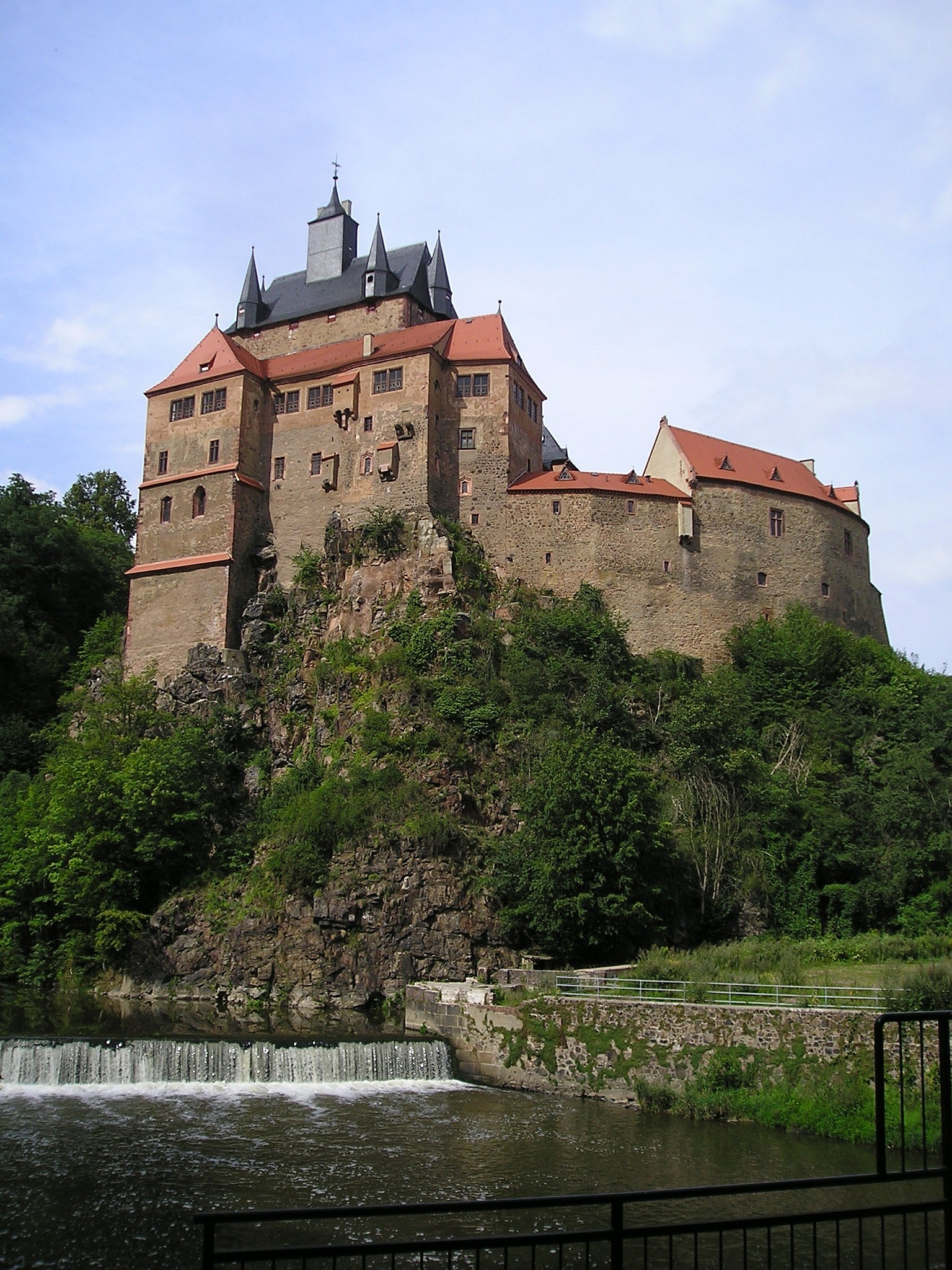
- Kriebstein Castle

Site information
- Type: hill castle, spur castle
- Code: DE-SN
- Condition: preserved

Location
- Location within Germany
- Coordinates: 51°02′32″N 13°01′03″E
- Height: 0 m above sea level (NN)

Site history
- Built: after 1384

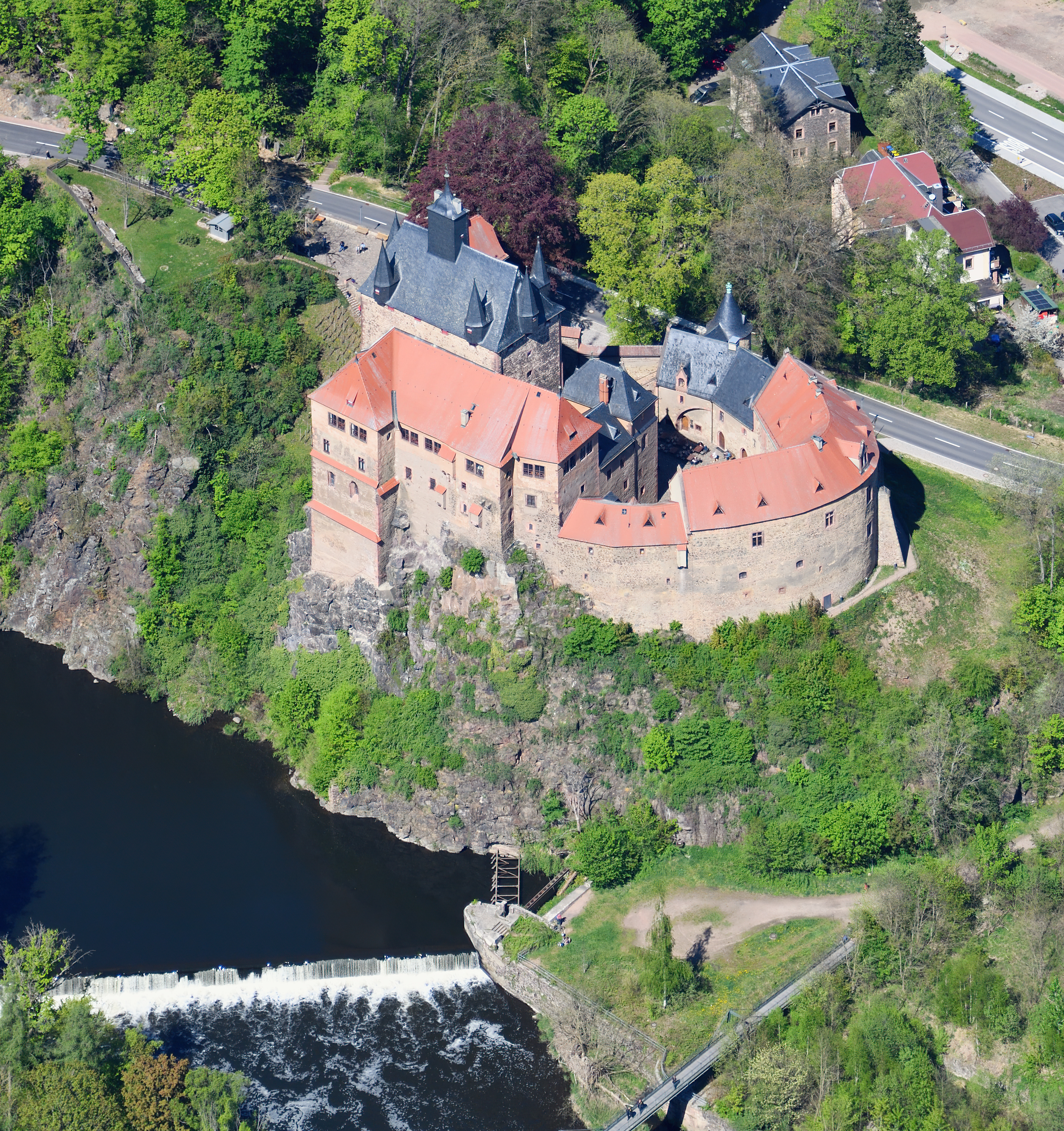
Aerial view

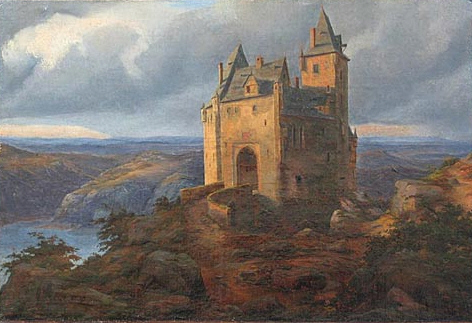
Carl Friedrich Lessing: Kriebstein Castle around 1840

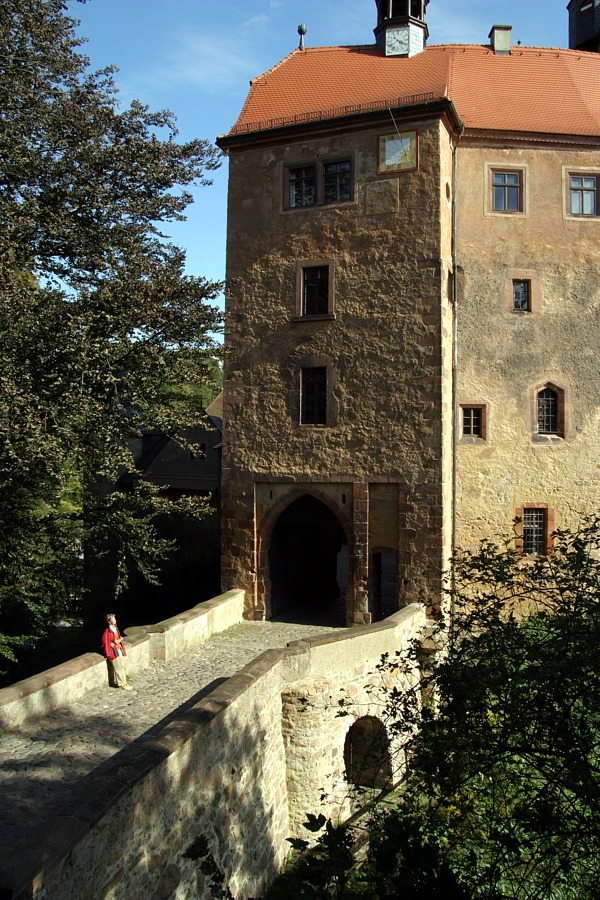
Entrance over the moat (north side)

Kriebstein Castle (German: Burg Kriebstein) is a castle in Kriebstein near the town of Waldheim in the German state of Saxony.

== Location ==
The castle rises above steep crags over the River Zschopau. Within the topographical grouping of hill castles it is classified as a spur castle because it lies on the extreme end of a hill spur surrounded on three sides by the Zschopau that flows around the spur in a large bow.

== Layout ==
The rock on which the castle stands is separated from rising ground behind it by a man-made section of ditch, the so-called Halsgraben. Typologically the Kriebstein is a combination of a tower castle (Turmburg) and a ringwork castle (Ringburg) with an oval ground plan. Dominating the whole site is the monumental keep perched atop the highest crag. With its sides measuring 22 x 12 metres, the tower, including its weather vane, reaches a height of 45 metres. Its late medieval oriel turrets and the flèche give the castle a unique and thus unmistakable silhouette. Around the keep are grouped the tower-shaped gatehouse, the curtain wall with its domestic wing, the kitchen and other buildings including the chapel wing. On the east side of the chapel wing is the double-bay, cross-ribbed vaulted Gothic hall and the rear of the castle. This building complex, immediately above the steep slopes over the Zschopau river, has a continuous upper storey dating to the 17th century. The Late Gothic kitchen building is attached directly to the keep at the centre of the castle. The whole is enclosed by a domestic wing, that was used as a great hall (today as a concert and event chamber; weddings also take place at the castle) and contained the well house as well as the northern defensive wall that joined onto the gatehouse.

== Sources ==
- Cornelius Gurlitt: Beschreibende Darstellung der älteren Bau- und Kunstdenkmäler des Kgr. Sachsen. Heft 25. Ah. Döbeln, Dresden 1903, pp. 87–104.
- Otto Eduard Schmidt: Burg Kriebstein – Ein Denkmal mitteldeutscher Geschichte und Kultur. In: Mitteilungen des Landesvereins Sächsischer Heimatschutz. Band 23, Heft 9–12, 1934, pp. 193–232.
- Otto Eduard Schmidt: Die mittelalterlichen Fresken der Burgkapelle zu Kriebstein. In: Mitteilungen des Landesvereins Sächsischer Heimatschutz. Band 27, Heft 1–4, 1938, pp. 43–51.
- Jochen Pfob: Wie alt ist Burg Kriebstein tatsächlich? In: Erzgebirgische Heimatblätter. No. 3, 1980, ISSN 0232-6078, pp. 64–65.
- Wolfgang Schwabenickv: Die hochmittelalterliche Wehranlage "Waal" in Beerwalde, Kr. Hainichen. In: Arbeits- und Forschungsberichte zur sächsischen Bodendenkmalpflege. Heft 24/25. Berlin 1982, pp. 311–382.
- Bernd Wippert: Zur Baugeschichte der Burg Kriebstein. In: Mitteilungen des Landesvereins Sächsischer Heimatschutz e. V. Nr. 2, 1993, ISSN 0941-1151, pp. 11–15.
- Peter Petersen: Dendrochronologische Untersuchungen auf der Burg Kriebstein/Sachsen. In: Forschungen zu Burgen und Schlössern. Band 1. Wartburg-Gesellschaft, München, Berlin 1994, ISBN 3-422-06136-3, pp. 95–103.
- Bernd Wippert: Ein „vergessenes“ Gewölbe - zu neuem Leben erweckt. Das Schatzgewölbe auf Burg Kriebstein. In: Sächsische Schlösserverwaltung (Hrsg.): Jahrbuch 1995 der Staatlichen Schlösser, Burgen und Gärten in Sachsen. Dresden o. J., pp. 179–183.
- Wolfgang Schwabenickv: Die Anfänge der Burg und Herrschaft Kriebstein; in: Schwabenickv, Wolfgang (Hrsg.): Archäologie und Baugeschichte – Forschungsberichte aus dem Landkreis Hainichen, Mittweida 1994, pp. 5–16.
- Bernd Wippert, Gabriele Wippert: Burg Kriebstein (= DKV-Kunstführer. Nr. 548). München, Berlin (2000).
- Bernd Wippert: Das Kriebsteinzimmer auf Burg Kriebstein. In: Sächsische Schlösserverwaltung im Landesamt für Finanzen (Hrsg.): Jahrbuch der Staatlichen Schlösser, Burgen und Gärten in Sachsen. Band 7. Dresden 2001, pp. 30–37.
- Peter Petersen, Bernd Wippert: Burg Kriebstein. Ein Architekturführer. Leipzig 2004, ISBN 3-361-00560-4.
- Peter Petersen, Bernd Wippert: Burg Kriebstein. Vom Wandel niederadliger Wohnvorstellungen im 15. Jahrhundert. In: Burgenbau im späten Mittelalter II (= Forschungen zu Burgen und Schlössern. Band 12). Wartburg-Gesellschaft, München, Berlin 2009, ISBN 978-3-422-06895-7, pp. 79–94.
- Annette Binninger: Der Schatz von Kriebstein kehrt heim nach Ostpreußen. In: Sächsische Zeitung. Ausgabe vom 13./14. February 2010.
