= Frauenstein Castle (Ore Mountains) =

- Burg Frauenstein
- Frauenstein
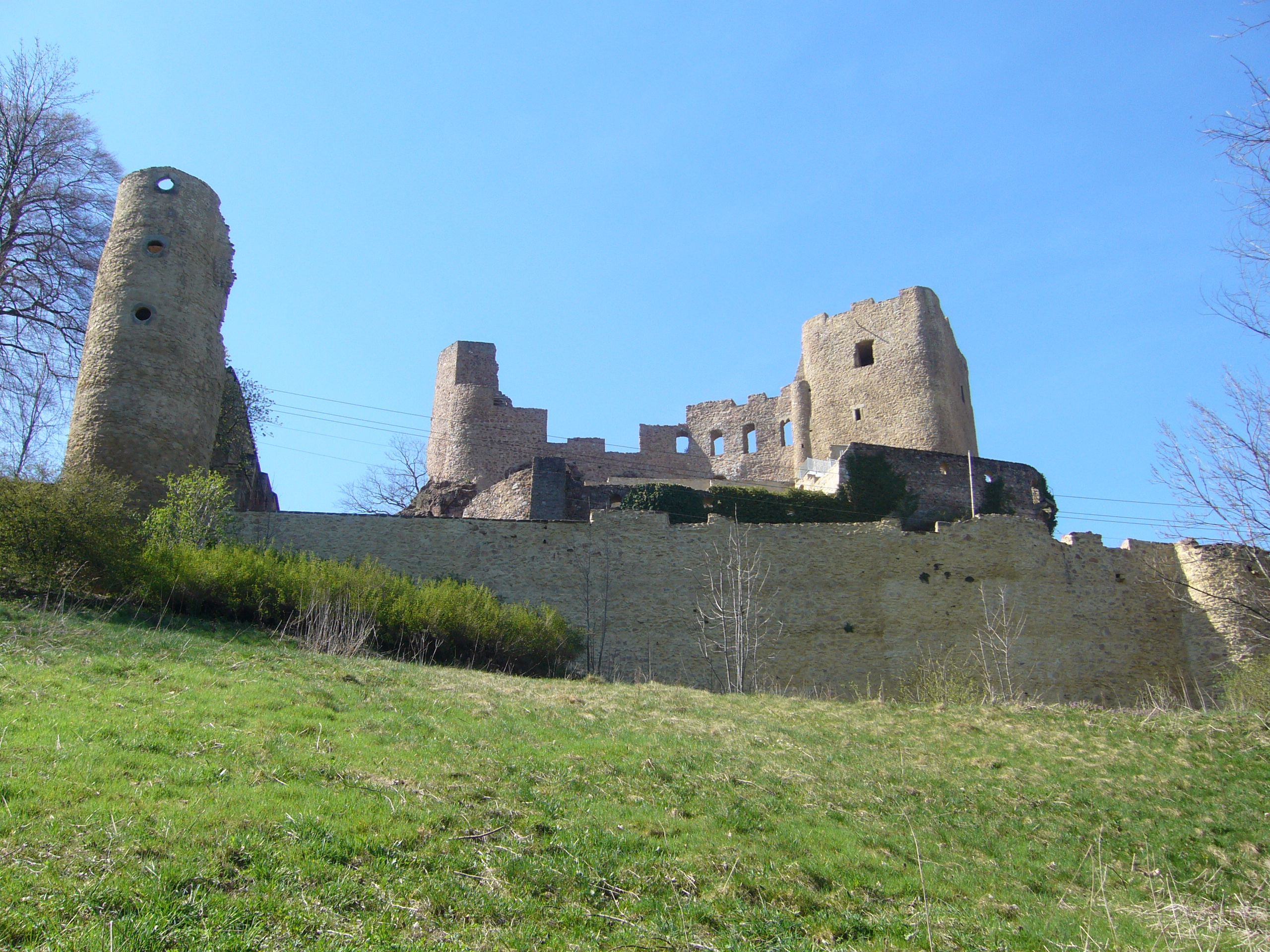
- The ruins of Frauenstein Castle

Site information
- Type: hill castle
- Code: DE-SN
- Condition: remains of tower and walls

Location
- Coordinates: 50°48′14″N 13°32′22″E
- Height: 680 m above sea level (NN)

Site history
- Built: around 1200

Garrison information
- Occupants: margraves, nobles

The ruins of Frauenstein Castle (German: Burg Frauenstein) are located on a 680-metre-high (2,230 ft) granite rock on the crest of the Eastern Ore Mountains near the town of Frauenstein in the district of Mittelsachsen.

== History ==
The castle, which was first recorded by name in 1272, was built as a border fortification between the March of Meissen and Bohemia. It protected the trade routes and the silver mining industry. The original inner ward measured just 30 × 15 m and incorporated a tower house.

In the period that followed a second tower house was erected. This was linked to the existing tower. In the final years of the 13th century the great hall and castle chapel were built. The construction of the great curtain wall was carried out in the first half of the 14th century. The margrave enfeoffed the castle in 1329 together with its dominion to the burgraves of Meissen.

The parish of Frauenstein was granted town rights in 1411. In 1438 the Wettins largely destroyed the castle during a siege. The Margrave of Meissen then disputed the succession rights of the burgraves. The dispute had started when the Meinheringer line died out in 1426 and was taken over by the Vögte from the House of Plauen. The nobility of that house, the von Schönbergs, were given the castle in 1473. They had a palace (Schloss) built in the years 1585–1588 designed by the architect to the Elector, Hans Irmisch. On the completion of the palace, the castle remained unoccupied. Nevertheless, the chapel was renovated in 1615.

The last Schönberg at Frauenstein sold his estate in 1647 to the prince-elector, John George I. The palaces was converted, first to a judicial office (Gerichtsamt) and later into a forestry office (Forstrentamt) and district court (Amtsgericht).

In 1728 a fire destroyed a large part of the town of Frauenstein and affected both the castle and the palace very badly. Because the castle, unlike the palace, was not being used, it was not rebuilt.

Today the 13th-century tower house, known as Dicker Merten and the 1 1/2-metre-thick (4.9 ft) curtain wall remain standing. The remaining rooms include the cellar, kitchen, castle chapel, prison, two parlours and several vaults. Restoration work was carried out on the ruins in 1968, 1990 and 1992.

In 2007 an interest group was founded with the aim of keeping the castle accessible to the public and preventing it falling into private hands. From this group, the Society for the Preservation of Frauenstein Castle (Förderverein Burg Frauenstein e.V.) was founded in 2009.
