= Statz Friedrich von Fullen =

Polish–Lithuanian nobleman

Statz Friedrich von Fullen (6 March 1638 – 20 July 1703) was a nobleman and a Geheimrat of war for the Polish–Lithuanian Commonwealth and the Electorate of Saxony.

== Life ==
Statz Friedrich von Fullen was born in Eystrup to a noble family of Westphalian origin, which moved to Lüneburg. Here, in Eystrup (or Eißdorff), Statz Friedrich von Fullen was born to Friedrich von Fullen (1592–1663) and his wife Margareta Sophia von Münchhausen.

On 20 June 1660, von Fullen married Anna Catharina von Anckelmann, a widow who was seven years his senior. She owned the manor of Markkleeberg and was therefore resident in Saxony. He entered the Saxon military and served under four Prince-Electors (John George II, John George III, John George IV, and Augustus the Strong) and worked his way up to the rank of Geheimrat of the council of war. In addition, he was assessor at the Oberhofgericht for Leipzig, and Ober-Land-Commissar. In 1675 he acquired Störmthal manor. In 1690, he managed to detach Störmthal from the parish of Magdeborn. To achieve this, a process was necessary, over which the Elector's court in Dresden had ultimate jurisdiction. Störmthal was raised to the rank of mother church with the filial churches of Dreiskau-Muckern and Pötzschau. At his initiative, Störmthal's first school was opened in 1691. In 1693, he had a manor house with many large farm buildings built here and planted a large garden. The manor, with its garden, farm, seven fish ponds and a healing fountain, became a popular excursion for the citizens of Leipzig.

Anna Catharina, von Fullen's wife, died in 1682. She had borne four children, three of which died young. His son, Statz Friedrich (1666–1704) was a major in Prince Lubomirski's cuirasser-regiment in the Saxon Army. In 1683, Statz Friedrich married Anna Dorothea von Seidlitz, who outlived him by twelve years. He had three daughters with her, who died in childhood, and a son, Statz Hilmar von Fullen (born 1691) who inherited Markkleeberg and Störmthal and acquired Liebertwolkwitz. He was a Polish and Saxon chamberlain and Ordinarius-Assessor of the Oberhofgericht of Leipzig.

Statz Friedrich von Fullen died in Dehlitz.
