= Höchsterwünschtes Freudenfest, BWV 194 =

Church cantata by J. S. Bach

Höchsterwünschtes Freudenfest
- BWV 194
- Sacred cantata by J. S. Bach
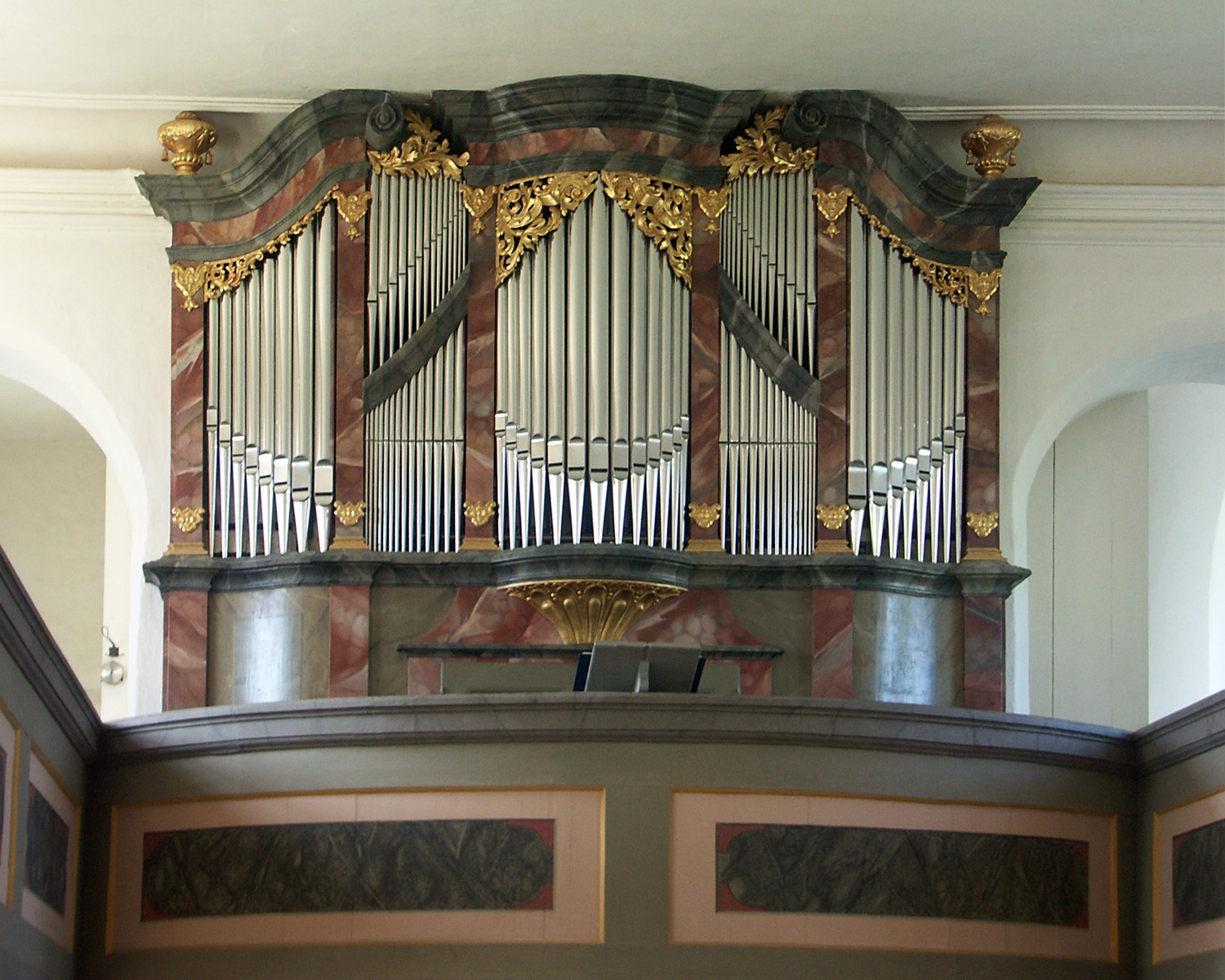
- The organ at Störmthal, where the cantata was first performed
- Related: based on BWV 194a
- Occasion: Inauguration of church and organ
- Chorale: "Treuer Gott, ich muß dir klagen" by Johann Heermann; "Wach auf, mein Herz, und singe" by Paul Gerhardt
- Performed: 2 November 1723: Störmthal
- Movements: 6
- Vocal: SATB choir; soprano, tenor and bass soloists
- Instrumental: 3 oboes; bassoon; 2 violins; viola; continuo

Höchsterwünschtes Freudenfest (Most highly desired festival of joy), BWV 194, (Note: "BWV" is Bach-Werke-Verzeichnis, a thematic catalogue of Bach's works.) is a church cantata by Johann Sebastian Bach. He composed it in Leipzig for dedication of the church and organ at Störmthal on 2 November 1723.

The cantata text was written by an anonymous poet, including two stanzas of Johann Heermann's hymn "Treuer Gott, ich muß dir klagen" (1630) and two stanzas of Paul Gerhardt's "Wach auf, mein Herz, und singe" (1647). Bach used an earlier secular cantata as a base for a structure in two parts of six movements each, beginning with an extended choral movement and concluding both parts with chorale stanzas. The inner movements are alternating recitatives and arias. The chorales are the only movements which were certainly newly composed for the occasion. Bach scored the work for three vocal soloists, a four-part choir and a Baroque instrumental ensemble of three oboes, bassoon, strings and continuo. After the first performance in Störmthal, Bach performed the cantata again in Leipzig for Trinity Sunday, first on 4 June 1724, a shortened version in 1726, and the complete version in 1731.

== History and text ==
The first known performance of the cantata was at Störmthal, a village near Leipzig. The church there had been rebuilt, and a new organ been built on a commission by Statz Friedrich von Fullen. The organ was an early work by Zacharias Hildebrandt. Von Fullen requested an approval of the instrument from Johann Sebastian Bach, who was then Thomaskantor in Leipzig. Bach was satisfied and composed this cantata for the dedication service for the church and the organ on 2 November 1723. The text deals with the inauguration of the church. The organ has no solo function in the cantata.

The cantata text was written by an anonymous poet, who took Solomon's prayer for the dedication of the temple as a starting point to reflect the church as the house of God. Frequent Biblical references throughout the text suggest that the author was a theologian. He included as movement 6, ending Part I, stanzas 6 and 7 of Johann Heermann's hymn "Treuer Gott, ich muß dir klagen" (1630), and as the closing chorale, stanzas 9 and 10 of Paul Gerhardt's "Wach auf, mein Herz, und singe" (1647).

Scholars such as John Eliot Gardiner assume that Bach based the cantata on a lost work (BWV 194a), probably composed at Köthen for an unknown occasion. The music of movements 2, 4, 6, 7, 8 and 10 is lost, and only instrumental parts of the other movements are extant. Bach added the chorales for the 1723 dedication service. Höchsterwünschtes Freudenfest shows musical similarities also to Preise, Jerusalem, den Herrn, BWV 119, written for the inauguration of the Leipzig town council a few weeks earlier.

Bach led the first performance at the dedication service in Störmthal. The printed text mentions Bach as "Hochfürstl. Anhalt-Cöthenischen Capell-Meister, auch Directore Chori musici Lipsiensis" (Kapellmeister to the Prince of Anhalt-Köthen and Director of the Choir at Leipzig), referring to his appointments in the service of Leopold, Prince of Anhalt-Köthen. The organ of Störmthal is notable as one of few such instruments still mostly unaltered since Bach's time. A restorer in 1934 remarked that it was tuned about a whole tone lower than 440, which may account for the unusually high vocal ranges. Bach demanded "top Cs" from the sopranos, which is unique in his sacred cantatas. The organ part prepared for the Leipzig revival is notated a minor third lower than the other instruments.

Bach revived the cantata for performances in Leipzig for Trinity Sunday. The prescribed readings for Trinity were Romans 11:33–36, and John 3:1–15, the meeting of Jesus and Nicodemus. The general topic and even an "invocation of the Trinity" in movement 6 made for an easy transition. On 4 June 1724, Bach concluded his first cantata cycle with this work. On 16 June 1726, he presented a shortened version, with movements appearing in the order 12, 2, 3, 4, 5, 7, 10. The 12-movement version was again performed on 20 May 1731.

== Structure and scoring ==
Bach structured the cantata in two parts of six movements each. It is scored for three vocal soloists (soprano (S), tenor (T) and bass (B)), a four-part choir (SATB), and a Baroque instrumental ensemble of three oboes (Ob), bassoon (Fg), two violins (Vl), viola (Va) and basso continuo.

In the following table of the movements, the scoring follows the Neue Bach-Ausgabe. The keys and time signatures are taken from the Bach scholar Alfred Dürr, using the symbol for common time (4/4). The instruments are shown separately for winds and strings, while the continuo, playing throughout, is not shown.

Movements of Höchsterwünschtes Freudenfest
| No. | Title | Text | Type | Vocal | Winds | Strings | Key | Time |
|---|---|---|---|---|---|---|---|---|
| 1 | Höchsterwünschtes Freudenfest | anon. | Chorus | SATB | 3Ob Fg | 2Vl Va | B♭ major | 3/4 |
| 2 | Unendlich großer Gott, ach wende dich | anon. | Recitative | B | | | | common time |
| 3 | Was des Höchsten Glanz erfüllt | anon. | Aria | B | Ob | 2Vl Va | B♭ major | 12/8 |
| 4 | Wie könnte dir, du höchstes Angesicht | anon. | Recitative | S | | | | common time |
| 5 | Hilf, Gott, dass es uns gelingt | anon. | Aria | S | | 2Vl Va | E♭ major | common time |
| 6 | Heilger Geist ins Himmels Throne | Heermann | Chorale | SATB | 3Ob | 2Vl Va | B♭ major | common time |
| 7 | Ihr Heiligen, erfreuet euch | anon. | Recitative | T | | | | common time |
| 8 | Des Höchsten Gegenwart allein | anon. | Aria | T | | | G minor | common time |
| 9 | Kann wohl ein Mensch zu Gott im Himmel steigen | anon. | Recitative (Duetto) | S B | | | | common time |
| 10 | O wie wohl ist uns geschehn | anon. | Aria (Duetto) | S B | 2Ob | | F major | 3/4 |
| 11 | Wohlan demnach, du heilige Gemeine | anon. | Recitative | B | | | | common time |
| 12 | Sprich Ja zu meinen Taten | Paul Gerhardt | Chorale | SATB | 3Ob | 2Vl Va | B♭ major | 3/4 |

== Music ==
The music has an often dance-like character. All recitatives, the majority of the solo movements, are secco, accompanied only by the continuo. Most of them are followed by an aria performed by the same voice type.

Part I begins with a chorus in the style of a French overture with a solemn opening and a fast fugal central section. The bass sings a recitative and an aria, accompanied by solo oboe and strings. The soprano sings a modulating recitative and an aria in the style of a gavotte. A four-part harmonization of the chorale ends the first part.

Part II begins with the tenor singing a recitative and a da capo aria in a minor mode, characterized by its extensive use of dotted rhythms. A dialogue recitative for bass and soprano leads to a duet aria with oboes and continuo. After a declamatory bass recitative, the work ends with another four-part chorale setting.

== Recordings ==
The entries are taken from the listing on the Bach Cantatas Website. Ensembles with period instruments in historically informed performance are marked by green background.

Recordings of Höchsterwünschtes Freudenfest
| Title | Conductor / Choir / Orchestra | Soloists | Label | Year | Orch. type |
|---|---|---|---|---|---|
| Die Bach Kantate Vol. 65 | Helmuth Rilling Gächinger Kantorei Bach-Collegium Stuttgart | Judith Beckmann; Adalbert Kraus; Walter Heldwein | Hänssler | 1977 | |
| J. S. Bach: Das Kantatenwerk (Complete Cantatas). Folge / Vol. 44 - BWV 192, 194-195 | Nikolaus Harnoncourt Tölzer Knabenchor Concentus Musicus Wien | Hans Stricker, Stefan Gienger (of the Tölzer Knabenchor); Kurt Equiluz; Thomas Hampson | Teldec | 1997 | Period |
| J. S. Bach: Complete Cantatas Vol. 9 | Ton Koopman Amsterdam Baroque Orchestra & Choir | Sibylla Rubens; Christoph Prégardien; Klaus Mertens | Erato | 1998 | Period |
| Bach Edition Vol. 15 – Cantatas Vol. 8 | Pieter Jan Leusink Holland Boys Choir Netherlands Bach Collegium | Ruth Holton; Nico van der Meel; Knut Schoch; Bas Ramselaar | Brilliant Classics | 2000 | Period |
| Bach Cantatas Vol. 27: Blythburgh/Kirkwall / For Whit Tuesday / For Trinity Sunday | John Eliot Gardiner Monteverdi Choir English Baroque Soloists | Ruth Holton; Paul Agnew; Peter Harvey | Soli Deo Gloria | 2000 | Period |
| J. S. Bach: Cantatas Vol. 16 - Cantatas from Leipzig 1723 - BWV 119, 194 | Masaaki Suzuki Bach Collegium Japan | Yukari Nonoshita; Makoto Sakurada; Jochen Kupfer | BIS | 2000 | Period |

== Sources ==
- Literature by and about Höchsterwünschtes Freudenfest, BWV 194 in the German National Library catalogue
- Höchsterwünschtes Freudenfest, BWV 194: Scores at the International Music Score Library Project
- Höchsterwünschtes Freudenfest (Störmthal version) BWV 194; BC B 31 / Sacred cantata (Consecration of church and organ) Bach Digital
- fragment BWV 194a; BC (G 11) / Secular cantata (unknown purpose) Bach Digital
- Höchsterwünschtes Freudenfest (1st Leipzig version) BWV 194; BC A 91a / Sacred cantata (Trinity Sunday) Bach Digital
- (Nun lasst uns Gott, dem Herren?) (2nd Leipzig version) title not clear BWV 194; BC A 91b / Sacred cantata (Trinity Sunday) Bach Digital
- BWV 194 Höchsterwünschtes Freudenfest: English translation, University of Vermont
- Gardiner, John Eliot (2008). Johann Sebastian Bach (1685-1750) / Cantatas Nos 129, 165, 175, 176, 184 & 194 (Media notes). Soli Deo Gloria (at Hyperion Records website).
- Luke Dahn: BWV 194.6 bach-chorales.com
- Luke Dahn: BWV 194.12 bach-chorales.com
