= Schaukelgraben =

River in Germany

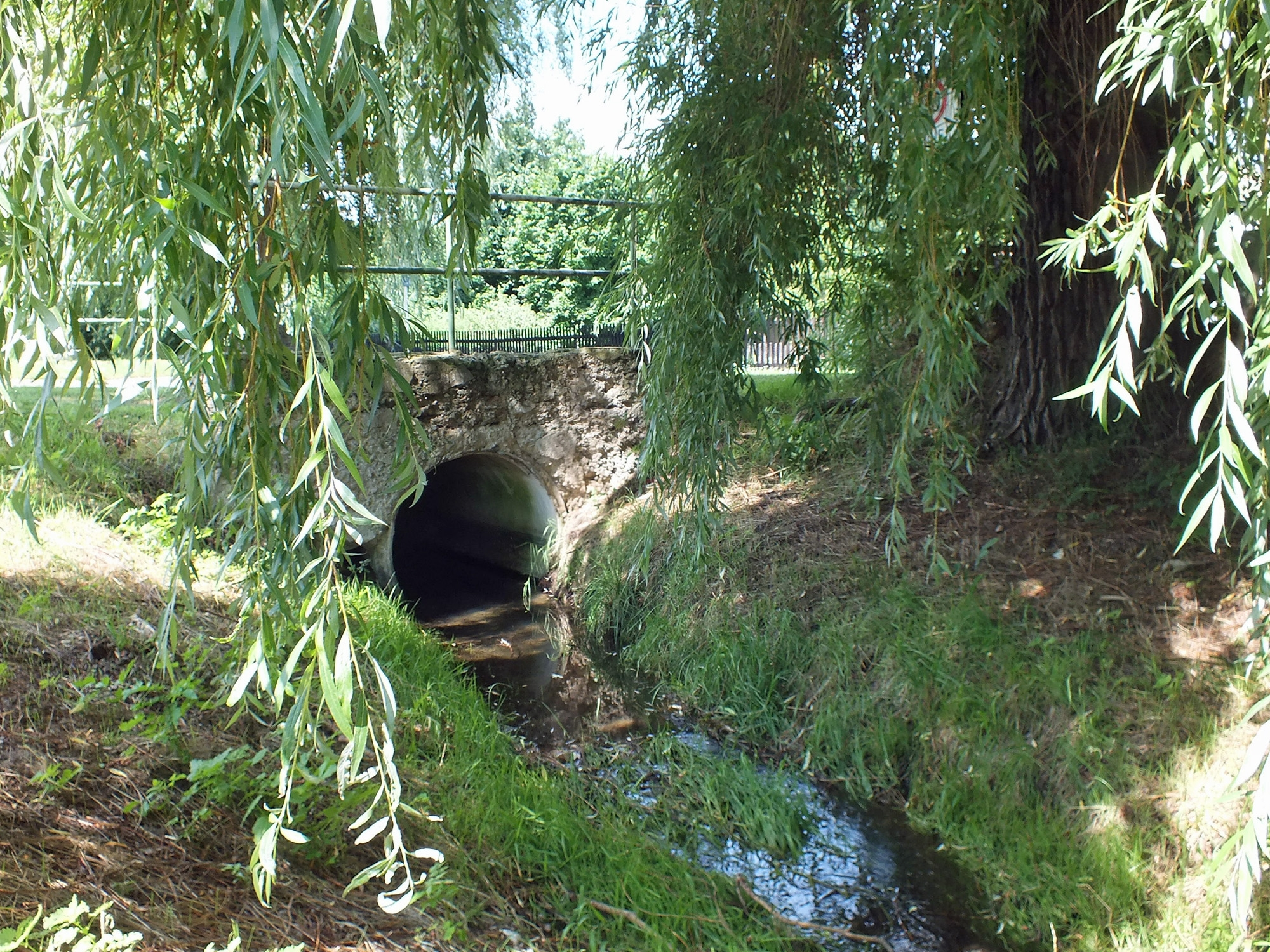
- The exit to the underground passage of the Schaukelgraben below the road and railway line in Liebertwolkwitz

Location
- Country: Germany
- State: Saxony
- City: Leipzig

Physical characteristics
- Source
  - location: south of Liebertwolkwitz
  - coordinates: 51°15′48″N 12°27′33″E
  - elevation: 152 m
- Mouth
  - location: east of Liebertwolkwitz
  - coordinates: 51°17′05″N 12°29′23″E
  - elevation: 136 m
- Length: 3.46 km (2.15 mi)

Basin features
- Progression: Pösgraben→ Threne→ Parthe→ White Elster→ Saale→ Elbe→ North Sea

The Schaukelgraben is a stream in Saxony, Germany. It flows into the Pösgraben near Liebertwolkwitz.

== See also ==
- List of rivers of Saxony
