= Gustav Jäger =

Gustav Jäger may refer to:

- Gustav Jäger (painter) (1808–1871), German painter
- Gustav Jäger (naturalist) (1832–1917), German naturalist and hygienist
