= Leipzig–Geithain railway =

Railway line in Germany

Leipzig Hbf–Geithain railway
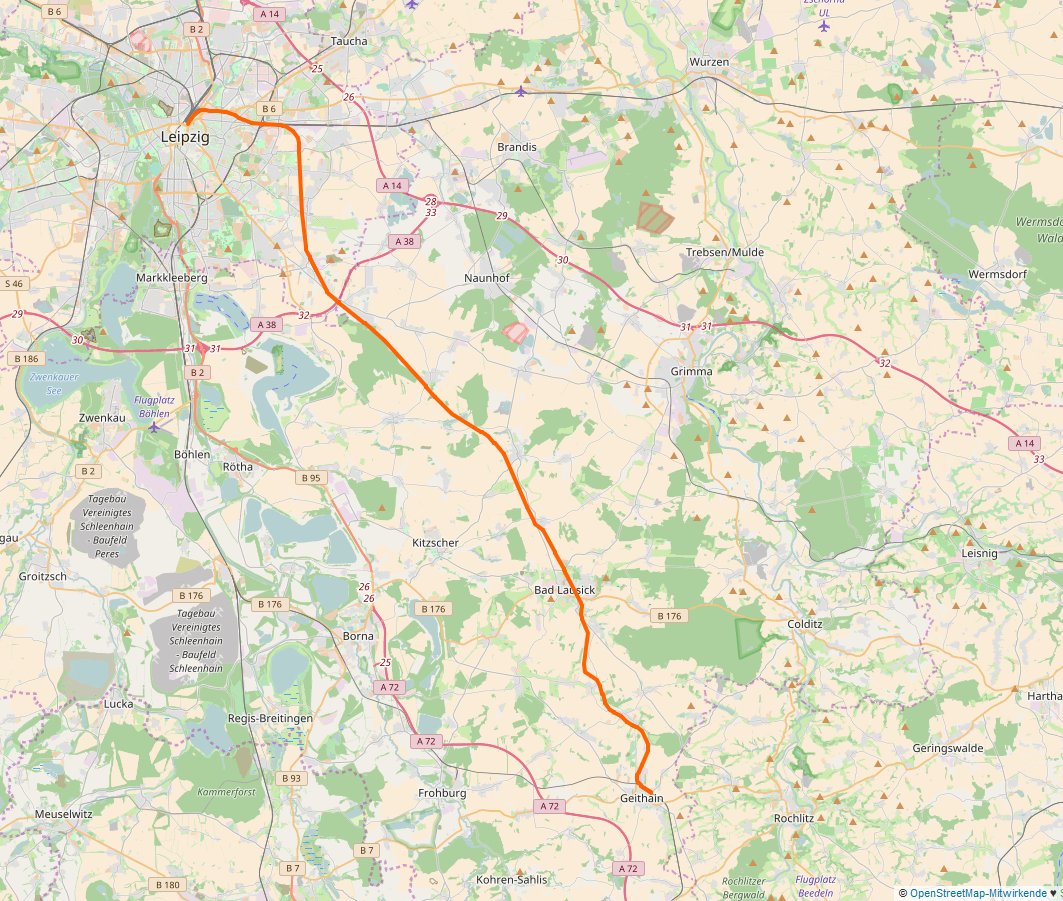

Overview
- Line number: 6366
- Locale: Saxony, Germany

Service
- Route number: 525

Technical
- Line length: 44.007 km (27.345 mi)
- Number of tracks: 2: L.-Paunsdorf–Leipzig Werkstättenstraße
- Track gauge: 1,435 mm (4 ft 8 1/2 in) standard gauge
- Minimum radius: 300 m (980 ft)
- Operating speed: 160 km/h (99.4 mph) (maximum)
- Maximum incline: 10.5%

The Leipzig–Geithain railway is a main line in the German state of Saxony. It runs from Leipzig via Bad Lausick to Geithain. It is part of a long-distance railway from Leipzig to Chemnitz. The line is not electrified and is essentially single track. The only section of double-track is an about 900 m-long section between the Leipzig-Paunsdorf crossover and Leipzig Werkstättenstraße.

== History ==
Leipzig had a railway connection since the end of the 1830s and [Chemnitz] was connected to the railway network at the beginning of the 1850s, but a long detour via Riesa was necessary for traffic running between the two cities. Therefore, in the 1850s, the first railway committees were formed, calling for the construction of a line from Leipzig to Chemnitz. In addition to the industrial Mulde valley, other towns such as Borna, Burgstädt, Lausigk (Bad Lausick) and Limbach would have benefited from the line. Each committee presented its own proposal for a route, which would have benefited its own location as much as possible. As the Borsdorf–Grimma section of the Borsdorf–Coswig railway was opened in 1866, a railway connection to the area south of Leipzig became more and more urgent as many companies moved their production to the new line. The Leipzig–Lausigk–Rochlitz stagecoach service had also been closed. That led to vehement demands for a Leipzig–Geithain–Chemnitz railway. However, the Saxon government showed little interest in this new rail connection, while the city of Borna built a short branch line to the Leipzig–Hof railway at its own expense. This line was opened in 1867. The Kieritzsch–Borna line was extended to Chemnitz in 1872, but also proposed direct Leipzig–Chemnitz connections from Leipzig via Lausigk and/or Grimma were not implemented. The opening of the Glauchau–Wurzen railway between 1875 and 1877 further delayed the building of a railway through the area around Lausigk.

The railway committee of Lausigk did not give up and sent further submissions to the Saxon Landtag (parliament). Of course, the proposal was not very well received at first. On the one hand there were innumerable submissions from all over Saxony. On the other hand, the railway connections to the existing lines through the rather agricultural area around Lausigk were not profitable. The building of the line as a narrow-gauge line was considered, but decisively rejected by the affected area and by the Saxon Finance Minister Léonçe von Könneritz. It was only when Chemnitz and Leipzig supported an even shorter link between the two cities, that construction of a railway seemed realistic. The second chamber of the Landtag approved the route in 1883, but it still failed in the first chamber. It was only after a conciliation between the houses that railway construction was approved on 20 March 1884.

Initial preparations had begun before the final approval of the construction of the railway. The formal groundbreaking took place on 11 November 1885 in Liebertwolkwitz. The general route ran through level terrain and did not cause any problems for construction, but several very swampy places had to be crossed south of Liebertwolkwitz. The excavation work was carried out mainly by Bohemians and Poles, with the rest carried out by Italians. The long-lasting winter of 1885/86 brought the works to a complete standstill. Some already finished sections of the track were destroyed by heavy rain in the summer of 1886. The police examined the line on 26 April 1887 and no building defects were found. The ceremonial opening was held on 30 April 1887, attended by a large part of the population, and the opening train was hauled by a locomotive of type IIIb. Actual operations commenced on 2 May 1887.

In Leipzig, the line ended at the Dresdner Bahnhof (the terminus of the line to Dresden) in 1887, which had been extended for this purpose. With the reconstruction of the Leipzig stations and approaches in 1913, the terminus of the line was moved to the Hauptbahnhof. This resulted in an extension of the line by 270 metres.

=== Operations ===
At first, three pairs of trains ran over the line each day, while on Sundays there was a fourth.

Platform gates were installed at all stations in 1898. The line developed increasingly as the main line between Chemnitz and Leipzig, because among other things it was around 8 km was shorter than via Kieritzsch. It could also relieve the heavily used Leipzig–Altenburg section of the Leipzig–Hof railway. In order to increase capacity, the Leipzig–Liebertwolkwitz section was upgraded to two tracks from 1914 onwards. Operations using two tracks commenced in 1916. The construction of a second track to Belgershain at an estimated cost of about 800,000 Marks had already been approved in 1920, but this project was aborted because of a new cost estimates.

The line was largely undamaged by the Second World War. After the war, it was initially planned to dismantle the Liebertwolkwitz–Bad Lausick section of the line for reparations to the Soviet Union. As mining operations had already begun in Liebertwolkwitz, as a short-term measure, the Borna–Großbothen railway was dismantled instead of the Liebertwolkwitz–Bad Lausick section. The second tracks on the Engelsdorf Werkstätten–Liebertwolkwitz section was also dismantled in 1946. Since about 1970, many of the mechanical full-barrier level-crossing gates, in particular those on the open line, have been replaced by systems using train-operated half-barriers and stoplights. Most of the approach and several entrance signals were replaced by colour-light signals in the 1980s. In 1990, the tracks consisted entirely of a few sections of continuously welded rail on concrete sleepers.

In addition to a pair of goods trains in the 1980s, express and stopping passenger trains ran between Leipzig and Karl-Marx-Stadt and once a day to and from Cranzahl (now in Sehmatal) in the Ore Mountains (Erzgebirge), as well as a pair of night fast trains (D728/729) to and from Karl-Marx-Stadt–Rostock.

=== Since 1990 ===
Between June 2003 and December 2004, the Leipzig to Chemnitz via Bad Lausick line was modernised to increase the maximum speed to 160 km/h. More than €100 million were invested. This included the installation of an electronic interlocking of the Alcatel design in Geithain to control the section from Mölkau, while the section from Leipzig-Dresdener freight yard to Leipzig Werkstättenstraße is now controlled by the Leipzig Ost electronic control centre. The second track between Leipzig Hbf and Leipzig-Paunsdorf was reduced to a crossing loop in the Leipzig-Dresdener freight yard and all connections to the Engelsdorf freight yard and all other facilities previously used for freight transport were dismantled. All level crossing protection systems were replaced by those of the RBÜT type. Since the middle of the 1990s, the track infrastructure has been prepared for an increase in speeds. Missing bridges were also replaced during the track possession, although no consideration was given to restoring two tracks between Leipzig and Liebertwolkwitz.

== Outlook ==
After options for upgrading the rail infrastructure between Leipzig and Chemnitz on the Leipzig–Neukieritzsch–Borna–Geithain–Chemnitz route had been examined several times between 2008 and 2012 and the announcement of the beginning of the preliminary planning for the upgrade of the line via Borna, the state of Saxony and Deutsche Bahn signed a contract for the extension and electrification of the Chemnitz–Leipzig line in January 2013. Routes via both Bad Lausick and Borna were to be investigated. As a result of the preliminary investigation, the route via Bad Lausick (and thus the inclusion of the Leipzig–Geithain railway) was selected as the preferred option. The main advantages of this option were a travel time of 50 minutes and convenient connections for passengers to the other long-distance lines in Leipzig Hauptbahnhof. In July 2013, the State of Saxony and Deutsche Bahn signed a planning agreement for the further upgrade and the electrification of the Leipzig–Chemnitz railway. The Free State of Saxony provided funding of around €2.4 million for this purpose. The preliminary planning was completed in the summer of 2014 and presented to the public in August 2014. In addition to the electrification, the restoration of the second track on the Leipzig–Geithain railway is also planned between Leipzig Werkstättenstraße and Liebertwolkwitz as well as four selective measures to increase the speed of the line. This includes track laying near Lauterbach-Steinbach station and the accompanying replacement of a level crossing by a road overpass. According to media reports, commissioning is expected at the earliest after eight years. The State of Saxony intends to commission the other projects in a timely manner and to finance them on a pro rata basis. The project was nominated for the Federal Transport Plan (Bundesverkehrswegeplan) 2030.

== Rail services ==
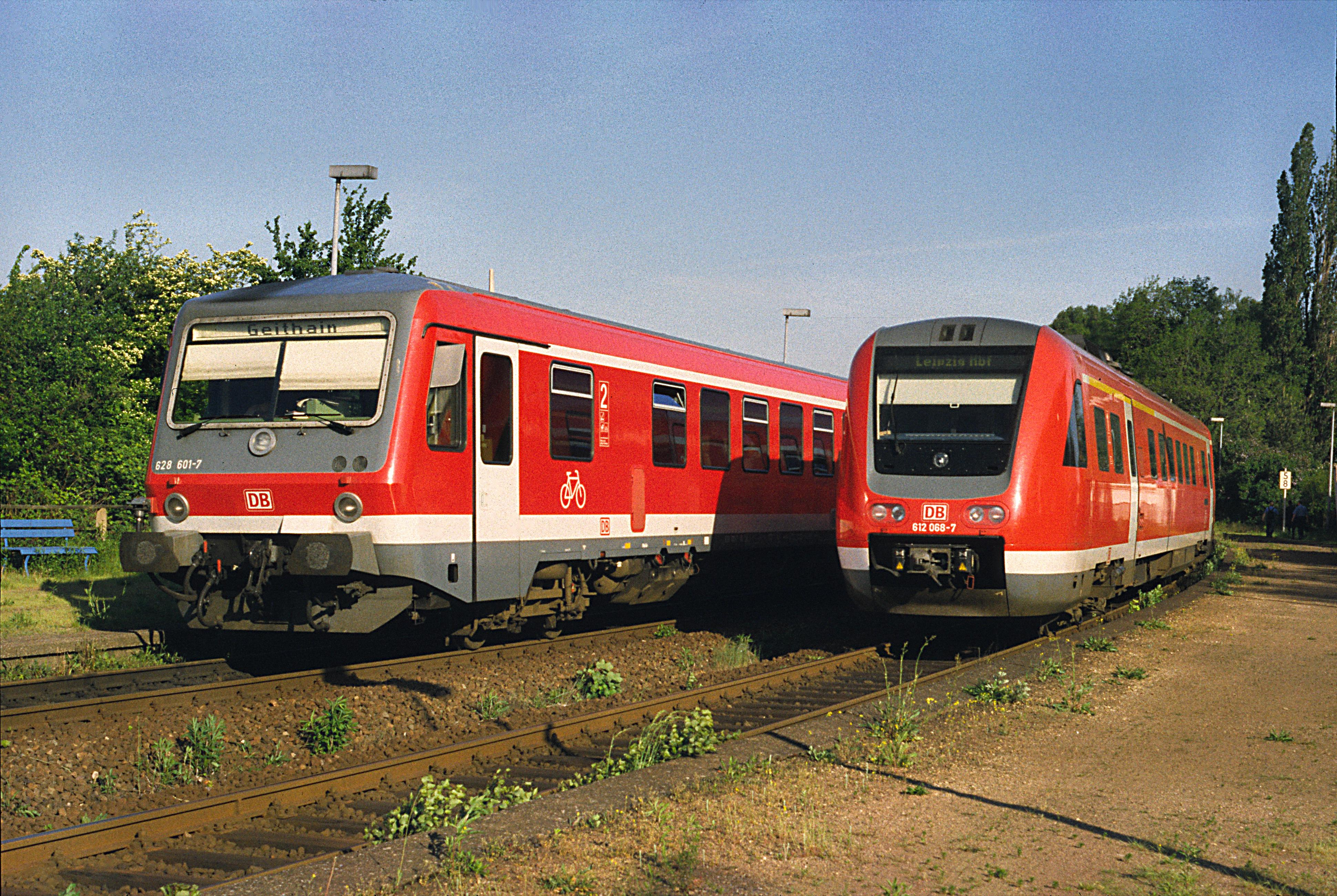
Trains crossing in Engelsdorf Werkstätten in 2000

The only services on the Leipzig–Geithain line are passenger services contracted and financed by the Zweckverband für den Nahverkehrsraum Leipzig (municipal association for local transport in the Leipzig area). With the Regional-Express RE 6 (Chemnitz-Leipzig-Express) (operated since the timetable change in December 2015 by Transdev Regio Ost (eastern region) under the marketing name of Mitteldeutsche Regiobahn (Central German Regional Railway)) there is an hourly, fast train service between Leipzig Hbf, Bad Lausick and Geithain. These trains continue to Chemnitz Hbf. This service is supplemented by stopping trains on the Leipzig–Bad Lausick route, which are extended to Geithain every two hours (operated since 12 June 2016 by DB Regio Südost, but operated previously for many years by Transdev Regio Ost).

== Route description ==
=== Course ===
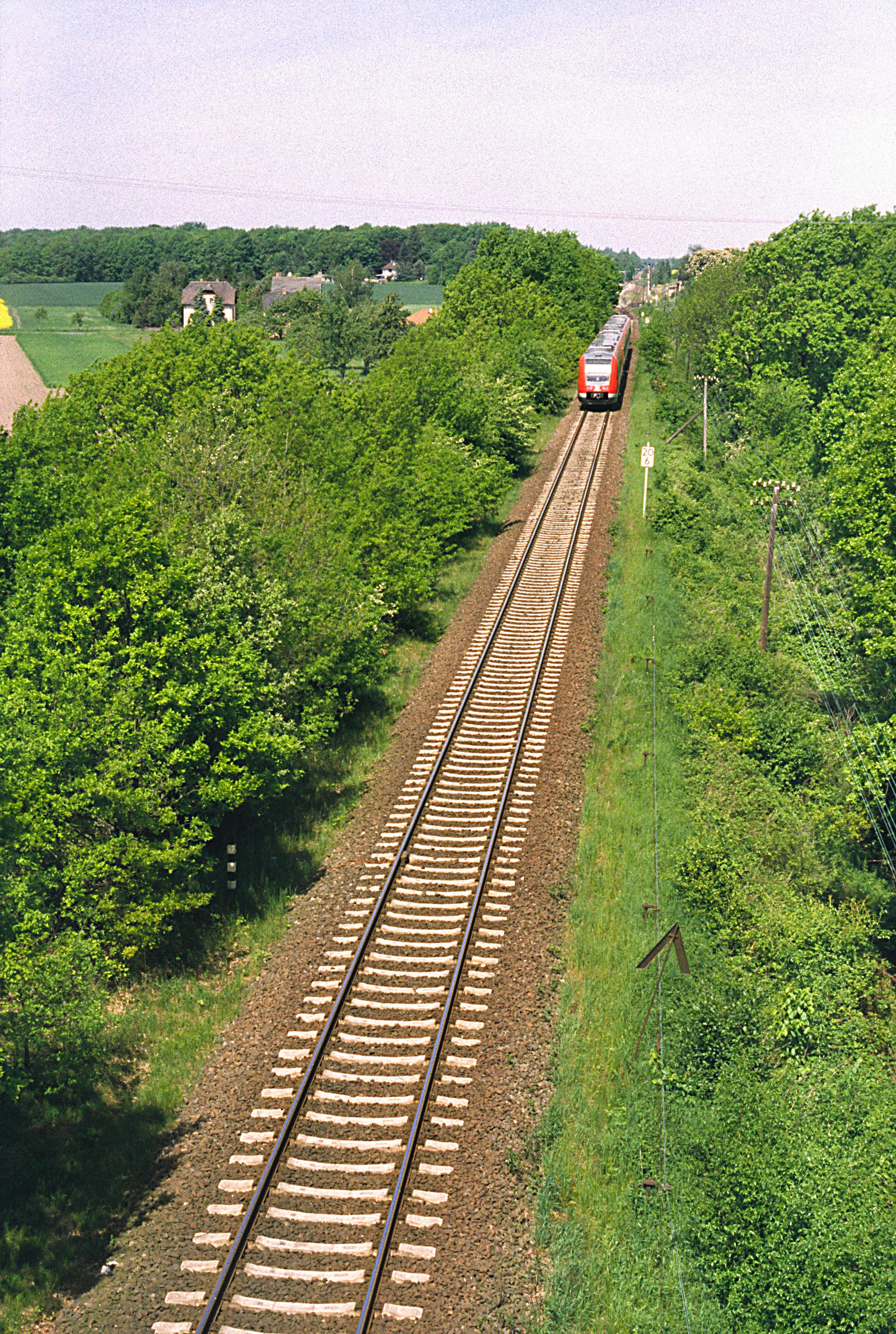
Line at Belgershain with diesel motor unit of class 612; long straight sections are typical of the first section of the line to Bad Lausick

The starting point of the line is at Leipzig Hauptbahnhof. The line initially runs to the east parallel with the Leipzig–Dresden railway. In the suburb of Stünz, the line turns to the south. From Liebertwolkwitz, the line runs south-east to Geithain station.

=== Stations ===
Leipzig Hbf (51°20′52″N 12°23′06″E)

After the building of Leipzig Hauptbahnhof from 1902 to 1915, the line now started at the new central station. Previously, the line started at Dresdner Bahnhof (Dresden line station).

Leipzig-Liebertwolkwitz station (51°17′01″N 12°28′10″E)

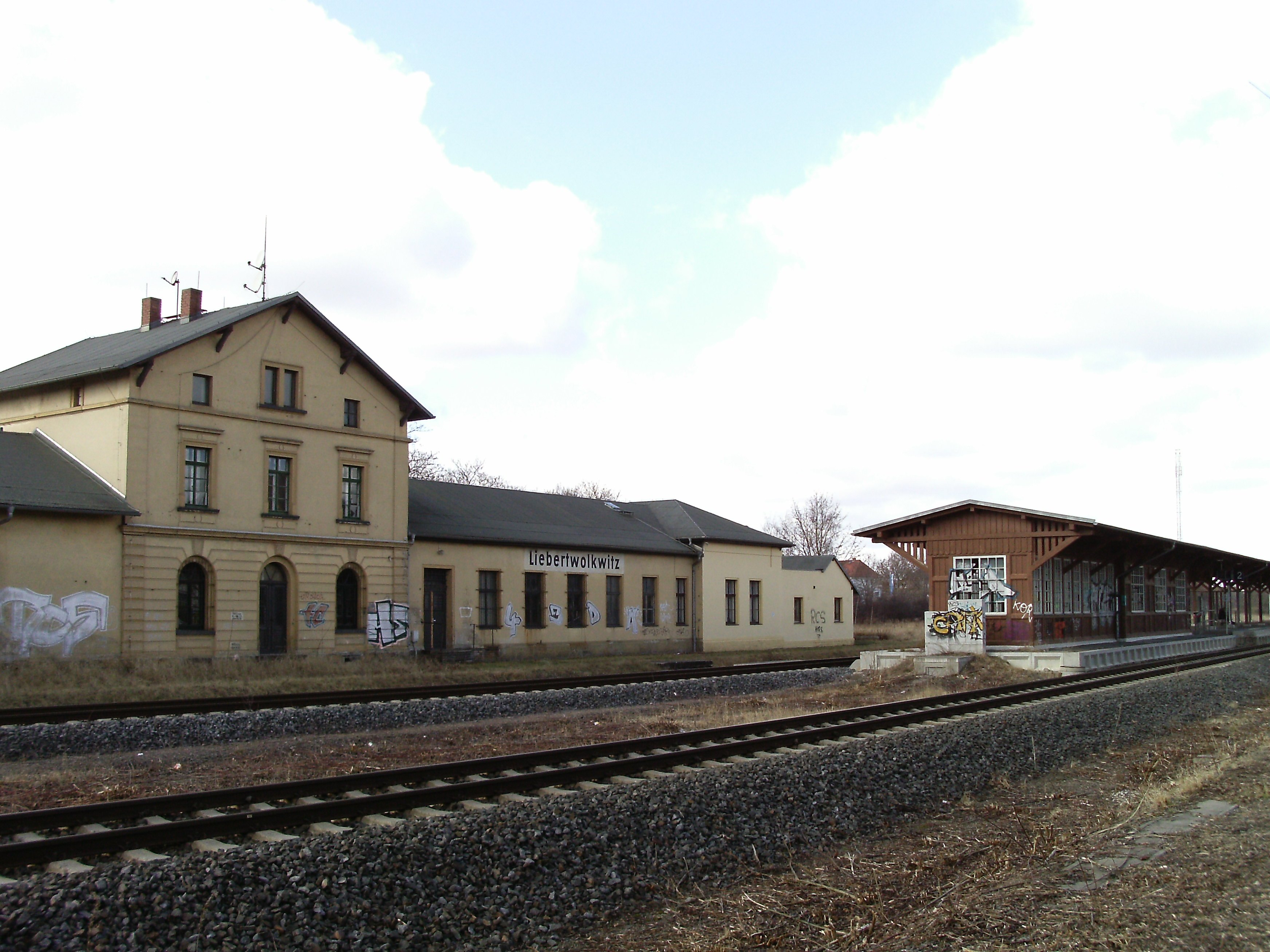
Entrance building with island platform

Leipzig-Liebertwolkwitz (called Liebertwolkwitz until 13 December 2003) was originally the most important intermediate station after Lausigk. Liebertwolkwitz was opened as a halt (Haltestelle) and reclassified as a station on 1 July 1898. Numerous industrial enterprises were located in the immediate vicinity of the station. The station had to be expanded several times. A Kleinlok (small locomotive) was stationed for the extensive freight traffic and a shed was built for it. From 1913 to 1946, the line from Leipzig to Liebertwolkwitz was double track and directional operation (the operation of trains running in different directions on different tracks, in this case on the right) through the station continued until its reconstruction in 2003. Some peak-hour trains ended here and had to make elaborate moves because of the directional operation. The buildings consisted of an entrance building, a goods shed, two mechanical signal boxes of the Bruchsal I design (which controlled, in addition to numerous sets of points, three mechanical full-barrier systems at level crossings), a signal and telecommunication workshop and an official residence. At one time, a Bahnmeisterei (track maintenance supervisor’s office) was also based there. Freight trains for local delivery and pick-up (Übergabezügen) also operated from Liebertwolkwitz to the former sidings at Holzhausen (Sachs) station that were closed in 1971.

With the political changes of 1989/90, the freight traffic drastically declined and the second track at the station was dismantled in two stages.

The "Lt" and "Ls" signal boxes were dismantled in 2003 and 2004.

Großpößna (51°16′00″N 12°29′20″E)

Although the municipality of Großpösna was already campaigning for a station during the construction of the railway, it was only opened on 8 October 1933. Previously, the railway had always directed the locals to Liebertwolkwitz station or later Oberholz. The facilities consist merely of a platform on the ground, which had been prepared for the construction of two tracks, (this was demolished in the 1920s) and a massive waiting room. The railway crossing, which was located directly at the station, has now been replaced by a road underpass slightly further north.

Belgershain (51°14′01″N 12°32′35″E)

Belgershain station was originally opened as a halt, but was reclassified as a station on 1 May 1905. Since numerous surrounding localities used the station, the station had to be expanded by 1900. A loading road, a freight shed and a side ramp were available for freight transport. The two-storey entrance building housed baggage handling and the ticket office as well as the main signal box "Bn". Guard signal box "Bw" and a railway residence were also built. In the 1930s, the town, which had only about 700 inhabitants, was served by long-distance services with several express trains passing through the station, which had three mainline tracks. The third mainline track was dismantled after the end of the war.

Even today, Belgershain still functions as a station where trains pass, although, in the course of work on the line in the 1990s, all remaining tracks were removed except for the two main tracks. The island platform on the main tracks was demolished with the 2003–2004 upgrade, thus only every second of the hourly trains could stop at Belgershain station. This unsatisfactory situation was only resolved in 2009 by the construction of a second external platform and a pedestrian bridge.

Bad Lausick (51°08′37″N 12°38′56″E)

At the start of operations, Lausigk station was the most important intermediate station on the railway line after Liebertwolkwitz. Initially equipped with five tracks, the station was soon expanded to cope with the increasing traffic. Lausigk developed into a health resort, as a result of its railway connection, among other things, although, until the end of the First World War, the express trains running along the line did not stop there.

As early as the beginning of the 1920s, it was planned to rebuild the station for the Borna–Großbothen railway. The line was not opened until 1937, but it was dismantled for reparations in 1947.

In the 2000s, the still remaining railway tracks were radically rebuilt, leaving only two tracks, but Bad Lausick still serves as a crossing station.

Hopfgarten (Sachs) (51°06′21″N 12°39′42″E)

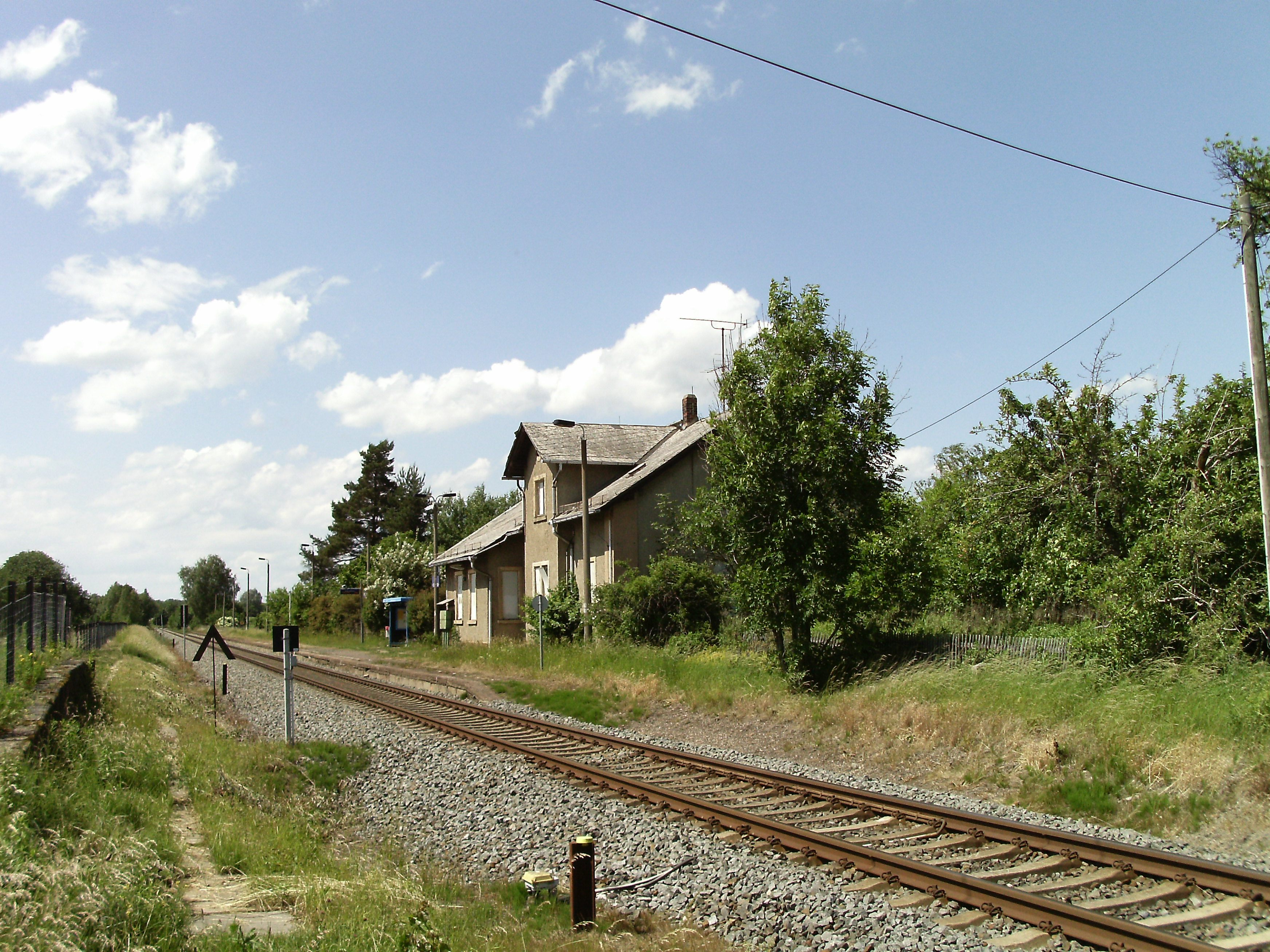
Hopfgarten station, to the right is the former entrance building, 2012

The station has had four different names during its operating period:

- originally: Hopfgarten
- until 30 June 1911: Hopfgarten i Sachsen
- until 21 December 1933: Hopfgarten (Sa)
- since 22 December 1933: Hopfgarten (Sachs)

At first Hopfgarten was only a halt, but on 1 May 1905 it was reclassified as a station. Apart from a loading track, there were almost no other facilities at the time. Hopfgarten station was expanded when a crossing loop between Bad Lausick and Geithain became necessary in about 1915 because of increased traffic. After the upgrade, Hopfgarten had three tracks with nine sets of points, an entrance building, a signal box and a freight shed. In addition there was a loading road and a loading ramp.

Hopfgarten was reclassified as a halt on 1 June 1987 and all the tracks were dismantled except the main track. The station was already practically unused for freight. Because of the need to control the sequence of trains to make the timetable work effectively, a block post (Blockstelle) was established in Hopfgarten in about 2010.

Tautenhain (51°05′24″N 12°40′44″E)

Like Hopfgarten, Tautenhain was originally only a halt. Tautenhain was reclassified as a station on 1 May 1905, but was again reduced to a halt on 1 September 1933. The only track at the halt is now the main railway line. The entrance building and the goods shed still exist.

Geithain (51°03′30″N 12°41′50″E)

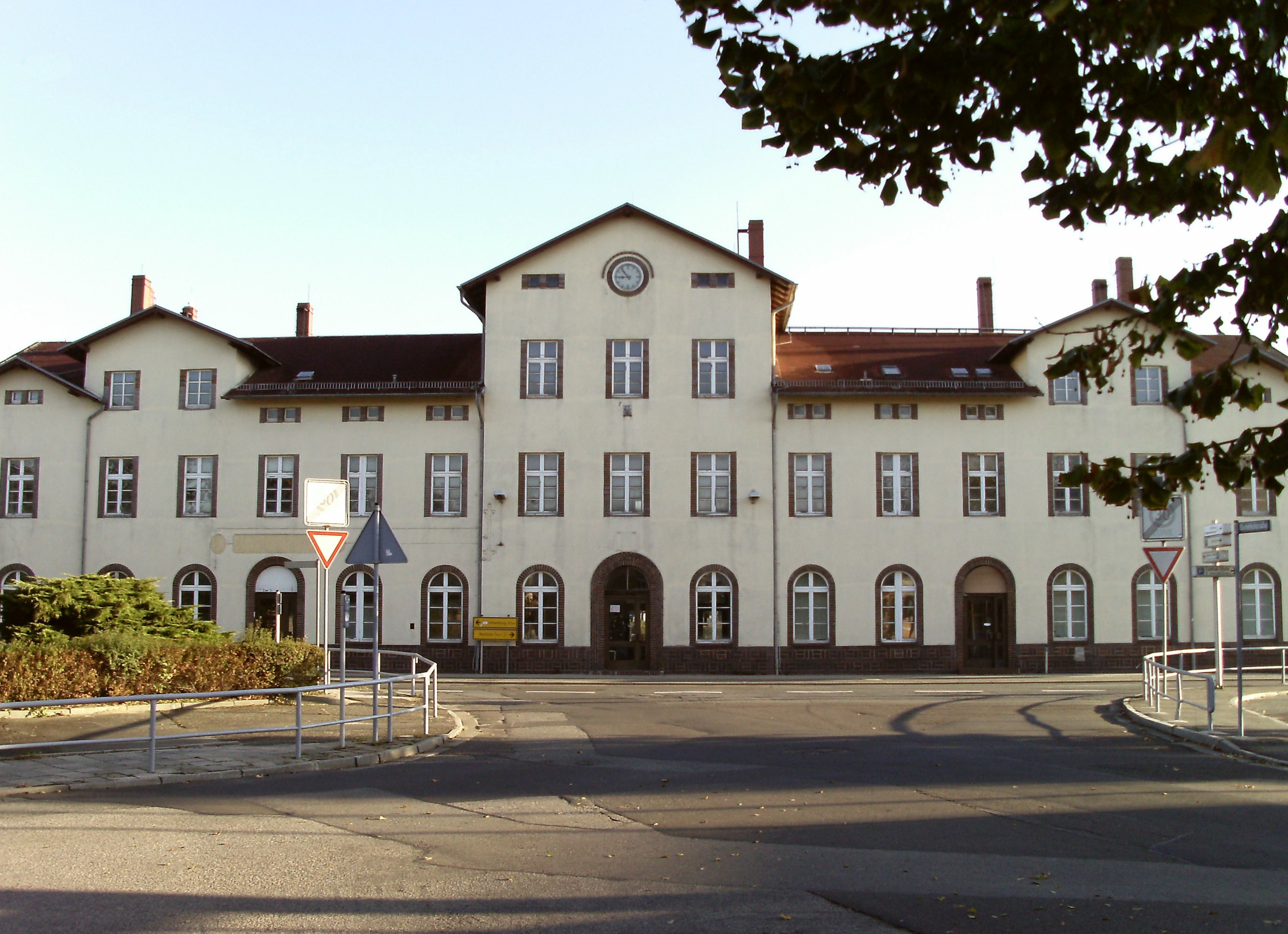
Entrance building of Geithain station, 2011

Originally only a transit station on the Kieritzsch–Chemnitz line, Geithain station was completely rebuilt before the opening of the Leipzig–Geithain railway. In addition, a locomotive depot was built. Geithain also became of great importance in freight transport since large quantities of building materials from nearby brickworks and quarries have been loaded at the station since the end of the 19th century.

The present appearance was given to the station from 2002 onwards, as large parts of the station were reconstructed with the upgrade of the Leipzig–Chemnitz line. The electronic control centre at Geithain, which was built by Thales, has controlled the whole line from Mölkau since December 2004 and also the Neukieritzsch–Chemnitz railway between Frohburg and Wittgensdorf Mitte and the Borsdorf–Coswig railway between Naunhof and Leisnig, which is part of the central Saxony regional network (Regionalnetz Mittelsachsen).
