= Johann Gottfried Hildebrandt =

German organ builder (died 1775)

Johann Gottfried Hildebrandt (1724 or 1725, in Störmthal – 7 November 1775, in Dresden) was a German organ builder.

Like his father, the important organ builder Zacharias Hildebrandt, Johann Gottfried was a Saxon organ builder in the second half of the eighteenth century. From 26 November 1771, he was the official organ builder to the Elector of Saxony.

He married Johanna Regina Hartmann in Leipzig on 26 February 1754.

== Organs ==
- 1743–46: Wenzelskirche in Naumburg (jointly with his father)
- 1750–55: Catholic Church of the Royal Court of Saxony in Dresden (collaboration)
- 1754–57: Dreikönigskirche in Dresden-Neustadt
- 1761–70: St. Michael's Church in Hamburg
- 1773–75: Sacred Heart Church in Sorau

== Bibliography ==
- Ulrich Dähnert: Historische Orgeln in Sachsen. Ein Orgelinventar. Deutscher Verlag für Musik, Leipzig 1983
- Ulrich Dähnert (1972). "Hildebrandt, Zacharias". Neue Deutsche Biographie (in German). Vol. 9. Berlin: Duncker & Humblot. pp. 130–130. (full text online).
