= Dreiskau-Muckern =

- Ortsteil of Großpösna
- Interactive map of Dreiskau-Muckern
- Location within Germany Location within Saxony
- Coordinates: 51°13′1″N 12°27′54″E
- Country: Germany
- State: Saxony
- Municipality: Großpösna
- Elevation: 127–134 m (417–440 ft)

Population (2014-12-31)
  - Total: 469
- Time zone: UTC+01:00 (CET)
  - Summer (DST): UTC+02:00 (CEST)
- Postal codes: 04463
- Dialling codes: 034206

Dreiskau-Muckern is an Ortsteil (division) of the municipality Großpösna in the Landkreis Leipzig in Saxony, Germany. It was formed in 1957 from the former municipalities Dreiskau and Muckern, and became part of Großpösna in 1997.

== History ==
The two villages were separate until the mid of the 20th century.

Dreiskau was first mentioned in 1317, as Trizko. The Catholic parish Dreiskau was part of the Diocese of Merseburg. The Protestant parish belonged until 1690 to Magdeborn, then to Störmthal. The church was built from 1740 to 1741. From 1952 Dreiskau is part of the Borna district.

Muckern was first mentioned in 1433, as Mockeryn in a document kept in the Domarchiv Merseburg. It belonged to the Rittergut of the noble family Zehmen.
