= Gustav Jäger (painter) =

German painter

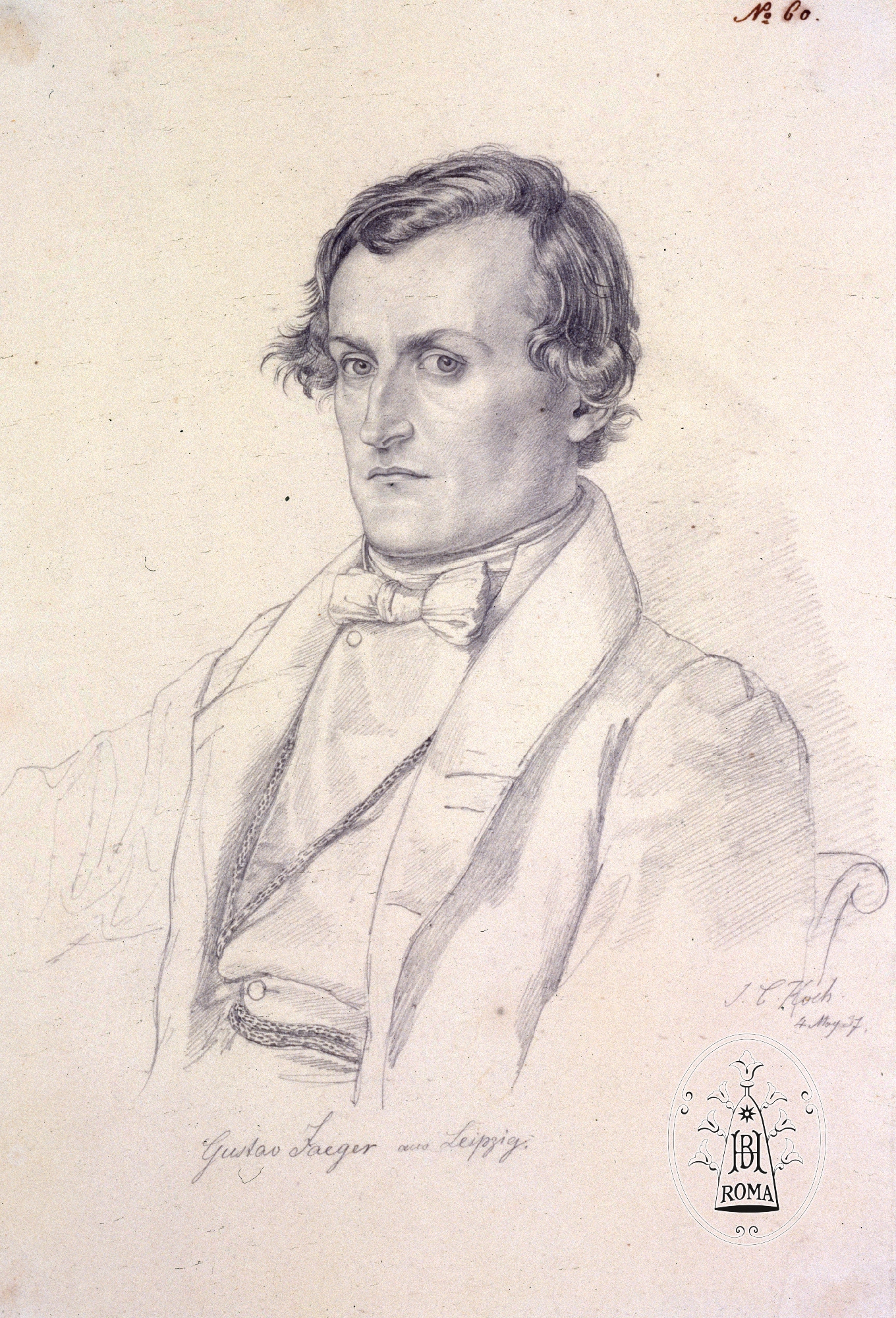
- Born: 12 July 1808; Leipzig
- Died: 19 April 1871 (aged 62); Leipzig

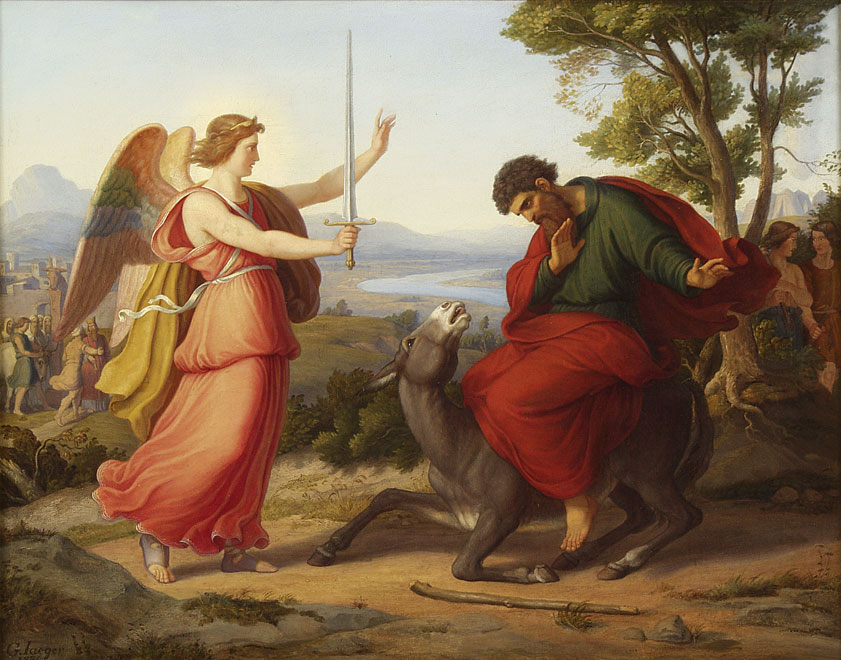
Balaam and the angel by Gustav Jaeger, 1836.

Gustav Jäger (12 July 1808 in Leipzig – 19 April 1871 in Leipzig) was a German painter.

== Life ==
Jäger began his training in Leipzig, before continuing it at the Akademie in Dresden. In 1830 he moved to Munich, to work in the studio of Julius Schnorr von Carolsfeld. He moved to Rome in 1836, where he painted Balaam and the Angel, before moving back to Munich the following year. There he was one of the artists commissioned to work on the Königsbau frescoes, in his case the Habsburgsaal and the Barbarossasaal, along with the smaller paintings in the Saal Karls d. Gr.

Returning to oil painting, he next painted The Burial of Christ. In 1847 he became the director of the Akademie in Leipzig, though in 1850 he took on the completion of one of Schnorr's major frescoes in the fourth Nibelungensaal in Munich. In 1848 he completed the Herder-Zimmer in the Stadtschloss Weimar.

Other murals by him are to be found in churches in Schönefeld and Klein-Pötzschau near Leipzig, as well as the Aula of the Teichmannschen Unterrichtsanstalt. His canvases include Mary Magdalene washing Christ's feet. He also produced the reverse glass painting Christ as the Prince of Peace for the Christuskirche church at Rüdigsdorf, Kohren-Sahlis.

== Bibliography ==
- Hyacinth Holland: Jaeger, Gustav. In: Allgemeine Deutsche Biographie (ADB). Band 13, Duncker & Humblot, Leipzig 1881, S. 649 f.
