= Pötzschau =

- Ortsteil of Rötha
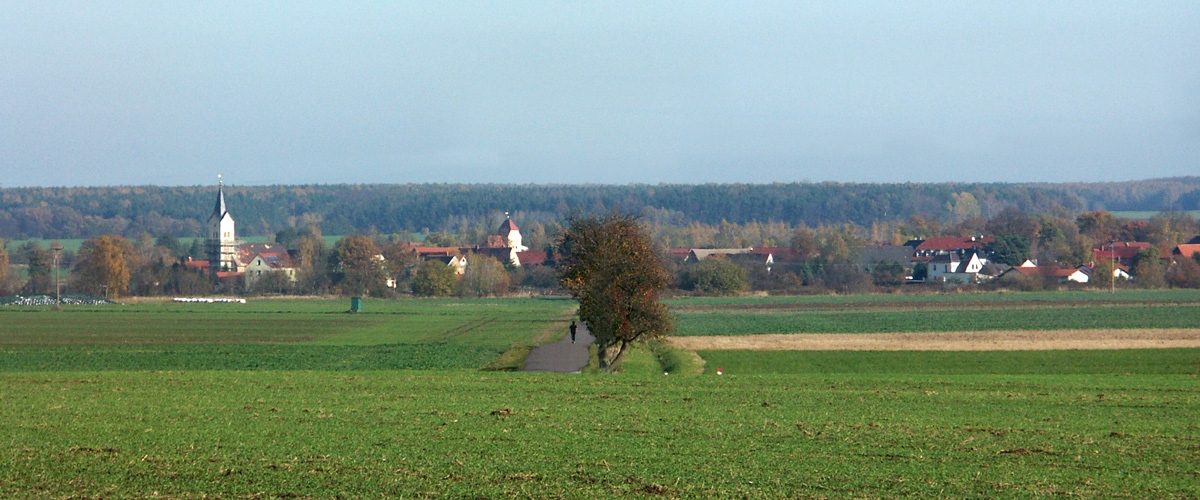
- Pötzschau from the south-west
- Interactive map of Pötzschau
- Location within Germany Location within Saxony
- Coordinates: 51°12′40″N 12°29′06″E
- Country: Germany
- State: Saxony
- Town: Rötha
- Elevation: 131 m (430 ft)

Population (2014-12-31)
  - Total: 374
- Time zone: UTC+01:00 (CET)
  - Summer (DST): UTC+02:00 (CEST)
- Postal codes: 04579
- Dialling codes: 034347

Pötzschau is a village and a former municipality in Saxony, Germany. Since 2015, it has been part of the town of Rötha. It consists of smaller parts: Großpötzschau, Kleinpötzschau, and Dahlitzsch. Pötzschau is located south-east of Leipzig, in the valley of the creek Gösel.

== History ==
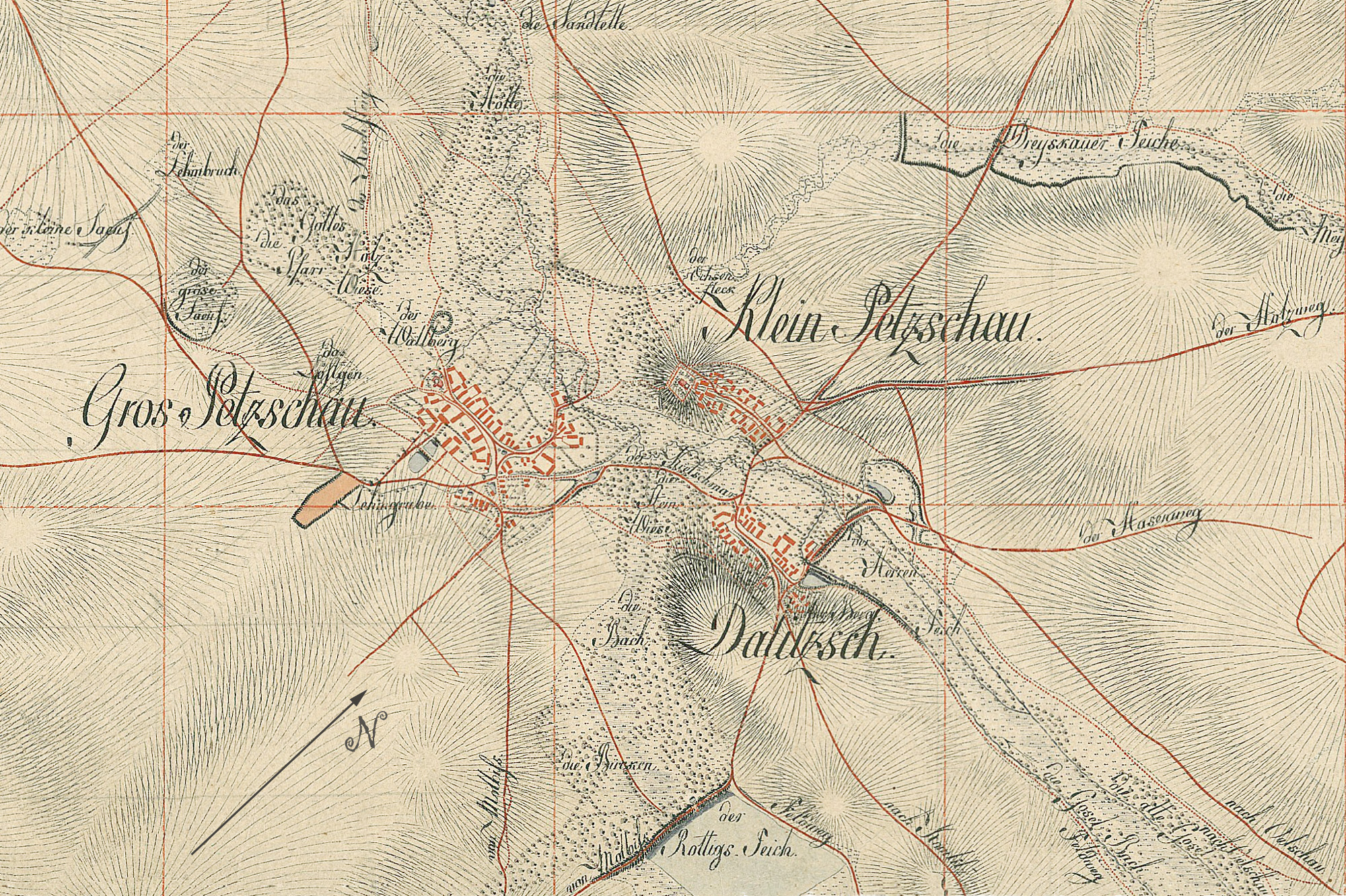
Map around 1800

The first mention was as Beschowe in 1206, the distinction was added, "Groß" (great) in 1514, and "Klein" (small) in 1497. Dahlitzsch was first mentioned as Talzschicz in 1469. Formerly an independent municipality, it was merged into the municipality of Espenhain in 1995. Espenhain was merged into the town of Rötha in 2015.

== Literature ==
- Thomas Nabert, Andreas Berkner, Sigrun Kabisch (ed.): Im Pleiße- und Göselland : zwischen Markkleeberg, Rötha und Kitzscher, ProLeipzig, Leipzig 1999, ISBN 3-9806474-1-2
- Richard Steche: Kleinpötzschau. In: Beschreibende Darstellung der älteren Bau- und Kunstdenkmäler des Königreichs Sachsen, 15. Volume: Amtshauptmannschaft Borna. C. C. Meinhold, Dresden, 1891, p. 65.
