= Magdeborn =

Coordinates: 51°14′N 12°27′E

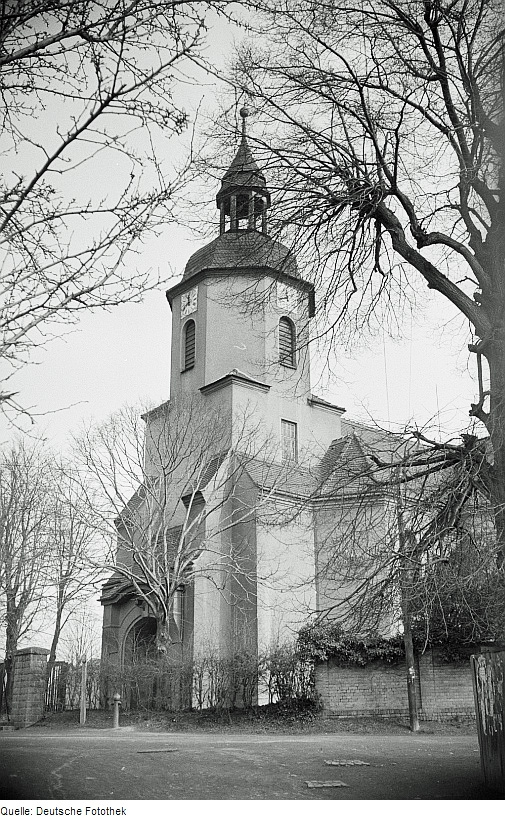
The church in 1953

Magdeborn was a village and a municipality south of Leipzig, Germany. It was in its last form a group of seven villages, named for Magdeborn which consisted only of church, vicary and school, which had served all of them. The name is derived from the castle Medeburu which was first mentioned in 969.

Around 1940 a large housing area was added for workers of the brown coal mining in Espenhain. Between 1977 and 1980 Magdeborn had to give way to the mining, after all inhabitants (ca. 3200) had been moved from the end of the 1960s. Its area was added to the municipality of Störmthal.
