= Gösel =

River in Germany

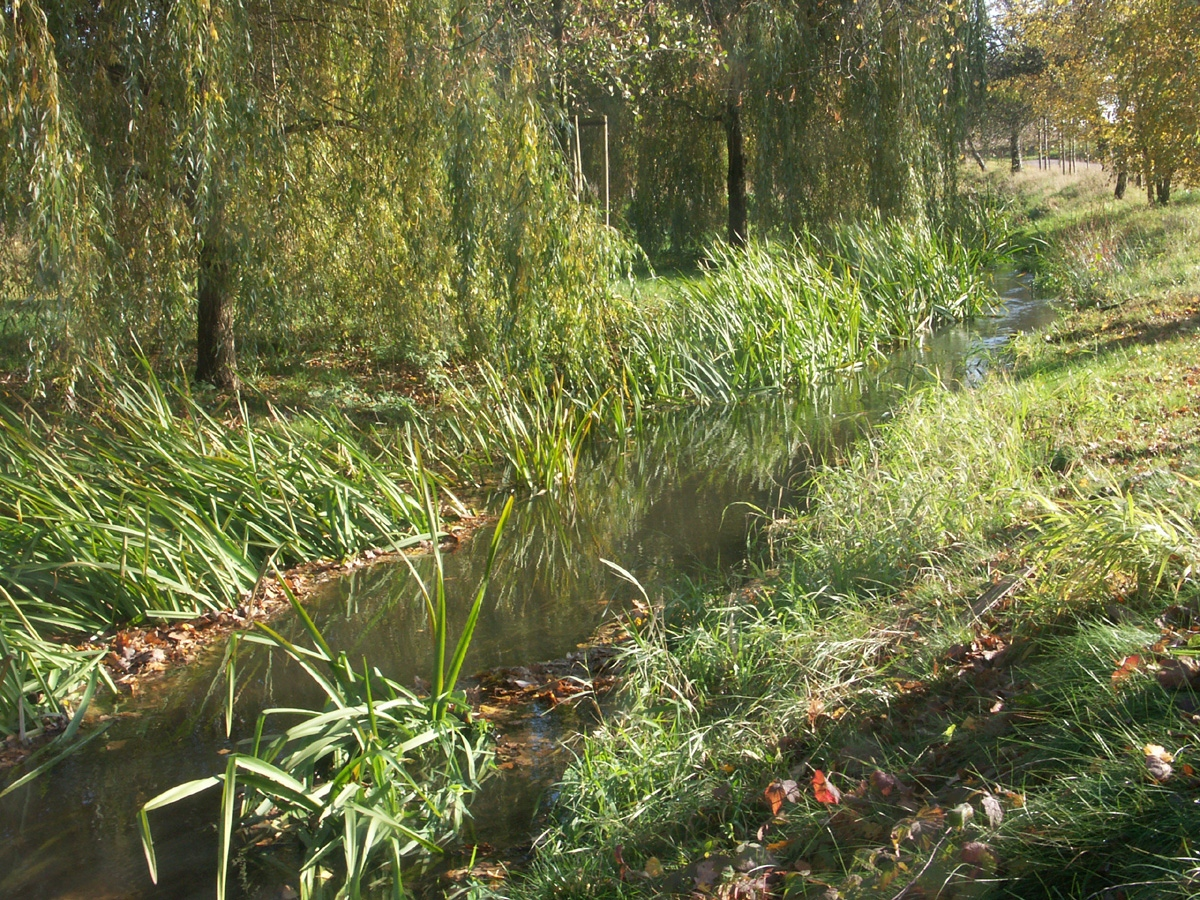

Location
- Country: Germany
- States: Saxony

Physical characteristics
- Mouth
  - location: Pleiße
  - coordinates: 51.2053°N 12.3981°E

Basin features
- Progression: Pleiße→ White Elster→ Saale→ Elbe→ North Sea

The Gösel is a river of Saxony, Germany. It is a right tributary of the Pleiße, which it joins in Rötha.

== Etymology ==
The name, which first appeared in a document in 1168 as Gazele, is probably derived from the Old High German Geizila meaning "goat stream".

== See also ==
- List of rivers of Saxony
