= Dreikönigskirche, Dresden =

Lutheran church in Dresden, Germany

Coordinates: 51°03′40″N 13°44′35″E

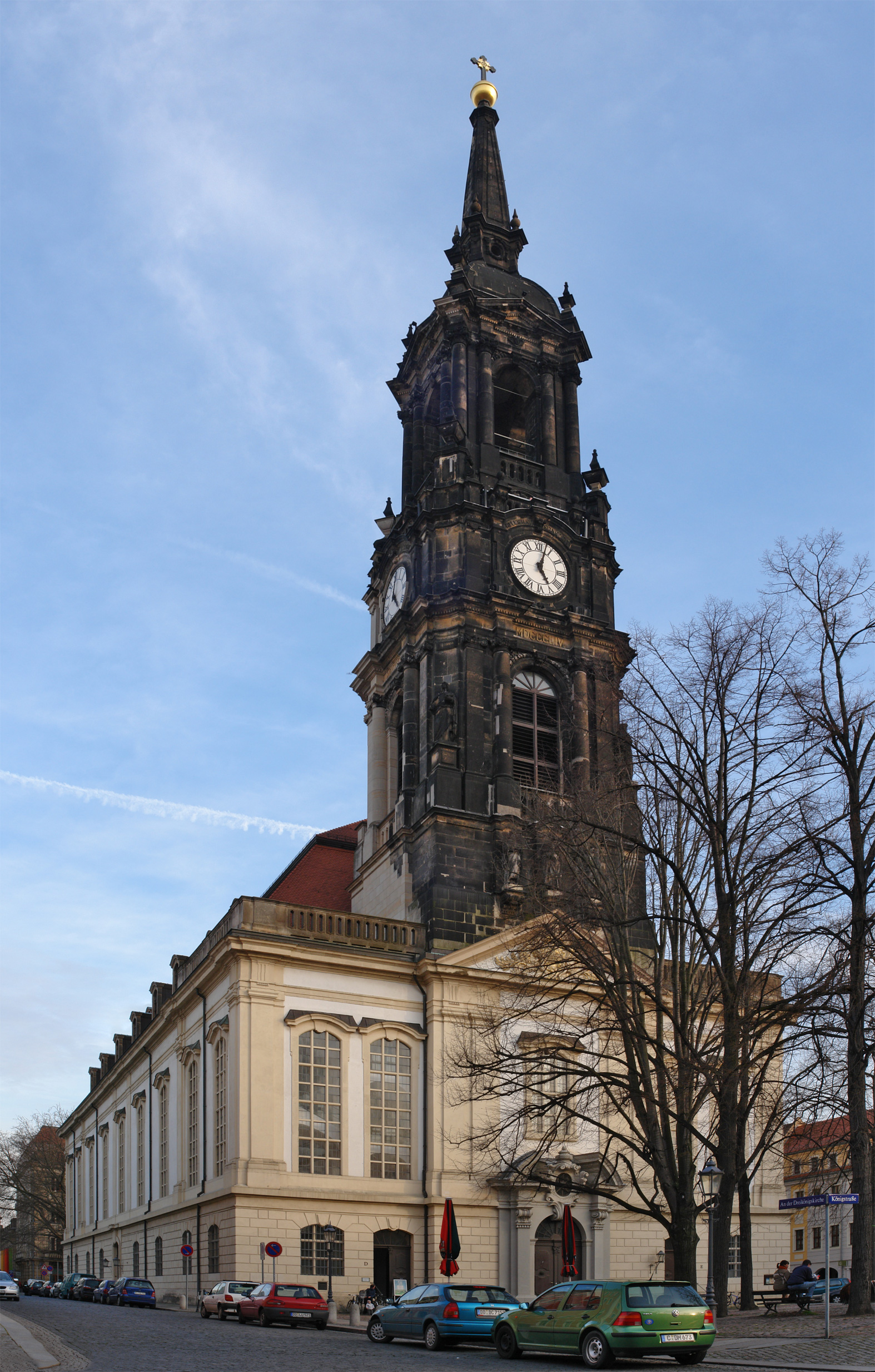
Dreikönigskirche seen from Königstraße

The Dreikönigskirche (Three Kings' Church) is a Lutheran church located in the Innere Neustadt of Dresden, Germany. It is the centre of a parish, and a community venue called Haus der Kirche. The church is a listed cultural monument of Dresden.

A church has been documented as standing at the site of the Dreikönigskirche since the 15th century. The present church was built from 1732 to 1739 with designs by Matthäus Daniel Pöppelmann and with George Bähr responsible for the interior features. The church was destroyed during the bombing of Dresden in World War II and not restored until the 1980s. It served as the seat of the state parliament of Saxony from 1990 to 1993.

== History ==
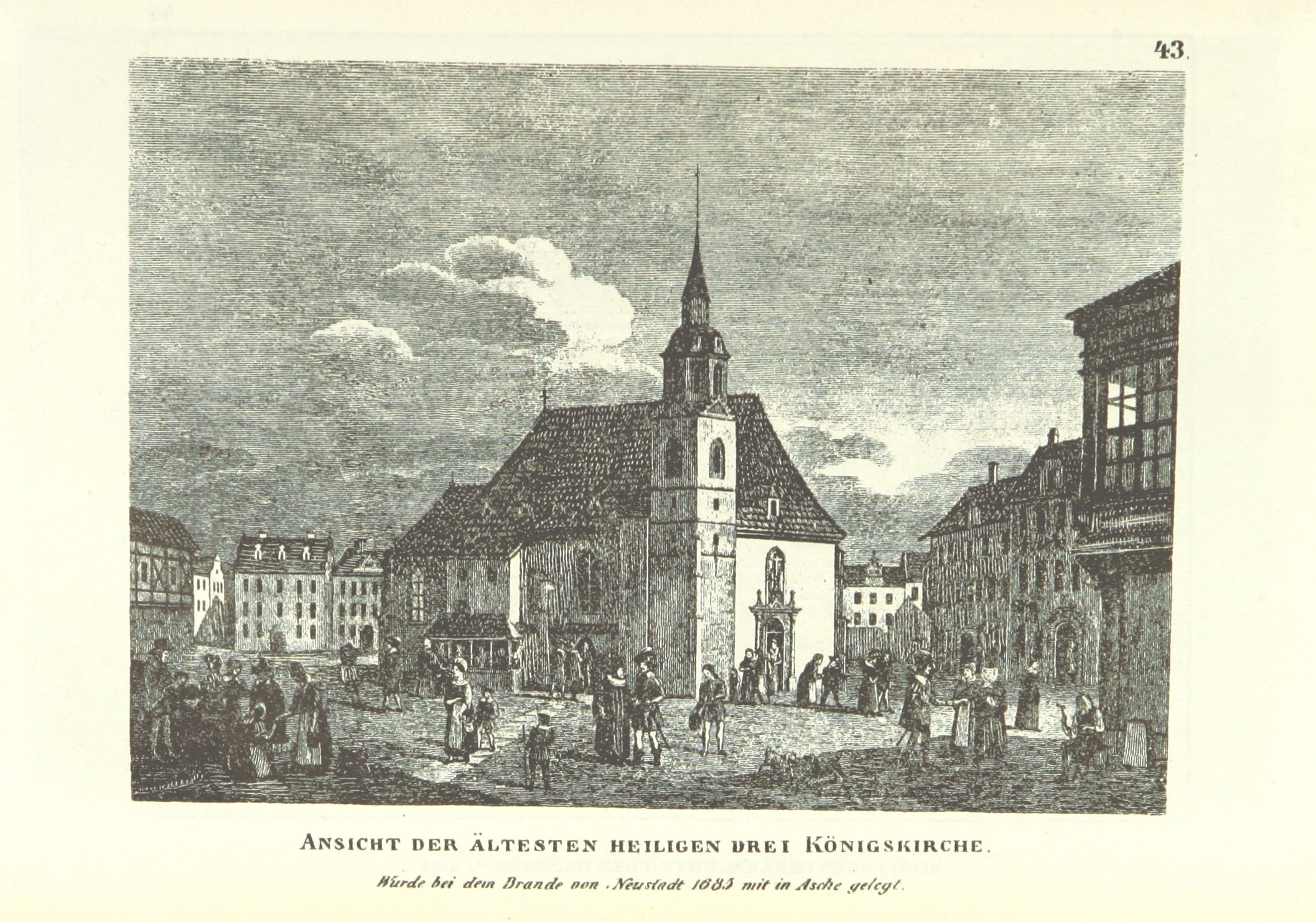
The first Dreikönigskirche

The first Dreikönigskirche was built in 1404 about 200 metres (660 ft) south of the site of the present church in Old Dresden, though the first mention of this church by that name comes from 1421. This placement put the church in what is now the Neustädter Markt, near the centre of Old Dresden. The structure was Gothic in style and had a flat roof over its nave that was topped with two ridge turrets. The church was named for its altarpiece, which depicted the Three Holy Kings. This church was first mentioned in 1421, when the feudal rights over it were passed to the nearby Augustianian monastery following the death of its priest, who had been holding his services at the Erasmi Chapel of the White Gate. The first Dreikönigskirche was destroyed by the Hussites around 1429 but it was rebuilt between 1514 and 1520, still in the Gothic style. During that reconstruction, the church was expanded into a three-aisled hall church with a choir.

The church was again destroyed with much of Old Dresden by fire in 1685. It was rebuilt three years later by master stonemason Johann Benedikt Knöffel and master carpenter Andreas Voigt. A tower was added by 1730. However, the church was demolished in 1731–32 as part of the process of building a new Baroque capital for Duke Augustus II the Strong, as it stood on the new main thoroughfare, the Hauptstraße.

=== Baroque church ===
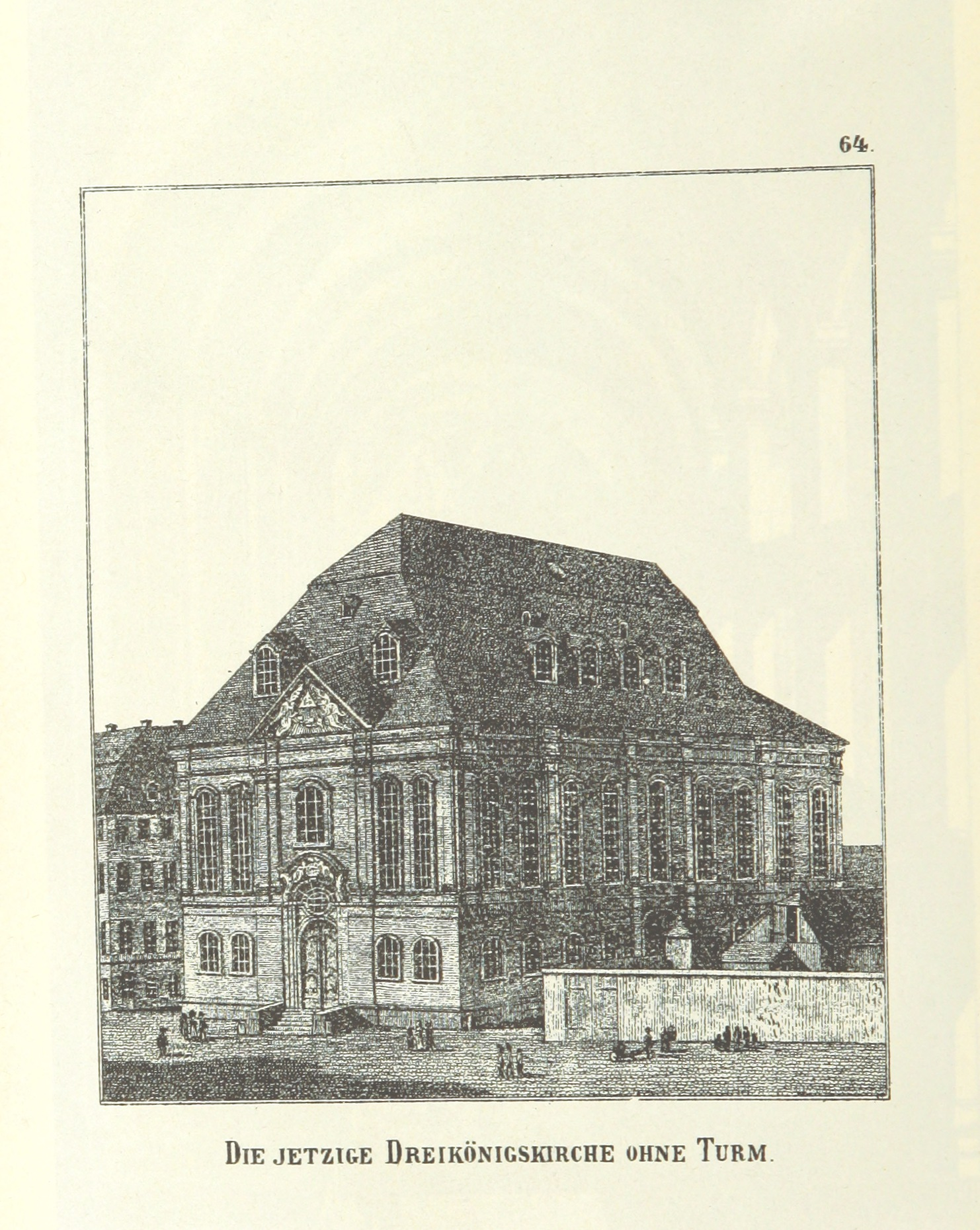
The Altendresden church in 1803, before the construction of the tower

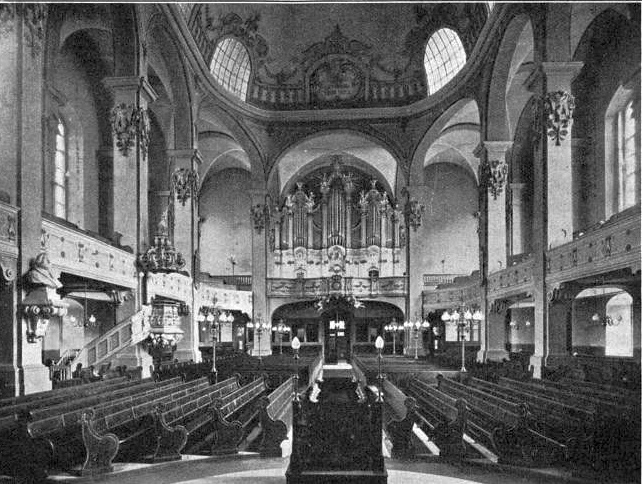
Interior in 1906

A new church was built from 1732 to 1739 at a different location to a plan by Matthäus Daniel Pöppelmann in the Baroque style with interiors by George Bähr, builder of the Frauenkirche. Pöppelmann supervised construction, a role that passed to Bähr when Pöppelmann died in 1734. The church was consecrated on 29 September 1739 (Michaelis) by Superintendent Valentin Ernst Löscher.

There were insufficient funds for the new church's tower and it was only built to a height of 18 metres (59 ft). In the first half of the 19th century, a competition was held to decide the design for a new tower. Noted architect Woldemar Hermann submitted plans, but the design selected was by architects Karl Moritz Haenel and Frommherz Lobegott Marx. Construction of the tower, paid for by donations and public funding, lasted from 1854 to 1857. A water fountain was added in 1858 in the church's western forecourt. Later in the 19th century, the original, gabled roof was replaced with a mansard roof and one of the galleries was removed. In 1887, the Dreikönigskirche's role as the seat of the Evangelical Lutheran Parish of Neustadt-Dresden was passed to the newly constructed Martin Luther Church.

The Dreikönigskirche was restored in 1933–34 under the direction of local architect Rudolph Kolbe.

=== Destruction and reconstruction ===
On 13 February 1945, the Dreikönigskirche was destroyed during an air raid on Dresden, leaving only its façade and the tower. Church services resumed in the ruins of the Dreikönigskirche when the rubble was removed, and plans for demolition were resisted by locals. Debate on the fate of the church lasted until 1977, when it was decided that it should be rebuilt.

The cornerstone of the rebuilt church was laid on 31 October 1984 and lasted until the church was reconsecrated on 9 September 1990. The reconstruction retained the exterior, but created a modern complex inside with seating for 450 occupants instead of the original 3,000. Ten conference rooms are mostly used for lectures, meetings, courses, concerts and exhibitions. The centre was called Haus der Kirche.

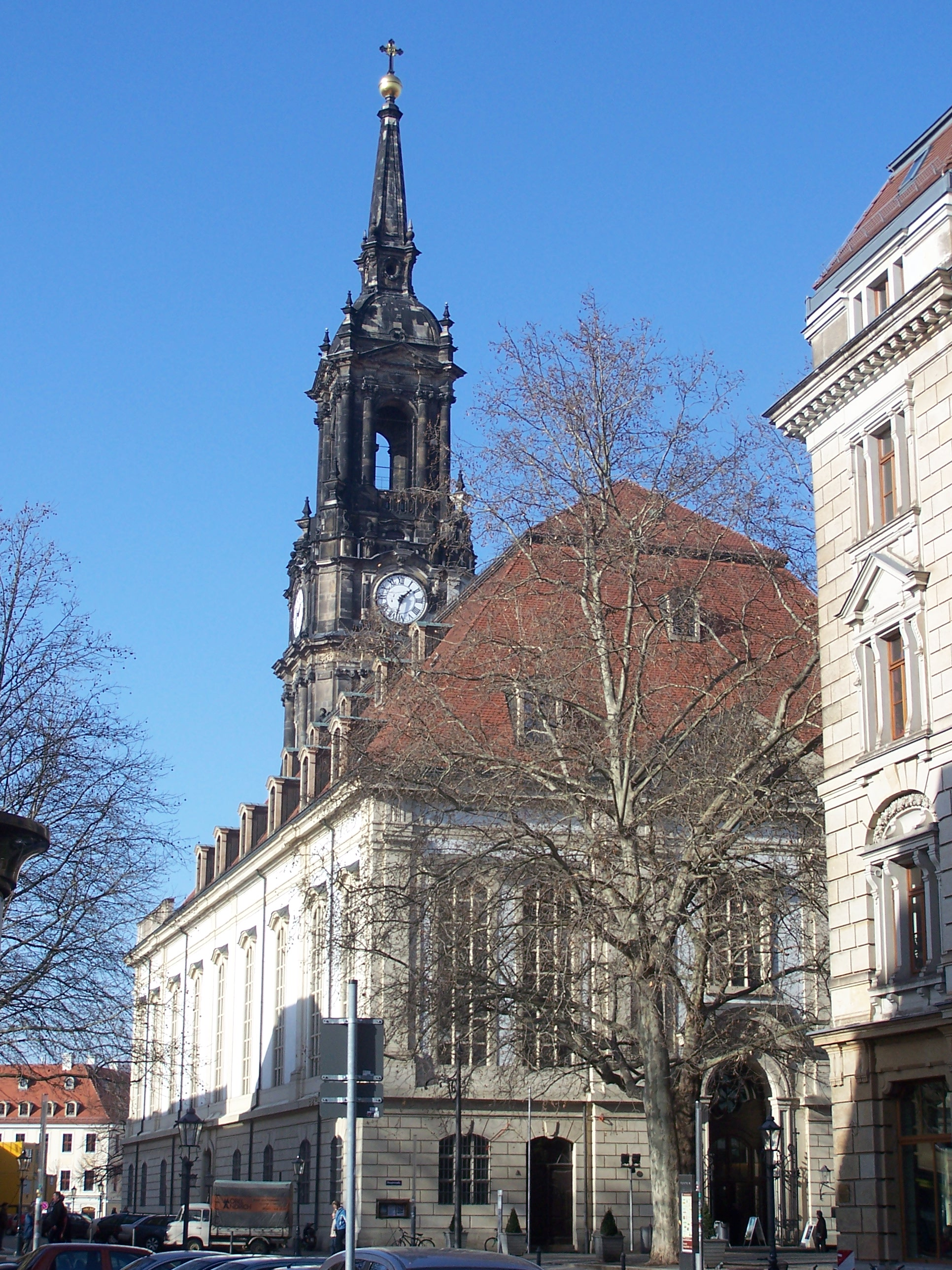
View to the entrance

After the reconstruction, the Dreikönigskirche served again the centre of the parish. On 27 October 1990, the first meeting of the Sächsischer Landtag, the new state parliament formed after the Wende, took place in the Dreikönigskirche. It served as the interim seat of parliament until the new building was completed in October 1993. The tower was restored from 1993 to 1995. It has been open to visitors since 1999.

== Architecture ==
The Dreikönigskirche was built on the west side of the Hauptstraße on top of what was the main cemetery, which was moved north to become the Innerer Neustädter Friedhof. As such, it was not oriented east–west as is usual for churches. Also unusual for church architecture, the altar adorns the west rather than east side of the church, as the main entrance was placed on the west. This break with traditional church architecture was cause for controversy between the parish leadership and Augustus II.

The Dreikönigskirche's tower stands 87.5 m (287 ft) high. It was designed and built in the Baroque Revival style to match the existing church and decorated with sculptures of the Four Evangelists and the Three Kings. A total of 3,867 cubic metres (136,600 cu ft) of sandstone was sourced from the Saxon Switzerland for the completion of the tower.

=== Interior ===
The altar was carved in the Baroque style out of sandstone by Johann Benjamin Thomae in 1741. The Parable of the Ten Virgins, bookended by images of the Apostles John and Matthew, is depicted in relief on the altar. Thomae's altar survived the destruction of the church during World War II, but it was damaged and has never been repaired.

Organ builder Zacharias Hildebrandt built the Baroque church's organ between 1754 and 1757. It was the last organ he built before his death, and it was destroyed during World War II.

==== Dresden Totentanz ====
In 1990, during the final phase of the reconstruction of the Dreikönigskirche, the Dresden Totentanz was installed below the organ loft. The Totentanz is a stone relief of the danse macabre. It was carved in 1534 by the German sculptor Christoph Walther I for George, Duke of Saxony. The Totenkranz is 12.5 metres (41 ft) long and 1.2 metres (3 ft 11 in) high and depicts 27 figures – 24 humans and three representations of Death. Among the human figures are Charles V, Holy Roman Emperor and Duke George, whose Roman Catholic faith is emphasized in the relief.

The Totentanz originally was located in Dresden Castle. When the castle was destroyed by fire in 1701, the Totentanz was donated to the parish of the Dreikönigskirche by Augustus II.
