= Rötha =

- Town
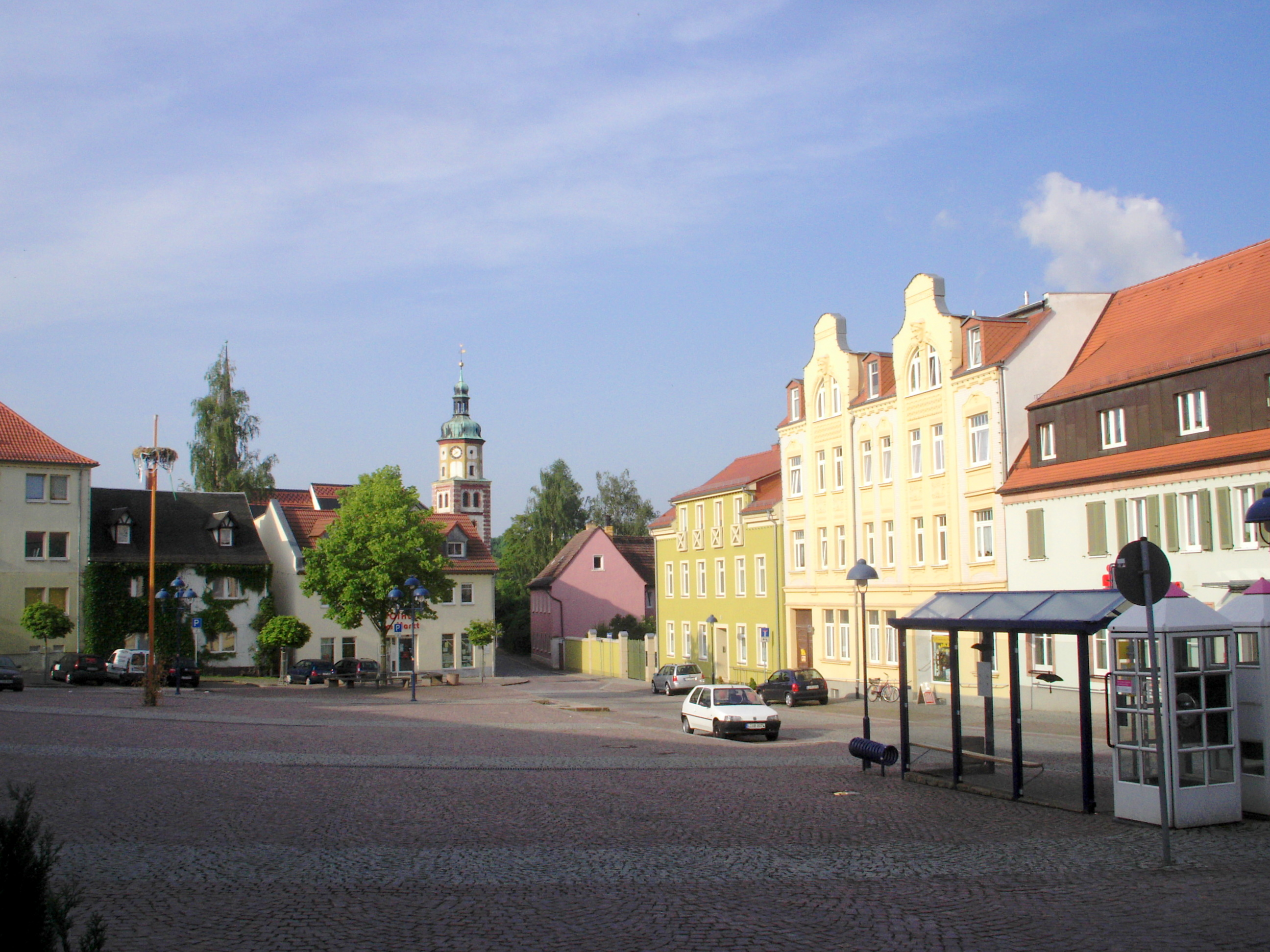
- Centre of Rötha

- Coat of arms

- Location of Rötha within Leipzig district
- Interactive map of Rötha
- Location within Germany Location within Saxony
- Coordinates: 51°11′50″N 12°25′2″E
- Country: Germany
- State: Saxony
- District: Leipzig

Government
  - Mayor (2022–29): Pascal Németh

Area
  - Total: 46.16 km^{2} (17.82 sq mi)
- Elevation: 128 m (420 ft)

Population (2025-12-31)
  - Total: 6,388
  - Density: 138.4/km^{2} (358.4/sq mi)
- Time zone: UTC+01:00 (CET)
  - Summer (DST): UTC+02:00 (CEST)
- Postal codes: 04571, 04579 (Espenhain)
- Dialling codes: 034206
- Vehicle registration: L, BNA, GHA, GRM, MTL, WUR
- Website: www.roetha.de

Rötha (German pronunciation: [ˈʁøːta]) is a town in the Leipzig district, in Saxony, Germany. It is situated 16 km south of Leipzig. On 1 August 2015 it was expanded with the former municipality Espenhain.

== Districts ==
- Mölbis - independent village until 1999, formerly infamous for being the most polluted village in the GDR, later in all of Europe ("der dreckigste Ort Europas") because of its vicinity to Espenhain lignite industry plants
- Espenhain
- Oelzschau
- Pötzschau
