= Zacharias Hildebrandt =

German organ builder (1688–1757)

Zacharias Hildebrandt (1688, Münsterberg, Silesia – 11 October 1757, Dresden, Saxony) was a German organ builder. In 1714, his father Heinrich Hildebrandt, a cartwright master, apprenticed him to the famous organ builder Gottfried Silbermann, brother of Andreas Silbermann in Freiberg. In 1721, Hildebrandt finished his masterpiece, the organ of the Nikolaikirche of Langhennersdorf, a small village near Freiberg. Afterwards he built an organ in Störmthal near Leipzig (where befriended Johann Sebastian Bach) and from 1724 to 1726 an organ in Lengefeld. On this project, a dispute developed with Gottfried Silbermann, who treated him as a rival and sued him. The dispute was settled by an agreement in which Hildebrandt obliged himself to take over only orders rejected by Silbermann. Therefore, he moved his work to the region near Leipzig and to Thuringia. J.S. Bach thought Hildebrandt was the best organ builder of his time.

Hildebrandt's largest organ has 3 manuals and a pedalboard with 53 stops, and is located in the church of St. Wenzel in Naumburg an der Saale. Built from 1743 to 1746, in the 27th of September of the latter year, examinations were carried out by Silbermann and Bach. Hildebrandt had resorted to advice from the latter for its stoplist. The organ which had been rebuilt several times since then has been completely restored from 1993 to 2000 by Eule Orgelbau, and is commonly deemed Hildebrandt's magnum opus.

His son Johann Gottfried Hildebrandt (1724 or 1725 – 1775) was also an organ builder.

== Organ list ==
He constructed the following organs:

Place		Manuals	Stops	Annotations
Langhennersdorf b. Freiberg	1722	II / Ped	21	Restored (1990-1996)
Störmthal b. Leipzig	1723	I / Ped	14	Restored (Eule 2008)
Hilbersdorf b. Freiberg	1724	I	5	Restored, now in Leipzig
Liebertwolkwitz b. Leipzig	1725	I / Ped	13	Destroyed (1813)
Lengefeld i. Erzgebirge	1726	II / Ped	22	Restored (2010-2014)
Sangerhausen, Hl. Geist-Stift	1727	I	6	Not preserved
Sangerhausen, St. Jacobi	1728	II / Ped	27	Restored (1976-1978)
Pölsfeld b. Sangerhausen	1728	I / Ped	11(?)	Several stops added by Hildebrandt
Sotterhausen b. Sangerhausen	1730	I / Ped	9	Restored (2005)
Lindenau b. Leipzig	1732	I / Ped	10	Not preserved
Eutritzsch b. Leipzig	1736	I / Ped	10	Not preserved
Naumburg, St. Wenzel	1746	III / Ped	53	Restored (1993-2000)
Großwiederitzsch b. Leipzig	1748	I / Ped	10	Demolished (1902)
Hettstedt i. Südharz, St. Jacobi	1749	II / Ped	31	Only façade preserved
Goldbach b. Bischofswerda	1756	I / Ped	10	Modified (1908)
Dresden, Dreikönigskirche	1757	II / Ped	38	Destroyed in the Bombing of Dresden (1945)
