= Großpösna =

- Municipality
- Coat of arms

- Location of Großpösna within Leipzig district
- Interactive map of Großpösna
- Location within Germany Location within Saxony
- Coordinates: 51°16′N 12°30′E
- Country: Germany
- State: Saxony
- District: Leipzig
- Subdivisions: 4

Government
  - Mayor (2022–29): Daniel Strobel

Area
  - Total: 41.55 km^{2} (16.04 sq mi)
- Elevation: 150 m (490 ft)

Population (2025-12-31)
  - Total: 5,716
  - Density: 137.6/km^{2} (356.3/sq mi)
- Time zone: UTC+01:00 (CET)
  - Summer (DST): UTC+02:00 (CEST)
- Postal codes: 04463
- Dialling codes: 034297
- Vehicle registration: L, BNA, GHA, GRM, MTL, WUR
- Website: grosspoesna.com

Großpösna (German pronunciation: [ˈɡʁoːsˌpøːsna], lit. 'Big Pösna', in contrast to "Little Pösna") is a municipality in the Leipzig district, in Saxony, Germany. It consists of Großpösna proper and the Ortschaften (localities) Dreiskau-Muckern, Güldengossa, Seifertshain and Störmthal.

== Points of interest ==
- Botanischer Garten für Arznei- und Gewürzpflanzen Oberholz, a botanical garden
- Highfield Festival, a music festival that takes place at the Störmthaler See near Großpösna, usually every August.
