= Pösgraben =

River in Germany

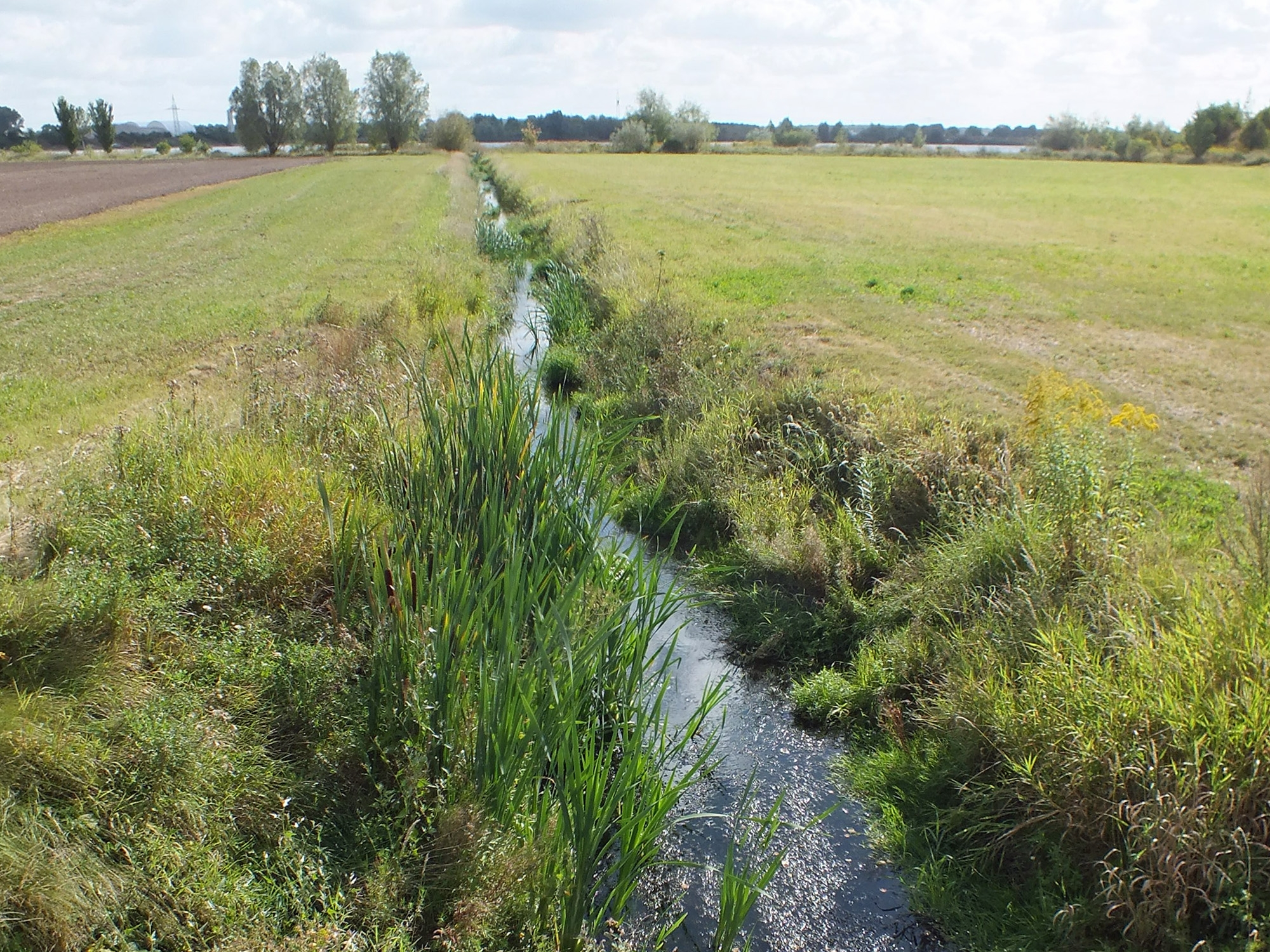

Location
- Country: Germany
- State: Saxony
- City: Leipzig

Physical characteristics
- Source
  - location: im Oberholz
  - coordinates: 51°15′20″N 12°30′40″E
  - elevation: 158 m
- Mouth
  - location: south of Zweenfurth via the Ochsengraben
  - coordinates: 51°19′16″N 12°32′39″E
  - elevation: 125 m
- Length: 10.5 km (12.1 km including the Ochsengraben)

Basin features
- Progression: Threne→ Parthe→ White Elster→ Saale→ Elbe→ North Sea

The Pösgraben is a river of Saxony, Germany. It flows into the Threne near Zweenfurth.

== See also ==
- List of rivers of Saxony
