= Espenhain =

- Ortsteil of Rötha
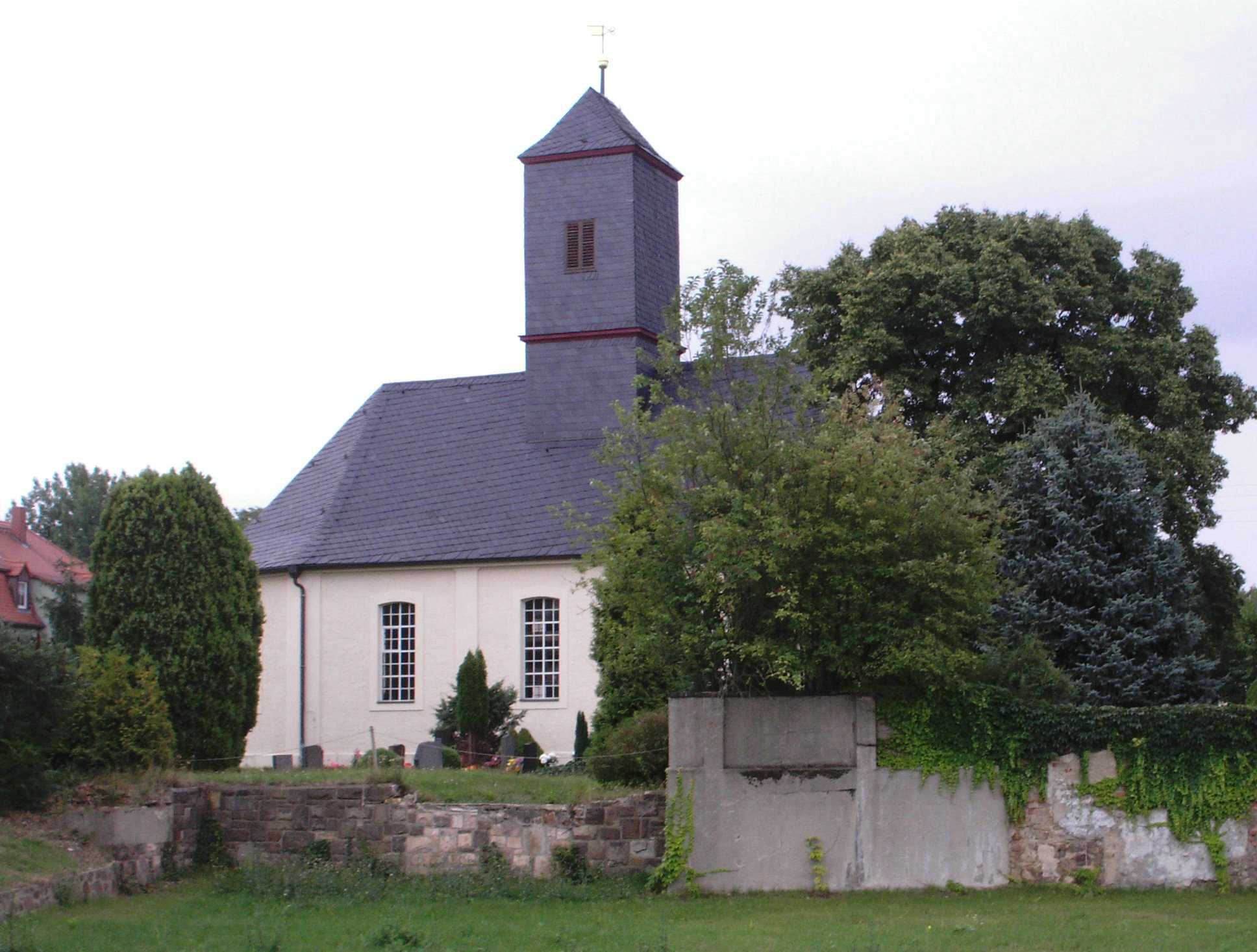
- Church
- Interactive map of Espenhain
- Location within Germany Location within Saxony
- Coordinates: 51°11′30″N 12°28′10″E
- Country: Germany
- State: Saxony
- District: Leipzig
- Town: Rötha
- Subdivisions: 4

Area
  - Total: 28.15 km^{2} (10.87 sq mi)
- Elevation: 164 m (538 ft)

Population (2013-12-31)
  - Total: 2,267
  - Density: 80.53/km^{2} (208.6/sq mi)
- Time zone: UTC+01:00 (CET)
  - Summer (DST): UTC+02:00 (CEST)
- Postal codes: 04579
- Dialling codes: 034206
- Vehicle registration: L

Espenhain is a village and a former municipality in the Leipzig district, in Saxony, Germany. On 1 August 2015 it was merged into the town Rötha.

== Geography ==
Espenhain is situated in the Leipzig Bay approx. 20 km south Leipzig and 8 km north of Borna, in the middle of the newly minted New Lake District.

== Economy ==
=== Solar power plant ===
The solar power plant Espenhain Leipzig is in the municipality. This power plant is a photovoltaic power station. It is a partnership project of the Berlin project development company Geosol and Shell. The power plant was dedicated on the September 8, 2004 and at that time one of the largest of its type in Europe.
