= Störmthal =

- Village of Großpösna
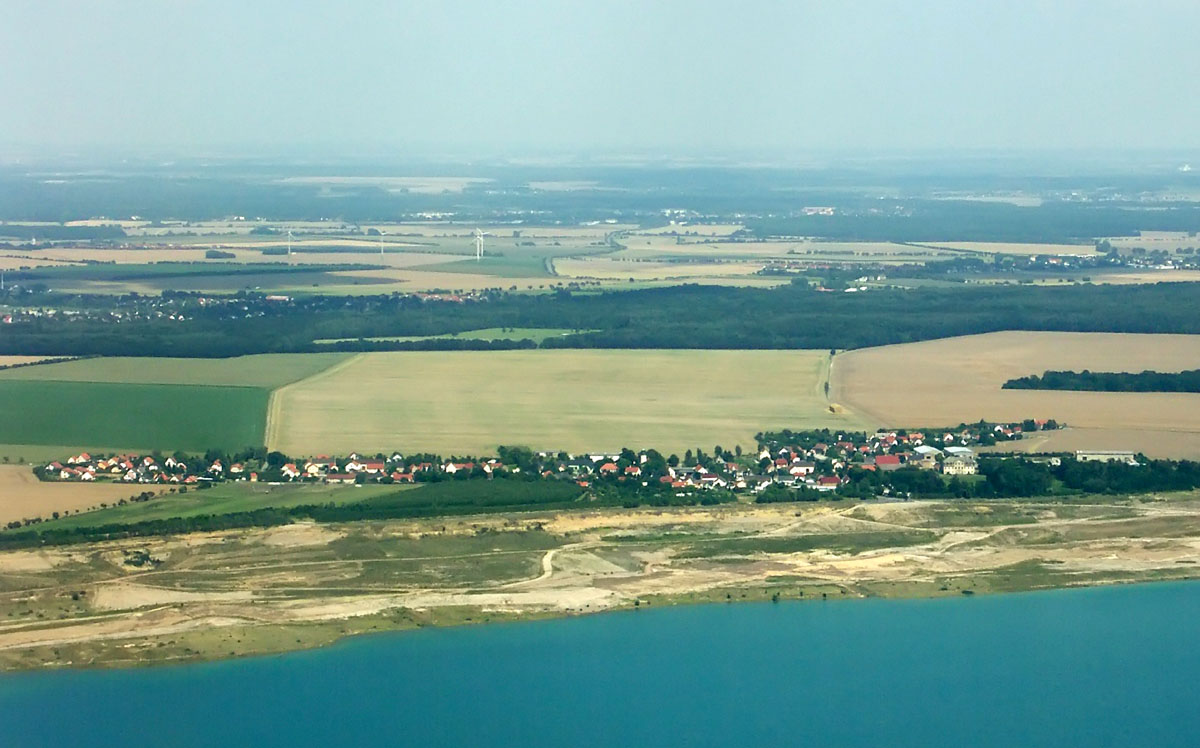
- Aerial view of Störmthal on the lake 2008
- Interactive map of Störmthal
- Location within Germany Location within Saxony
- Coordinates: 51°14′50″N 12°28′15″E
- Country: Germany
- State: Saxony
- District: Leipzig
- Municipality: Großpösna
- Elevation: 147 m (482 ft)

Population (2014-12-31)
  - Total: 512
- Time zone: UTC+01:00 (CET)
  - Summer (DST): UTC+02:00 (CEST)
- Postal codes: 04463

Störmthal is a village, part of Großpösna in the Leipzig district in Saxony, Germany. It is known for its church in Baroque style. The organ, an early work by Zacharias Hildebrandt, was played and inaugurated by Johann Sebastian Bach and is still mostly in the condition of Bach's time.

== History ==
The area was settled from the 11th century when the village was founded. The first document dates from 1306, when the village was mentioned in a Zinsregister (register of interest) of the Pegau Abbey. From 1350, the village was ruled by different noble families.

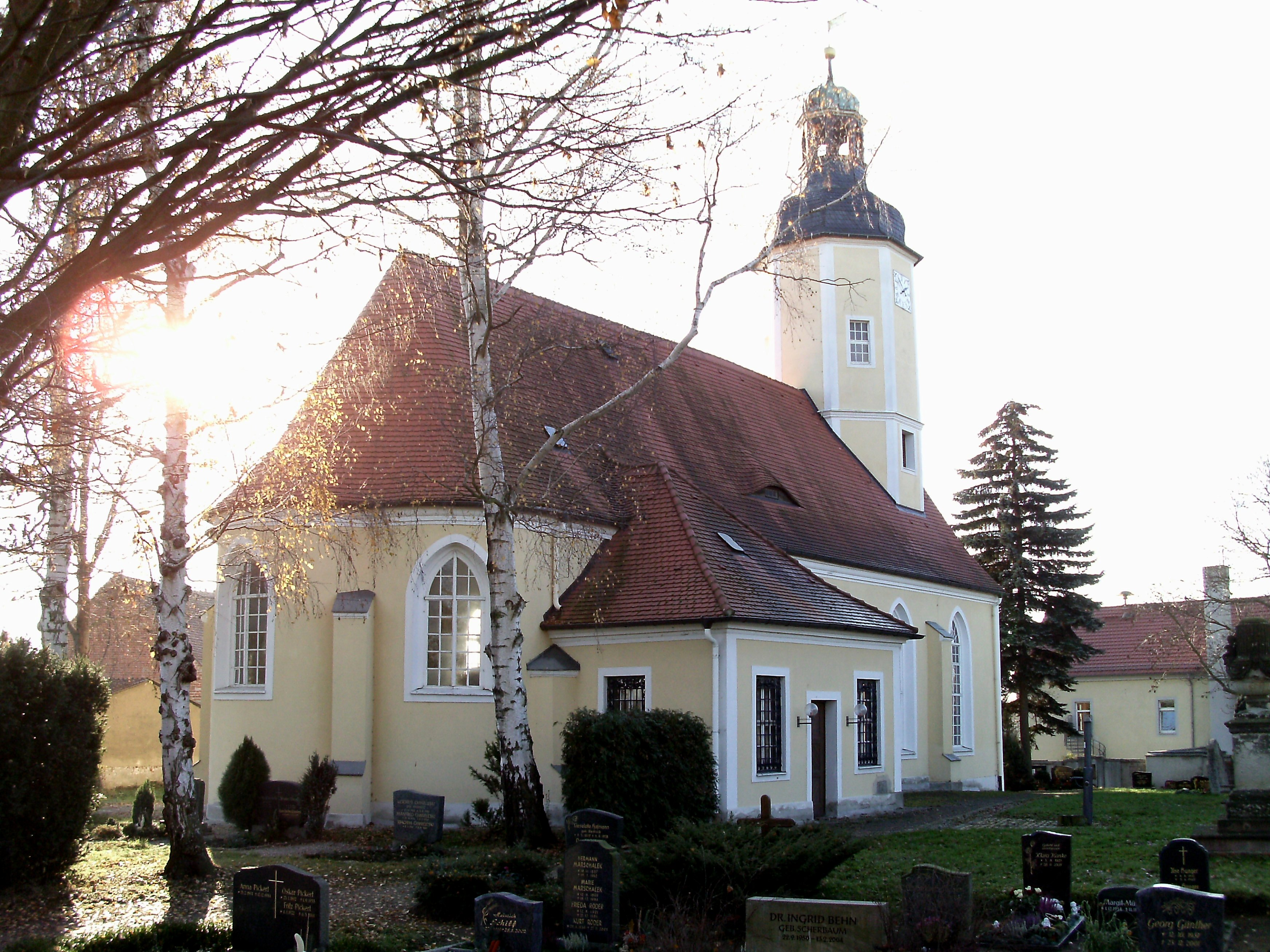
Störmthal church

From 1675, Störmthal was ruled by Statz Friedrich von Fullen, who had an influential position at the Dresden court. He made the village an independent parish in 1690 and had the first village school opened a year later. From 1693, he began building a Schloss with an extended park. The old church was demolished in 1722 and replaced by a new church, Kreuzkirche, in Baroque style.

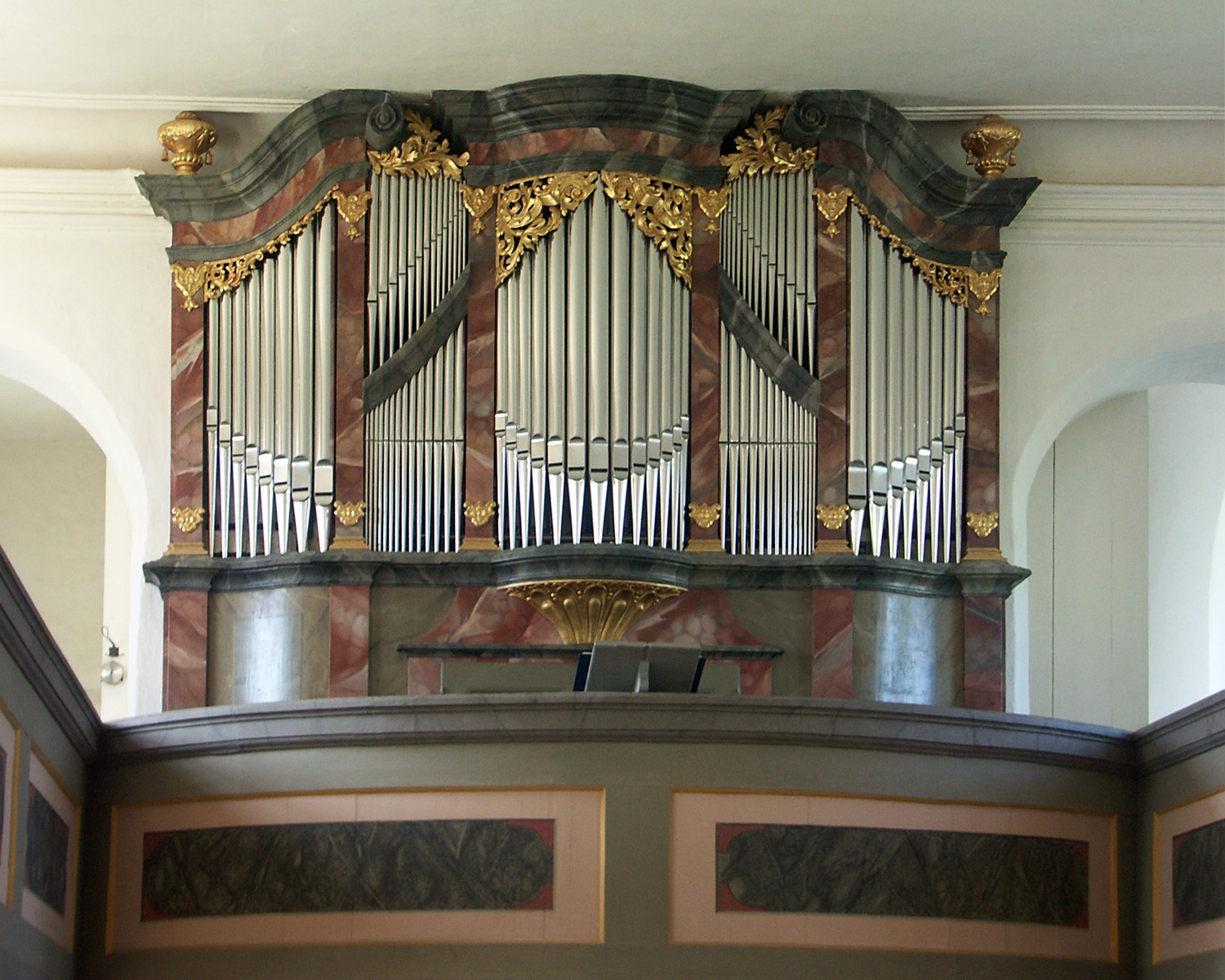
Hildebrandt organ

The new organ, completed in 1723, was built by Zacharias Hildebrandt. It was his first organ after he had studied in the workshop of Gottfried Silbermann. Approval of the completed instrument was carried out by Johann Sebastian Bach at the request of Von Fullen, the patron of the church. Bach was satisfied; he composed and directed a cantata for the dedication of church and organ on 2 November 1723, Höchsterwünschtes Freudenfest, BWV 194. The organ is one of few instruments played by Bach which is still mostly in the same condition. The organ has been praised for the "brilliantly proportioned plan of the façade", the functionality of its suspended action and wind system, and its "variety and quality of tone", namely an "endearing sweetness which diverges from the characteristically bold voice of Silbermann’s work".

Störmthal became part of Großpösna on 1 January 1996.

== People ==
- Johann Gottfried Hildebrandt (1724–1775), organ builder, son of Zacharias Hildebrandt, pupil of Gottfried Silbermann
- Friedrich Naumann (1860–1919), politician

== Literature ==
- Schumann, August (1824). "Störmthal". Vollständiges Staats-, Post- und Zeitungslexikon von Sachsen (in German). Vol. 11. Zwickau. p. 400.
- Cornelius Gurlitt: Störmthal. In: Beschreibende Darstellung der älteren Bau- und Kunstdenkmäler des Königreichs Sachsen, 16. Volume: Amtshauptmannschaft Leipzig (Leipzig Land). C. C. Meinhold, Dresden, 1894, p. 117.
