= Liebertwolkwitz =

- Ortsteil of Leipzig
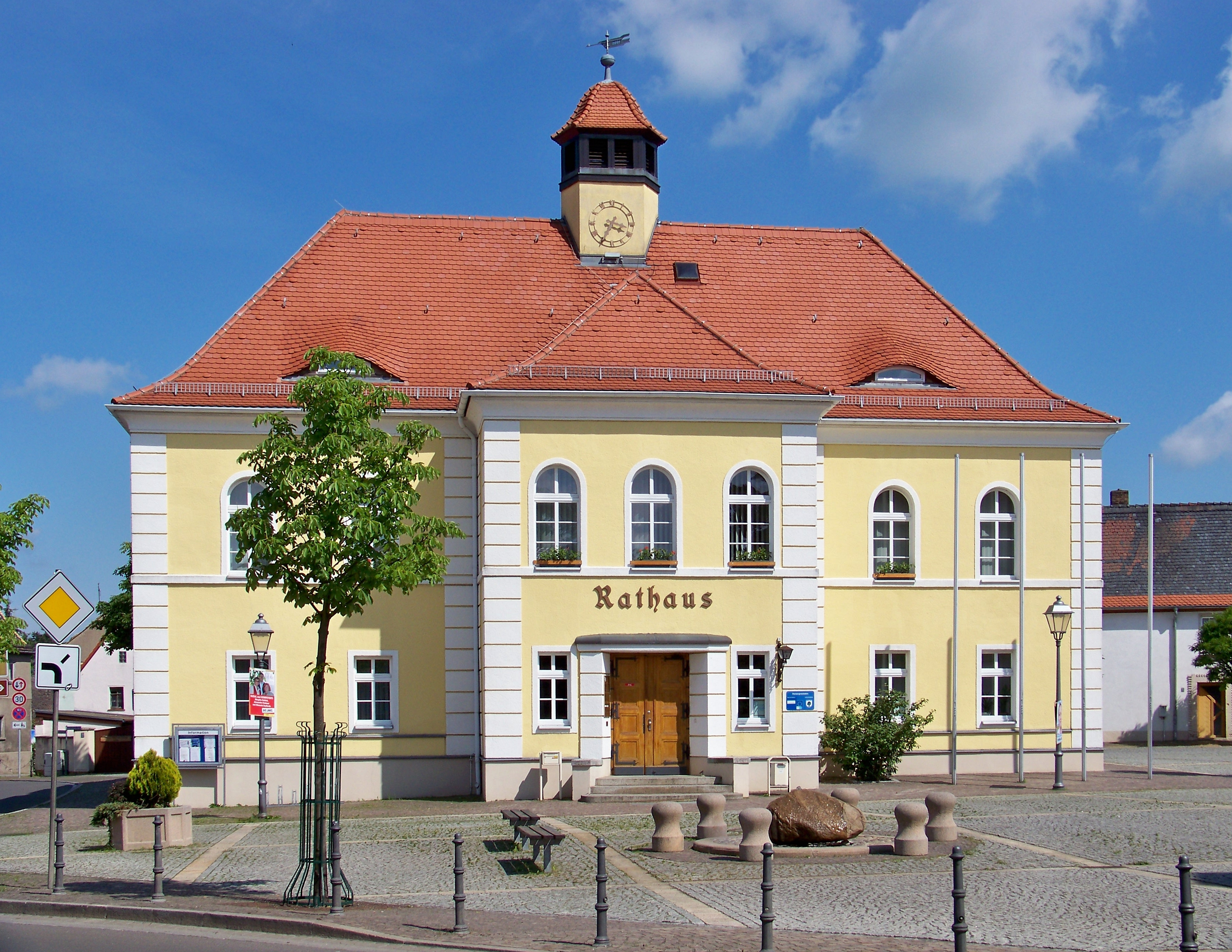
- Liebertwolkwitz: The council offices (Rathaus)
- Interactive map of Liebertwolkwitz
- Location within Germany Location within Saxony
- Coordinates: 51°16′58″N 12°27′50″E
- Country: Germany
- State: Saxony
- City: Leipzig
- Borough: Liebertwolkwitz

Area
  - Total: 9.26 km^{2} (3.58 sq mi)
- Elevation: 163 m (535 ft)

Population (2014-12-31)
  - Total: 5,240
  - Density: 566/km^{2} (1,470/sq mi)
- Time zone: UTC+01:00 (CET)
  - Summer (DST): UTC+02:00 (CEST)
- Postal codes: 04288
- Vehicle registration: L

Liebertwolkwitz (German pronunciation: [ˈliːbɛʁtˌvɔlkvɪts]) is an outlying settlement and locality of Leipzig on the city's south side. It contains the Galgenberg, the highest elevation in the Leipzig area. It was established in or before 1040.

Before the local government boundary reform in 1999, it was an administratively independent municipality.

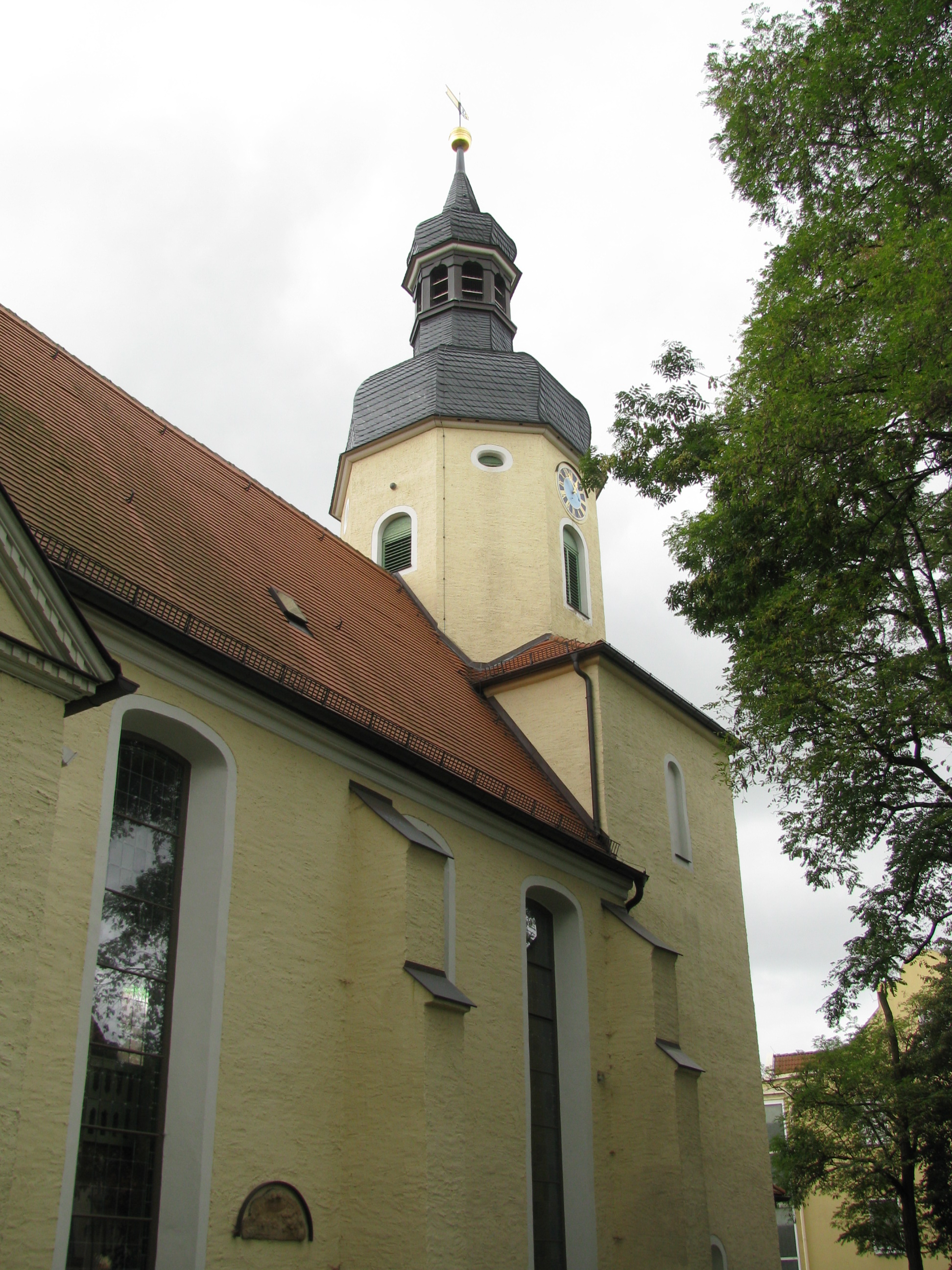
The church tower was rebuilt in 1702 which left it taller and more ornate.

== History ==
=== Origins ===
The first surviving record of the place, then identified as "Niwolkesthorp", dates from 1040. It is likely to have originated in the 7th or 8th century, however, as a Slavic settlement.

=== Church ===
Fire destroyed the Romanesque church in 1575. It was replaced with a rectangular structure which featured a stout tower at its west end. In 1702 this tower was rebuilt in the Baroque style, which left it taller and more ornate.

=== The Battle of Leipzig ===
Monarchenhügel (Monarchs Hill), part of the higher ground within the territory of Liebertwolkwitz, is of particular historical significance. It was from here, in October 1813 as fighting reached its climax, that the Austrian Emperor, the Russian Czar and the Prussian King oversaw their armies against Napoleon in the four-day Battle of Leipzig. Casualties were high on both sides, but the coalition of the three emperors won, turning the tide of the Great War (as it was known to the English at the time) decisively against the French. One victim of the battle was a church organ which had been built back in 1725 by Zacharias Hildebrandt, a contemporary and friend of Bach.

Two days before the climax, the so-called "Cavalry Clash of Liebertwolkwitz" ("Gefecht bei Liebertwolkwitz") in open countryside to the south of the town took place. The Prussian Dragoon Lieutenant Guido von der Lippe attacked the French Marshal Murat who was poorly protected, but was nevertheless able to get away from von Lippe who was diverted by a French equerry who himself was killed while Murat fled. The skirmish was immortalised much later in a painting by Richard Knötel.

There is also a memorial, erected in 1852, on the Galgenberg, the hilltop which was Napoleon's command post in the early part of the battle and later, briefly, of the three coalition emperors.

=== Modern developments ===
Large-scale industrial development came to Liebertwolkwitz around 1880, with the production processes making use of the Clay minerals mined locally. The industry-sector remains important to the local economy.

In 1908 the municipal bathhouse was built: today it houses a fitness club.

== The name ==
The fifteen character four syllable name of Liebertwolkwitz is often shortened locally to "Wolks": residents may refer to themselves as "Wolkser".

== Event ==
Liebertwolkwitz - a village in 1813, annual festival organized on a weekend in October by the "Hofgenossenschaft Stiftsgut Liebertwolkwitz eG" in memory of life at the time of the Battle of Leipzig, with the reconstruction of traditional crafts and life in the 19th century.

== Traffic ==
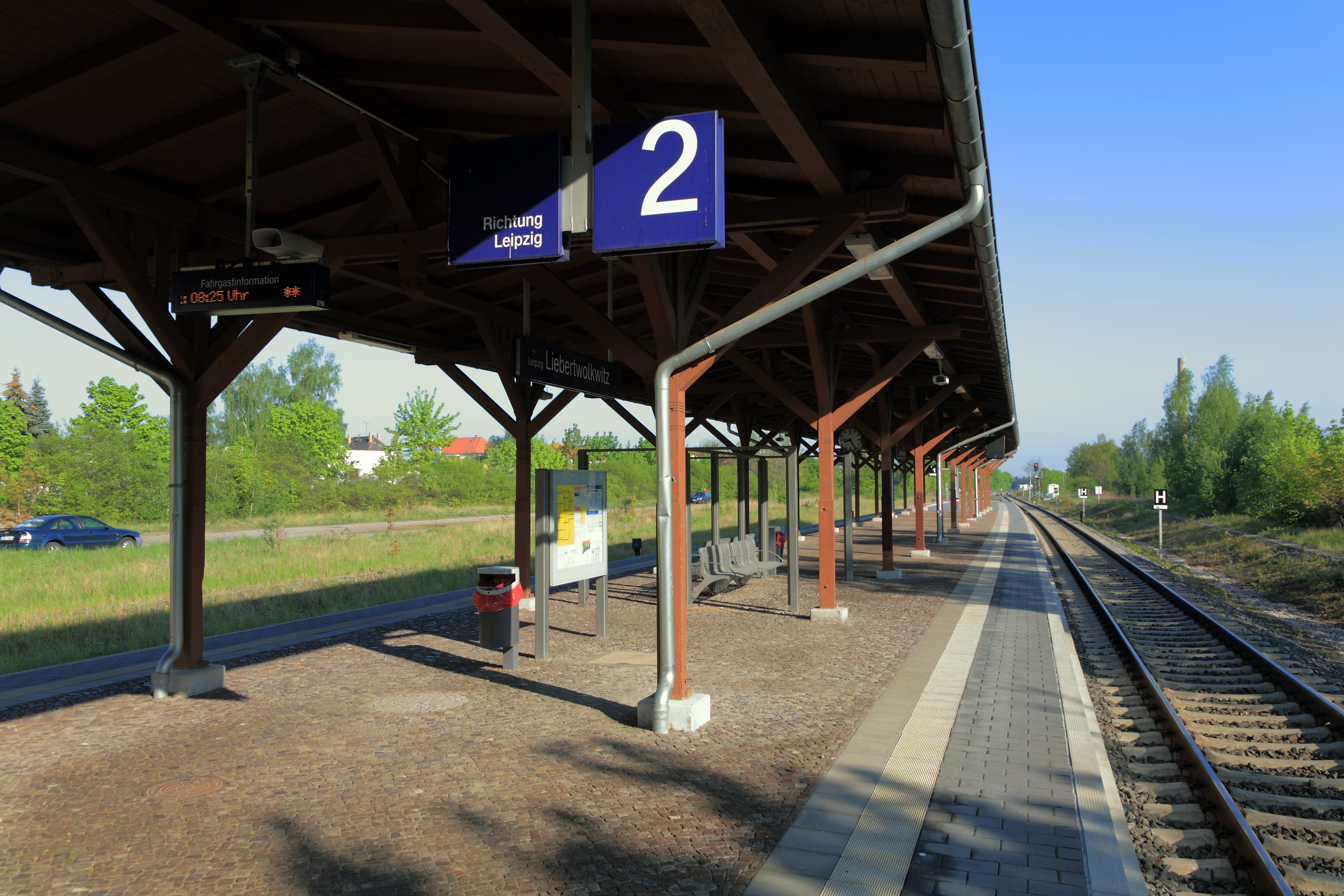
Leipzig-Liebertwolkwitz train station

The Leipzig-Liebertwolkwitz train station is located on the Leipzig–Geithain railway line, which is part of the long-distance connection from Leipzig to Chemnitz. The DB Regio Südost regional train line RB 113 runs from Liebertwolkwitz to Leipzig Hauptbahnhof and Geithain every hour.

Liebertwolkwitz is connected to several bus lines such as the 690 (Leipzig Hauptbahnhof-Grimma) or the 172 (Wachau - Sommerfeld / Borsdorf). The Nightliner N8 runs at night.

From 1928, a tram line ran between Liebertwolkwitz and Leipzig city centre. It was shortened to Leipzig-Meusdorf in 1971.

== Town twinning ==
Since 1996 Liebertwolkwitz has been twinned with Les Epesses, a small town in rural western France. In July 2005, a second charter was signed between the Pays des Herbiers and Leipzig-Liebertwolkwitz.

== Celebrities ==
- At the end of the seventeenth century the manor of Liebertwolkwitz was acquired by the Poet-Writer Heinrich Anselm von Ziegler und Kliphausen, who died here in 1697.
- The footballer René Adler was born in Liebertwolkwitz in 1985.
- The noted composer and Lutenist David Kellner was born in Liebertwolkwitz in 1670.
