= Muldentalkreis =

- District
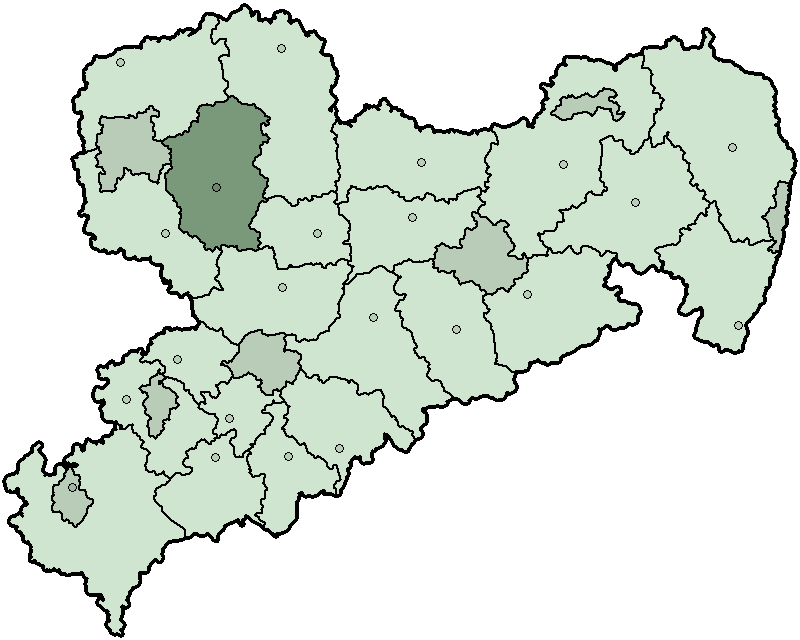
- Country: Germany
- State: Saxony
- Adm. region: Leipzig
- Disbanded: 2008-08-01
- Capital: Grimma

Area
  - Total: 892.62 km^{2} (344.64 sq mi)

Population (2001)
  - Total: 135,459
  - Density: 150/km^{2} (390/sq mi)
- Time zone: UTC+01:00 (CET)
  - Summer (DST): UTC+02:00 (CEST)
- Vehicle registration: MTL
- Website: www.lra-mtl.de

The Muldentalkreis (lit. 'Mulde Valley District') is a former district in Saxony, Germany. It was bounded by (from the north and clockwise) the districts Delitzsch, Torgau-Oschatz, Döbeln, Mittweida and Leipziger Land.

== History ==
The roots of the district date back to the Amt Grimma, which was formed in 1832 to 1838, and was later renamed Kreis (district). The city of Wurzen left the district 1926–1945 as a district-free city. In 1952 the area around Wurzen was split off from the district Grimma. This was reverted in 1994 when the two previous districts Grimma and Wurzen were merged again. A few municipalities from other districts around Bad Lausick were added as well. In August 2008, it became a part of the new district of Leipzig.

== Geography ==
The district is named after its major river, the Mulde – the name Muldental means valley of the Mulde. The Mulde is formed in the south of the district by its two confluents Freiberger Mulde and Zwickauer Mulde, and flows through the district in south-north direction.

== Coat of arms ==
The silver lines in the coat of arms symbolize the river Mulde and its two source arms. The green color symbolizes the forests of the district, and the three flower symbols stand for the two previous districts and the municipalities from other districts which were merged to form the current district.

== Towns and municipalities ==
Towns
1. Bad Lausick
2. Brandis
3. Colditz
4. Grimma
5. Mutzschen
6. Naunhof
7. Nerchau
8. Trebsen (Mulde)
9. Wurzen
Municipalities
1. Belgershain
2. Bennewitz
3. Borsdorf
4. Falkenhain
5. Großbothen
6. Hohburg
7. Machern
8. Otterwisch
9. Parthenstein
10. Zschadraß
11. Thallwitz
12. Thümmlitzwalde
