= Lossa (Mulde) =

River in Germany

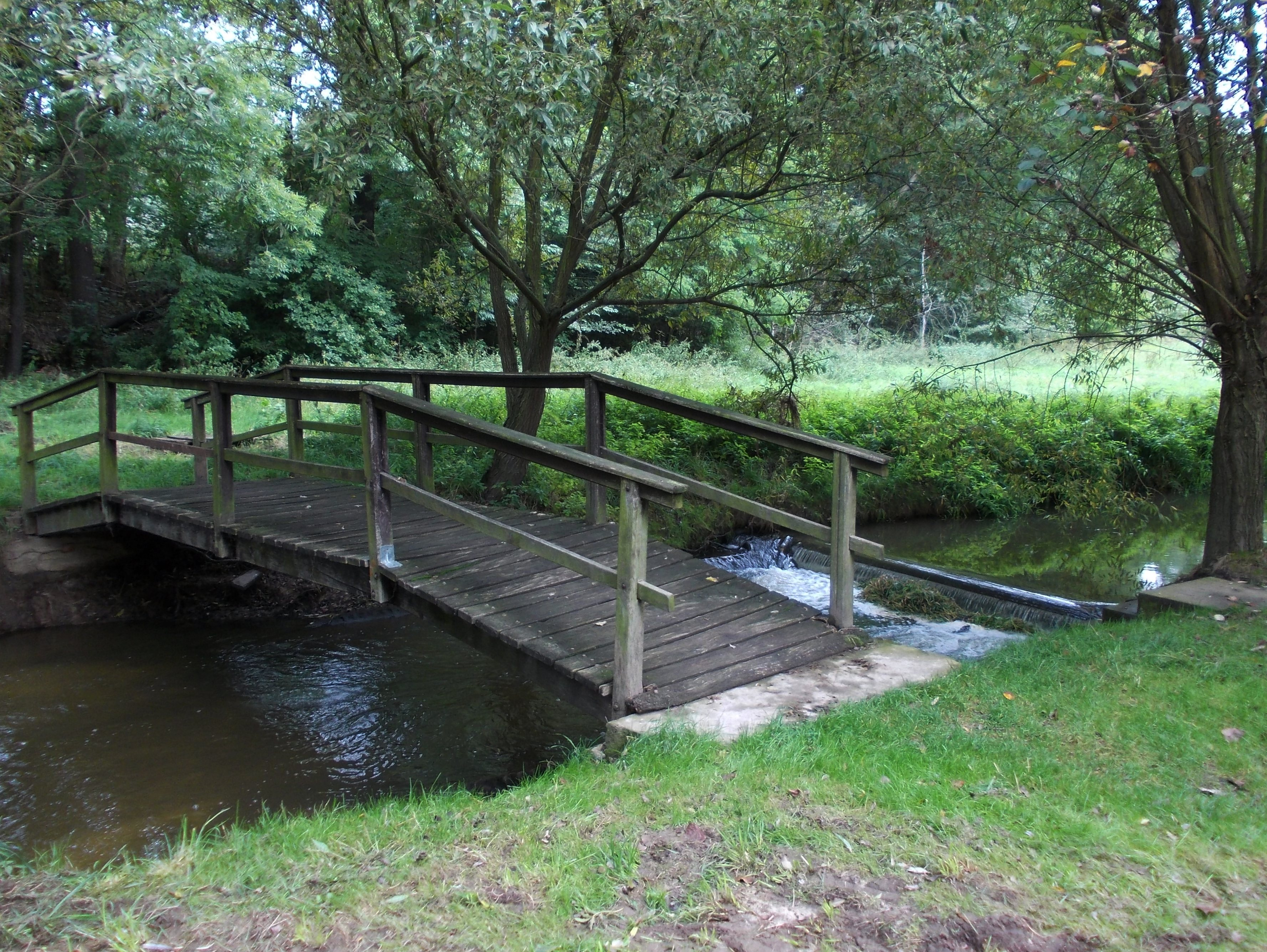
- Bridge over the Lossa at Lossaer Schloß (Thallwitz)

Location
- Country: Germany
- State: Saxony
- Reference no.: DE: 5492

Physical characteristics
- Source
  - location: near Falkenhain (confluence of its headstreams)
  - coordinates: 51°22′43″N 12°54′19″E
- Mouth
  - location: south of Eilenburg into the Mulde
  - coordinates: 51°27′12″N 12°39′06″E
- Length: 21 km (13 mi)
- Basin size: 153 km^{2} (59 sq mi)

Basin features
- Progression: Mulde→ Elbe→ North Sea
- River system: Elbe
- Landmarks: Small towns: Wurzen, Belgern-Schildau, Eilenburg

The Lossa (German pronunciation: [ˈlɔsa]) is a small river in Saxony, Germany. It is a tributary of the Mulde.

== Course ==
The Lossa rises east of the Wurzen village of Kühren. The Lossabach, a tributary of the Lossa, has its origin east of the village of Ochsensaal (which belongs to Dahlen). In the vicinity of the Lossatal village of Müglenz the Lossabach empties into the Lossa. The Lossa then continues northwest through Hohburg, past the southern side of the Hohburg Hills, through the eponymous village of Lossa (a district of Thallwitz) and through Thallwitz. Just south of Eilenburg the stream discharges into the Mulde. Originally it joined the main river several hundred metres further north, but due to the construction of the German Celluloid Factory in Eilenburg, it was diverted into the Mulde just before entering the town borough in the second half of the 19th century.

In Thallwitz the stream is impounded by a small weir to form a pond, the Herrenteich.

== See also ==
- List of rivers of Saxony
