= Hohburg Hills =

Hill range of Germany

- Location within Saxony Location within Germany

Highest point
- Peak: Löbenberg
- Elevation: 240.0 m (787.4 ft)
- Coordinates: 51°26′N 12°48′E

Geography
- Location: Hohburg, Nordsachsen, Lossatal, Saxony, Germany

The Hohburg Hills (German: Hohburger Berge), also called Hohburg Switzerland (Hohburger Schweiz), are located in the district of Nordsachsen near the eponymous village of Hohburg in the municipality of Lossatal in the German state of Saxony.

== Geography ==
These quartz-porphyry hills rise prominently up to 120 metres out of the surround plain of the Leipzig Bay, east of the River Mulde. Their highest point is the Löbenberg at (240 m above sea level (NN)). Other high points are the Gaudlitzberg (219 m above NN), the Burzelberg (217 m above NN) and the Galgenberg ("Gallows Hill", 213 m above NN). South of Hohburg is the Kleine Berg ("Little Hill") with a height of 206 m above NN.

In the valley lying amongst the Hohburg Hills, the stream of the Lossabach flows through Müglenz, Hohburg, Klein- and Großzschepa to empty into the Mulde near Thallwitz.

== History ==
The Hohburg Hills were shaped by decades of intensive stone quarrying. This produced steep rock faces and several lakes in the hollows that were left behind. The rock faces, up to forty meters high, have been used for climbing since 1925. Climbers from the area, such as Felix Simon, made use of the terrain as a training ground for the Alps. Many of the climbs used in those days fell victim to ongoing quarry operations. From 1965, the Schwarze Wand ("Black Wall") has been used for Alpine training (aid climbing). Since the mid-1990s, many, new, very difficult routes have emerged as part of a further wave of development. Currently, there are over 500 climbing routes in various quarries.

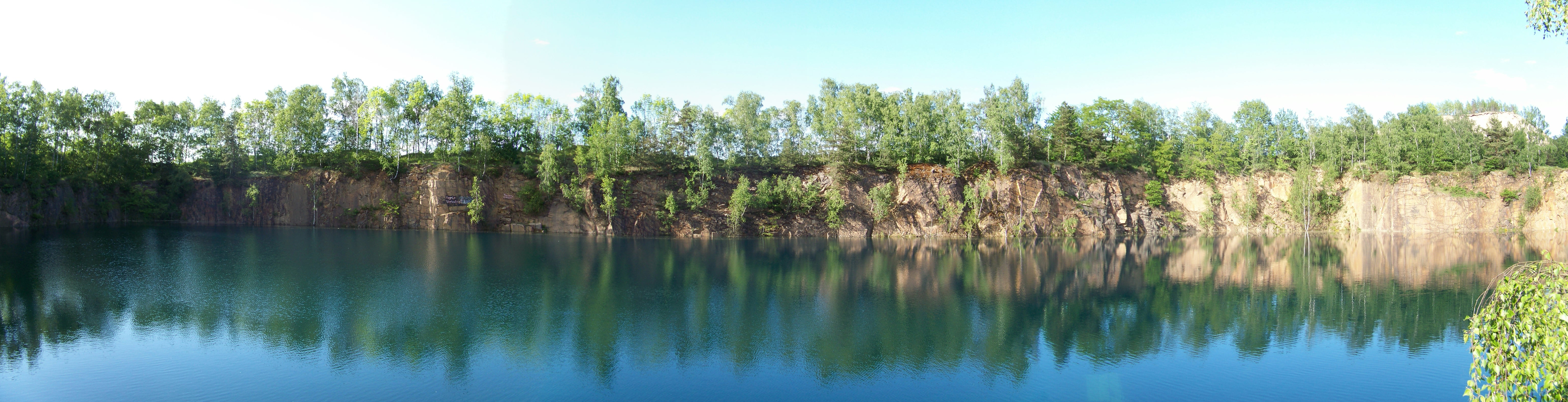
Lake formed as a result of quartz porphyry quarrying near Hohburg
