= Friedbert =

Friedbert is a given name. Notable people with the given name include:

- Friedbert Grams (1942–2022), German politician
- Friedbert Pflüger (born 1955), German politician
- Friedbert Streller (1931–2017), German musicologist and composer
