= Lossa =

Lossa can refer to:

- Lossa, Finne, a village in Saxony-Anhalt, Germany
- Lossa, Thalwitz, a village in Saxony, Germany
- Lossa (Mulde), a river of Saxony, Germany, tributary of the Mulde
- Lossa (Unstrut), a river of Saxony-Anhalt and Thuringia, Germany, tributary of the Unstrut
- Lossa Engineering, a motorcycle manufacturer in California
