= Kühren-Burkartshain =

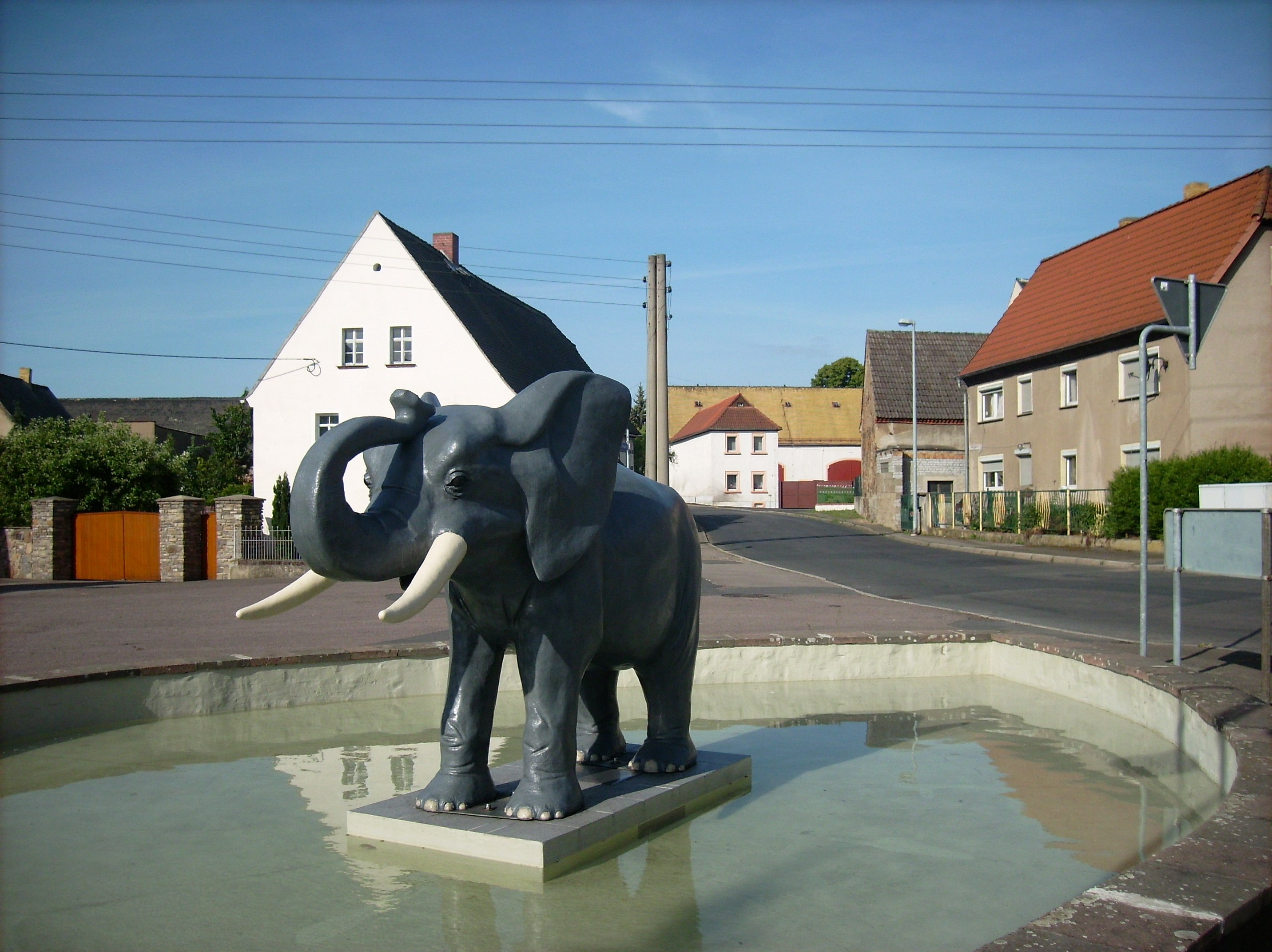

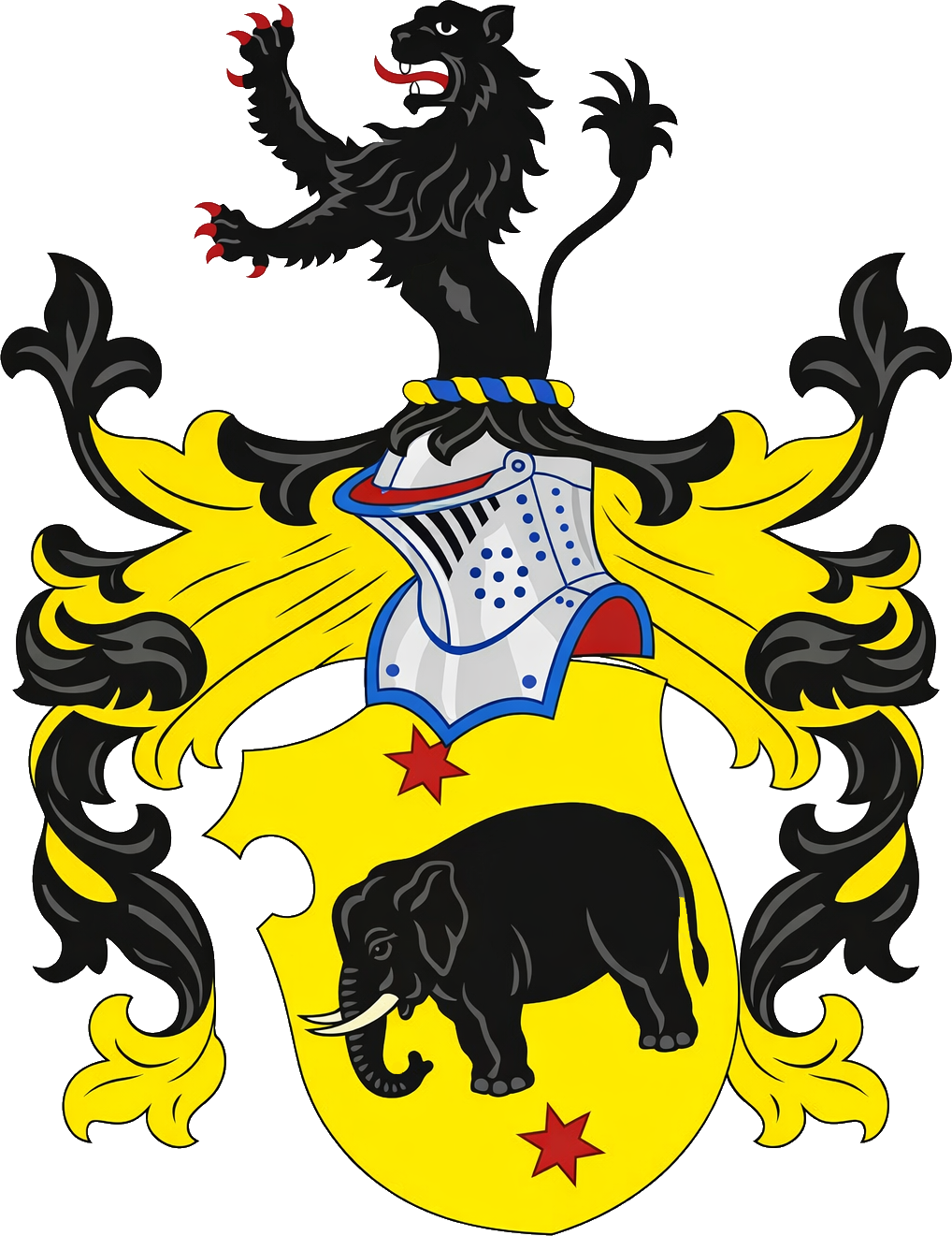
- Coat of arms
- Interactive map of Kühren-Burkartshain
- Location within Germany Location within Saxony
- Coordinates: 51°20′N 12°50′E
- Country: Germany
- State: Saxony
- District: Leipzig
- Disbanded: 1 October 2006

Population (2006)
  - Total: 2,846
- Time zone: UTC+01:00 (CET)
  - Summer (DST): UTC+02:00 (CEST)

Kühren-Burkartshain is a former municipality in the former district Muldentalkreis, Saxony. It was formed in 1994 by the merger of the municipalities Kühren and Burkartshain. In October 2006, it was merged into the town Wurzen.
