= Streller =

Streller is a surname. Notable people with the surname include:

- Friedbert Streller (1931–2017), German composer
- Marco Streller (born 1981), Swiss footballer
