= Bennewitz =

- Municipality
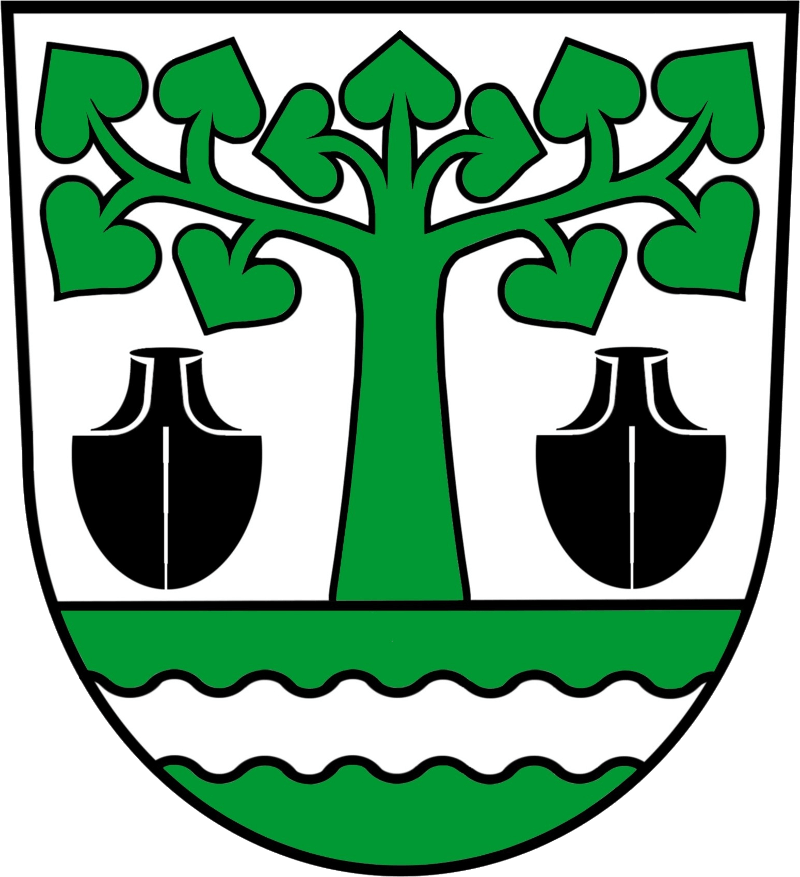
- Coat of arms

- Location of Bennewitz within Leipzig district
- Interactive map of Bennewitz
- Location within Germany Location within Saxony
- Coordinates: 51°21′35″N 12°42′41″E
- Country: Germany
- State: Saxony
- District: Leipzig
- Subdivisions: 12

Government
  - Mayor (2020–27): Bernd Laqua

Area
  - Total: 46.42 km^{2} (17.92 sq mi)
- Elevation: 117 m (384 ft)

Population (2025-12-31)
  - Total: 5,102
  - Density: 109.9/km^{2} (284.7/sq mi)
- Time zone: UTC+01:00 (CET)
  - Summer (DST): UTC+02:00 (CEST)
- Postal codes: 04828
- Dialling codes: 03425
- Vehicle registration: L
- Website: www.gemeinde-bennewitz.de

Bennewitz is a municipality in the Leipzig district in Saxony, Germany.

== History ==
Today Bennewitz is a cluster of several villages administered by Bennewitz village. The main village of Bennewitz is one of the oldest settlements in the Mulde-valley. It is probably named after Bono or Bonislaw who settled here about 1200 years ago. The name is of Sorbian (see: Wends) origin, as many geographical names in the area. Its old village core has the shape of a typical Sorbian (Wendish) 'Rundling' village.

== Transport ==
Bennewitz is situated at the intersection of highway B6 and highway B107. The former connects it with the metropolitan area of Leipzig. The village has a train station which is served by local commuter trains.
