= Franz von Fleischer =

German botanist (1801–1878)

Franz von Fleischer (27 November 1801, in Lausick – 24 August 1878, in Hohenheim) was a German botanist.

As a young man, he worked as a pharmacist in Dresden and Esslingen. In 1825 he undertook a botanical study trip to the Alps, followed by an extended scientific expedition in 1826/27 that took him to Illyria, Istria, Greece, Asia Minor, Syria and Egypt. The collections were partly distributed by the German scientific society Unio Itineraria as exsiccata-like series. Afterwards, he studied medicine and natural sciences at the University of Tübingen, and following graduation in 1832, he worked as a teacher of natural sciences at the Hofwyl agricultural school in the canton of Bern.

From 1834 to 1840 he taught classes in natural sciences at the cantonal school in Aarau, and afterwards, served as a professor at the Agricultural Academy in Hohenheim. He remained at Hohenheim up until his death in 1878.

Some plants with the specific epithet of fleischeri commemorate his name, an example being Crocus fleischeri.

== Selected works ==
- Über die Riedgräser Würtembergs, mit besonderer Berücksichtigung der in der Flora von Tübingen einheimischen, 1832 – On the sedges of Württemberg, etc.
- Beiträge zur Lehre von dem Keimen der Samen der Gewächse, insbesondere der Samen ökonomischer Pflanzen, 1851 – Contributions to the theory of germination of seeds, especially seeds of economic plants.
- Ueber Missbildungen verschiedener Culturpflanzen und einiger anderer landwirthschaftlichen Gewächse, 1862 – On malformations of various cultivated plants, etc.
