= Herbert Albert =

German conductor (1903–1973)

Herbert Albert (26 December 1903 – 15 September 1973) was a German conductor.

Albert was born in Bad Lausick and died in Bad Reichenhall. After studying with Karl Muck as a pianist he later held a succession of music director positions. In 1933, he was appointed First Municipal Kapellmeister in Baden-Baden, where he established the International Contemporary Music Festival, which premiered in 1936. In 1937, he became general music director of the Stuttgart State Opera, and in 1944, he moved to the Breslau Opera.

From 1946 to 1948 he was principal conductor of the Leipzig Gewandhaus Orchestra. In 1947, he conducted the premiere of Boris Blacher's Orchestral Variations on a Theme by Paganini. He held further positions in Graz and Mannheim, and remained in the West. From 1950 to 1952, he served as general music director in Graz, and from 1952 to 1963, he served at the Mannheim National Theatre, whose new building opened on January 13, 1957, with Weber's Der Freischütz performed under his direction.

From 1963, Albert, an excellent pianist, frequently took the solo part in piano concertos and conducted the orchestra from the grand piano.

== Bibliography ==
- Herbert Albert, in:Author=Paul Frank, Wilhelm Altmann; "Kurzgefassendes Tonkünstlerlexikon" Edition=14, Publisher=Gustav Bosse Verlag, Regensburg, 1936, Pages=718
- Fred K. Prieberg: Handbook of German Musicians 1933–1945. CD-ROM Encyclopedia, Kiel 2009, 2nd edition, pp. 117–119. online
- Otto Renkhoff: Nassau Biography. Short Biographies from 13 Centuries. 2nd edition. Wiesbaden 1992. ISBN 3-922244-90-4, p. 7, no. 35.
