= Trebsen =

Town in the Leipzig district in Saxony, Germany

- Town
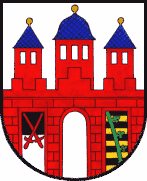
- Coat of arms

- Location of Trebsen within Leipzig district
- Interactive map of Trebsen
- Location within Germany Location within Saxony
- Coordinates: 51°17′N 12°45′E
- Country: Germany
- State: Saxony
- District: Leipzig
- Subdivisions: 4

Government
  - Mayor (2022–29): Stefan Müller (CDU)

Area
  - Total: 35.03 km^{2} (13.53 sq mi)
- Elevation: 122 m (400 ft)

Population (2025-12-31)
  - Total: 3,726
  - Density: 106.4/km^{2} (275.5/sq mi)
- Time zone: UTC+01:00 (CET)
  - Summer (DST): UTC+02:00 (CEST)
- Postal codes: 04687
- Dialling codes: 034383 and 03437
- Vehicle registration: L, BNA, GHA, GRM, MTL, WUR
- Website: www.trebsen.de

Trebsen (German pronunciation: [ˈtʁeːpsn̩]) is a town in the Leipzig district, in Saxony, Germany. It is situated on the river Mulde, 6 km northeast of Grimma, and 27 km east of Leipzig (centre).

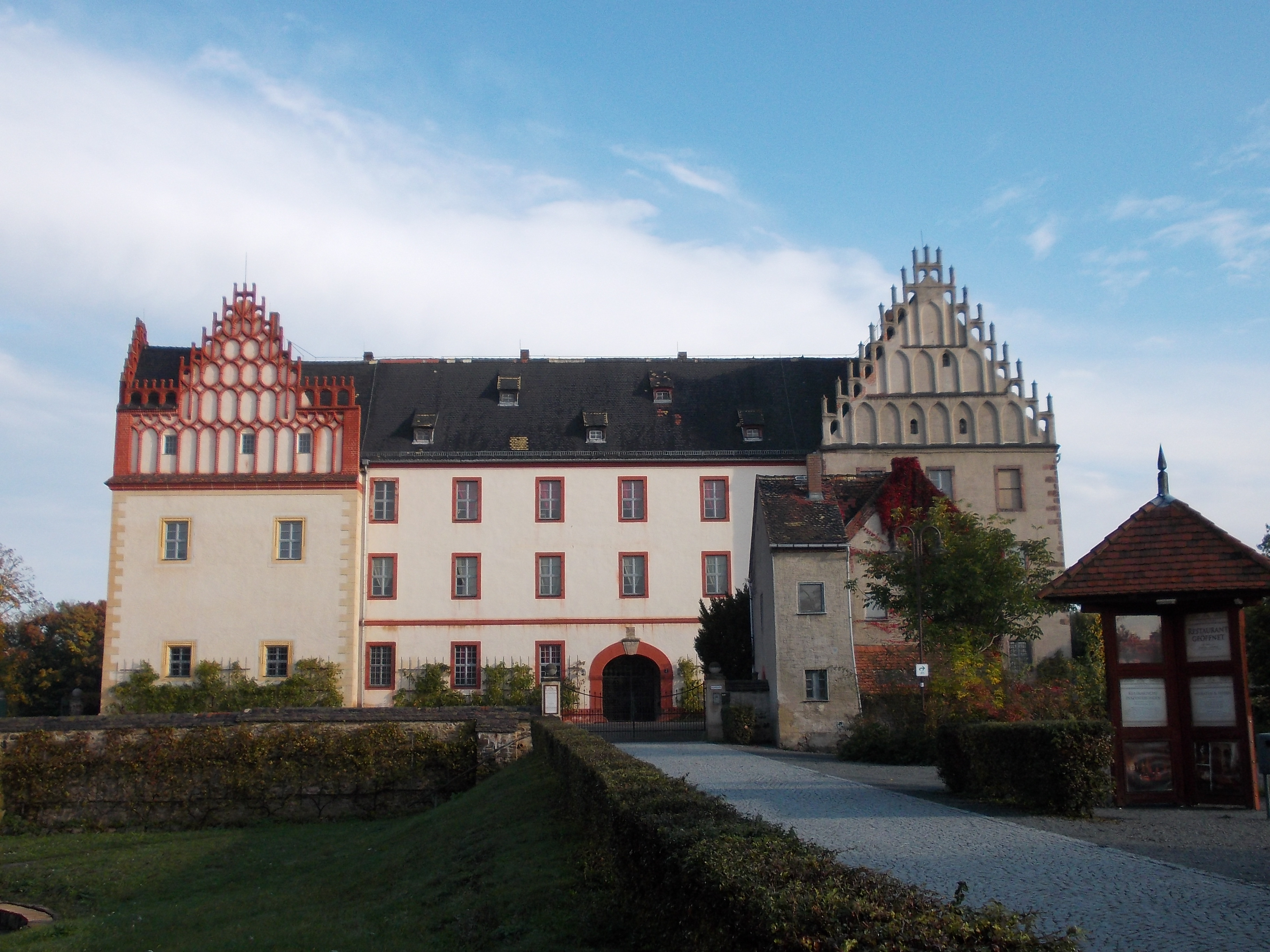
Trebsen castle

== Mayors ==
In June 2015 Stefan Müller was elected the new mayor. Before S. Müller, Heidemarie Kolbe was 25 years in office.
