= Bad Lausick =

- Town
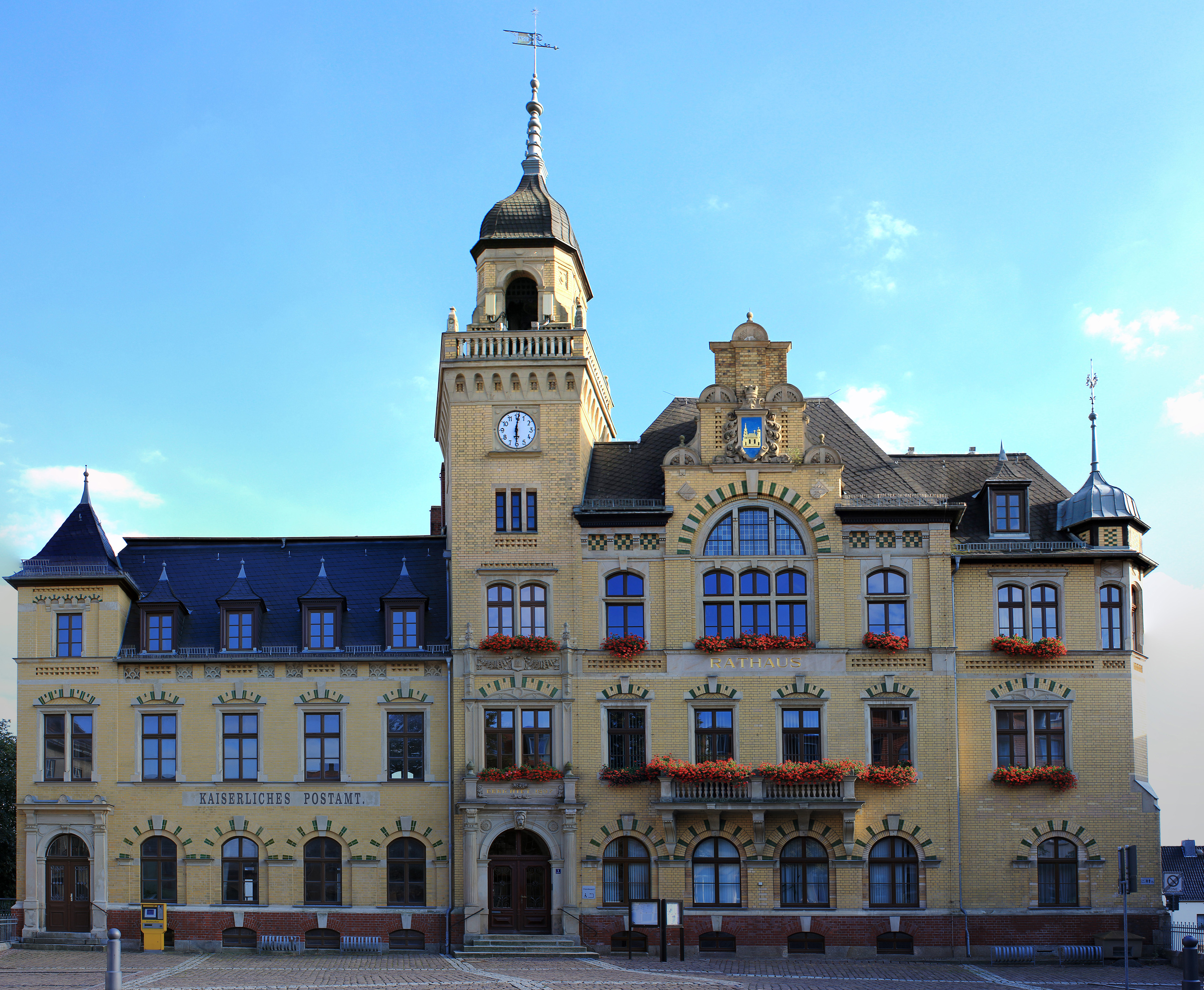
- Town hall, built in 1897

- Coat of arms

- Location of Bad Lausick within Leipzig district
- Interactive map of Bad Lausick
- Location within Germany Location within Saxony
- Coordinates: 51°8′41″N 12°38′43″E
- Country: Germany
- State: Saxony
- District: Leipzig
- Subdivisions: 12

Government
  - Mayor (2022–29): Michael Hultsch

Area
  - Total: 70.03 km^{2} (27.04 sq mi)
- Elevation: 164 m (538 ft)

Population (2025-12-31)
  - Total: 8,007
  - Density: 114.3/km^{2} (296.1/sq mi)
- Time zone: UTC+01:00 (CET)
  - Summer (DST): UTC+02:00 (CEST)
- Postal codes: 04651
- Dialling codes: 034345
- Vehicle registration: L, BNA, GHA, GRM, MTL, WUR
- Website: www.bad-lausick.de

Bad Lausick (German: [ˈbaːt ˈlaʊzɪk]) is a town in the Leipzig district, in Saxony, Germany. It is situated 12 km southwest of Grimma, and 29 km southeast of Leipzig.

== History ==
=== Middle Ages to 18th century ===
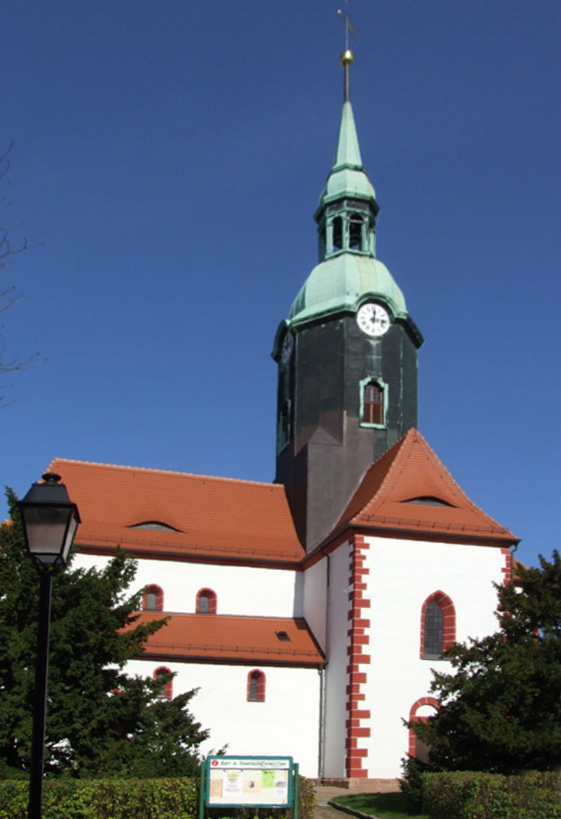
St. Kilian's Church

In 1096 Bad Lausick was mentioned for the first time as Luzke. In later documents the names Luzic (1181), Luzich (1219) and Lußigk (1414) were used. In 1497 the place was described as Laussigk for the first time.

In 1106 the construction of the St. Kilian church was begun under the supervision of Pegau monastery, which like the church had been founded by Wiprecht von Groitzsch. It is known as the oldest preserved church in Saxony. In 1158 Luzeche was mentioned as a fortified place with market rights. Following the Treaty of Leipzig, Laussigk became part of the Duchy of Saxe-Wittenberg.

A school started work in 1529. In 1605 the place was awarded town privileges, but was destroyed in a fire in the same year. More fires causing major damages occurred in 1649, 1667, 1693, and 1719. During the Thirty Years' War the plague caused the death of the larger part of the population in 1633. The old schoolhouse near the church was first mentioned in 1736. In 1739 the old town hall and the current church tower were built. A crop failure in 1772 caused a famine in the town.

=== 19th century ===
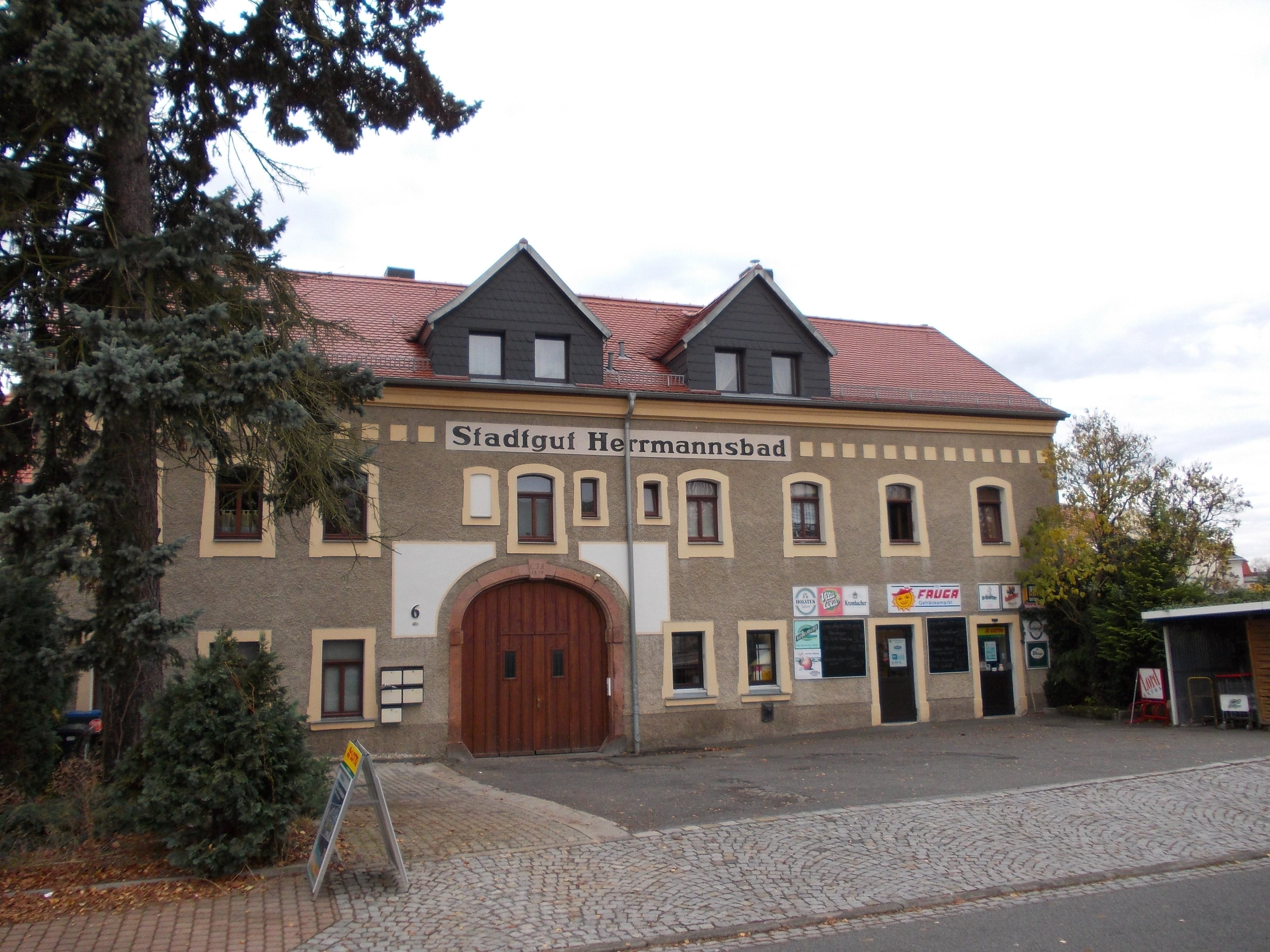
Hermannsbad estate

Lignite mining in the vicinity of the town started in 1813, supplying fuel for lime kilns. In the course of the mining operations, a medicinal spring was discovered in 1820. One year later, the first spa opened, named Hermannsbad after its founder. In 1840 a new school with four classrooms and four teachers' quarters was built, serving 500 pupils. 1878 can be considered as the zenith of the lignite mining and lime burning industries, with 36 pits and 20 kilns in Köllsdorf alone. In 1882 the spa was acquired by the town, and textile merchant Johann Gottfried Becker established his business in the town centre. Construction of the Bürgerschule (civic school) for 900 pupils started in 1886, and in 1887 the Leipzig–Geithain railway via Lausick opened. A fire in the town hall in 1890 destroyed a large inventory of documents. 25 felt-making businesses in the town in 1890 signified the heyday of this industry. At this time, there were also 11 lignite mines, five lime kilns, 30 agricultural businesses, 20 bakers, 25 shoemakers, 25 tailors, 17 weavers, 10 butchers and 43 other craftsman's establishments as well as 23 restaurants and inns. Starting around 1895, clay processing developed and gave later rise to the silicate factory. A new town hall and a post office were built in 1897, and a court of law in 1898.

=== 20th century ===
In 1913, after almost 100 years of spa operations, the town was awarded the title Bad Lausick. In 1920 construction of the eastern section of the Borna–Großbothen railway, known as Querbahn, started. The spa was modernised in 1928, and Bad Lausick became a popular health resort. In 1935, Reichersdorf and Heinersdorf were incorporated into the town. The western part of the Borna–Großbothen railway opened in 1937, allowing through trains from October of that year on. From 1939 to 1945 a Wehrmacht hospital operated on the Hermannsbad premises. During World War II, the town was spared from aerial attacks and did not suffer from destructions. The Querbahn railway line was dismantled for war reparations in 1948.

From 1951 on Bad Lausick was part of Geithain district and became the seat of the district court of law. In 1956 a rural department store (Landwarenhaus) opened on the market square, and in 1957 the romanic character of St Kilian church was restored. A Silbermann organ dating from 1722 and extended by Johann Gottlob Trampeli was installed in the church at the same time. Based on a document by Emperor Frederick Barbarossa, the town celebrated its 800th anniversary in 1958. The spa was modernised again until 1962 and became a specialist sanatorium for cardiac and circulatory disorders in 1972. Former enterprises with state holdings were fully nationalized by that time, in particular the house shoe factory and the mill works. The school was extended in 1967/1968. The agricultural cooperatives of Bad Lausick, Ballendorf, Buchheim, and Ebersbach merged in 1976. The silicate works were modernised and expanded between 1979 and 1988, and in 1988 construction of a new town quarter was started as a major public housing project.

Demonstrations, round tables, and council meetings during the times of the political changeover in the GDR resulted in the admission of members of Neues Forum and Social Democrats to the town council. In 1990, Bad Lausick became twinned with Baunach in Upper Franconia. In 1994, Bad Lausick and its surroundings were transferred into the new district Muldentalkreis.

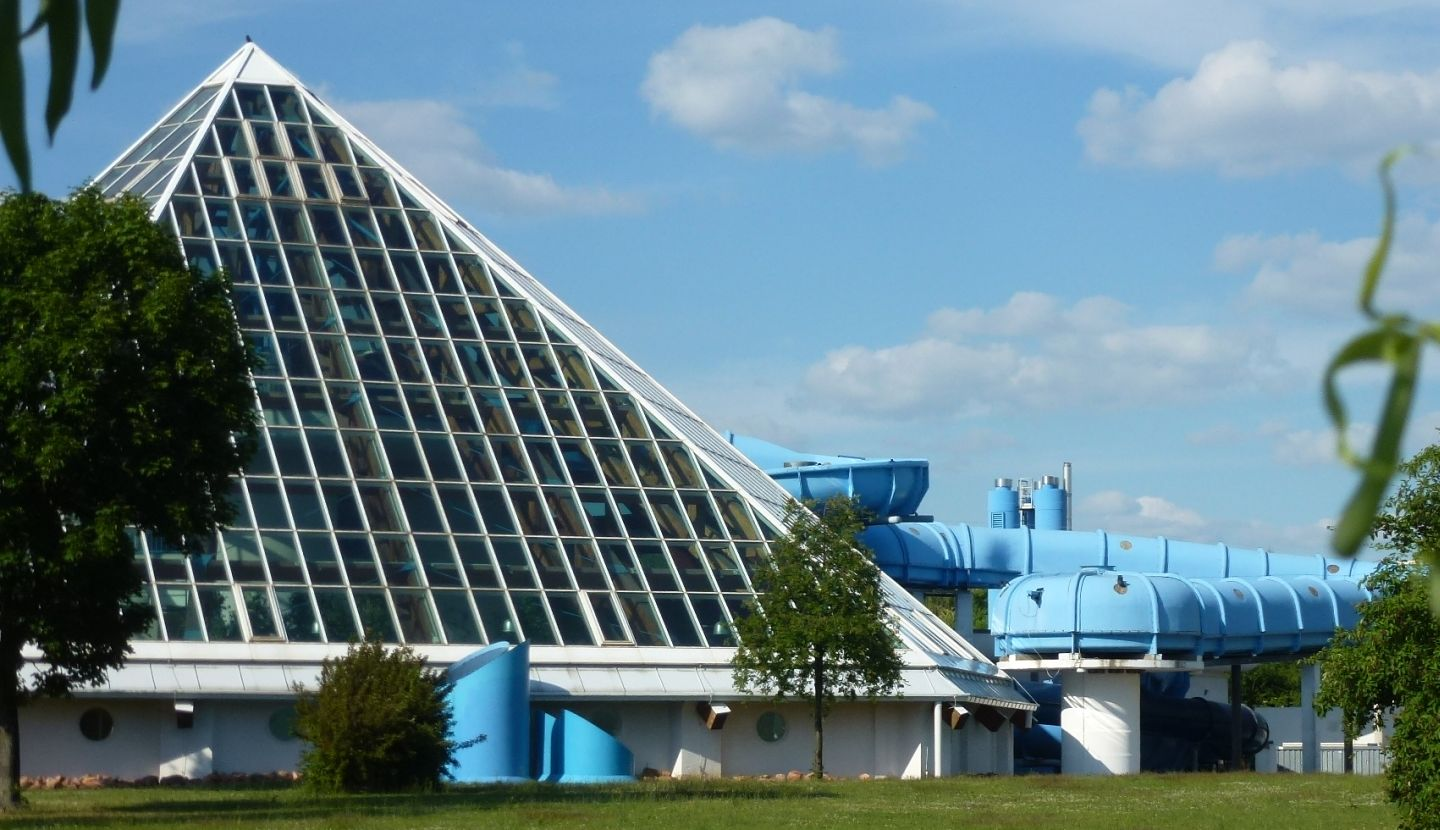
Leisure baths Riff

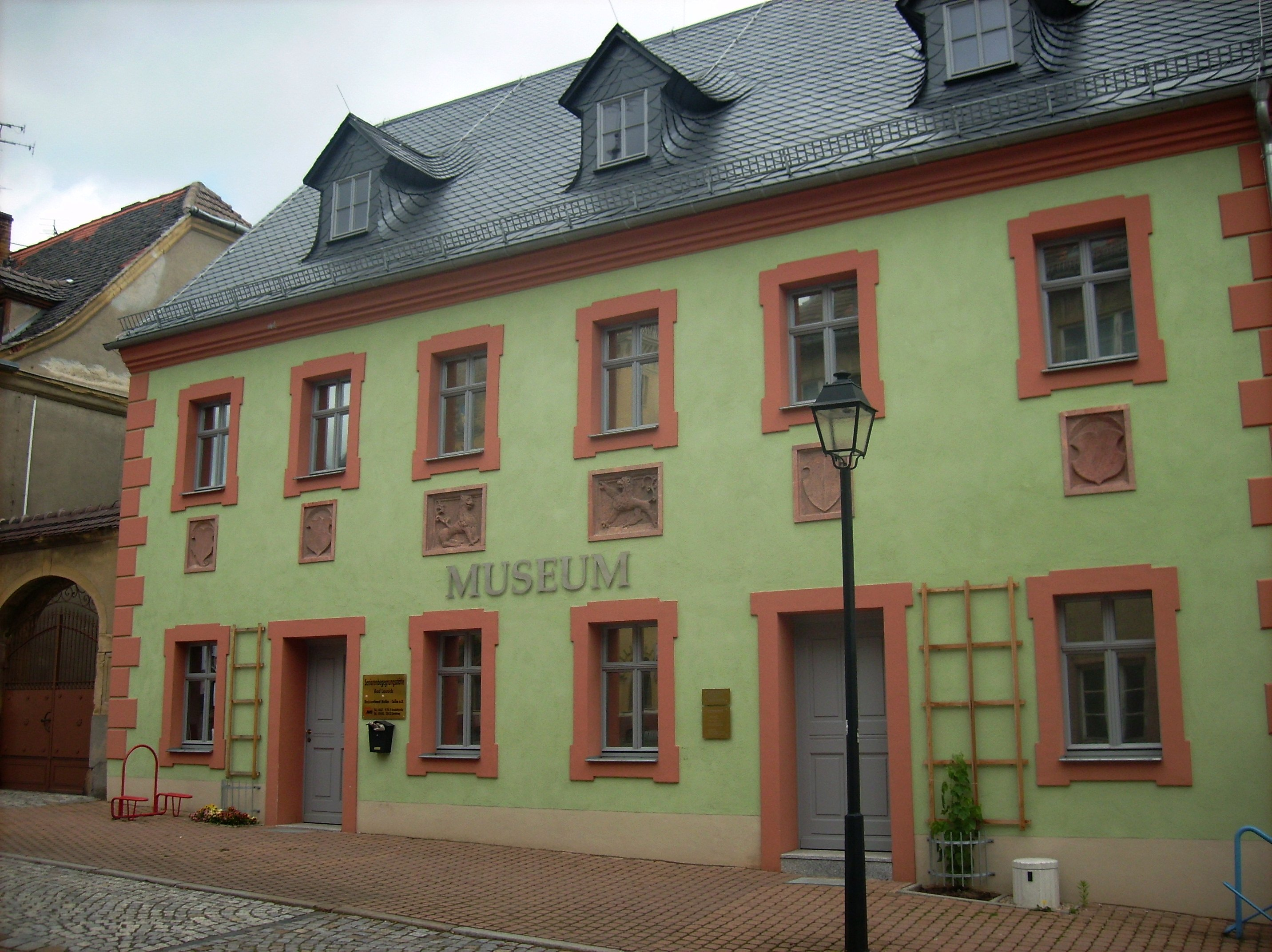
Local museum

A new spa building, a hotel, and the spa and leisure baths Riff were opened in 1995. The 900th anniversary of the first documentary mention of the town was celebrated in 1996, and a new thermal spring was drilled in 1998. Spa operations are the main economic activity in Bad Lausick now. The neighbouring villages Steinbach, Beucha, Kleinbeucha, and Stockheim were incorporated into Bad Lausick in 1999. The spa and town museum opened in 2008, and in 2010 the town was officially rated as Heilbad. Bad Lausick together with Muldentalkreis district joined the new district Landkreis Leipzig in 2008.

=== Population Development ===
Year	Inhabitants
1697	500
1790	816
1867	3,456
1890	3,977
1925	3,823
1935	5,083
1939	5,398
1958	7,449
2007	8,754
2009	8,509
2010	8,486
2013	8,133

== Economy ==
Spa operations and health care are the main economic activities. The Hermannsbad spa was opened in 1821 and developed into a sanatorium for cardiac and circulatory disorders. It was named Hermannsbadklinik in 1989. The old spa building was replaced by 1995. In 1993 two private rehabilitation clinics opened, of which Median Klinik specialises in the treatment of cardiac and circulatory disorders and orthopedic complaints, while Sachsenklinik specialises in orthopedics, neurology, and psychosomatic medicine.

Further, mostly medium-sized enterprises include the manufacturing of steel furniture and of surgical dressing materials, cleaning contractors, and businesses in engineering construction (namely of pipework and of solar energy plants).

== Education, culture and sports ==
The secondary school, named after the antifascist Werner Seelenbinder, occupies the schoolhouse opened in 1886. A primary school was established in 1992 in a modern building erected in the second half of the 20th century. A vocational training establishment is present in the town with the Evangelische Schule für Sozialwesen (Evangelical School for Social Welfare) "Luise Höpfner", founded in 1953.

Deutsche Bläserakademie, an educational institution specialising in wind instrument music and Sächsische Bläserphilharmonie, Germany's only symphonic concert band, are based in Bad Lausick.

Several members of the powerlifting club KSV Bad Lausick e.V., founded in 1982 and organising multiple yearly competitions, have also advanced to the national sports team in this discipline.

== Images ==
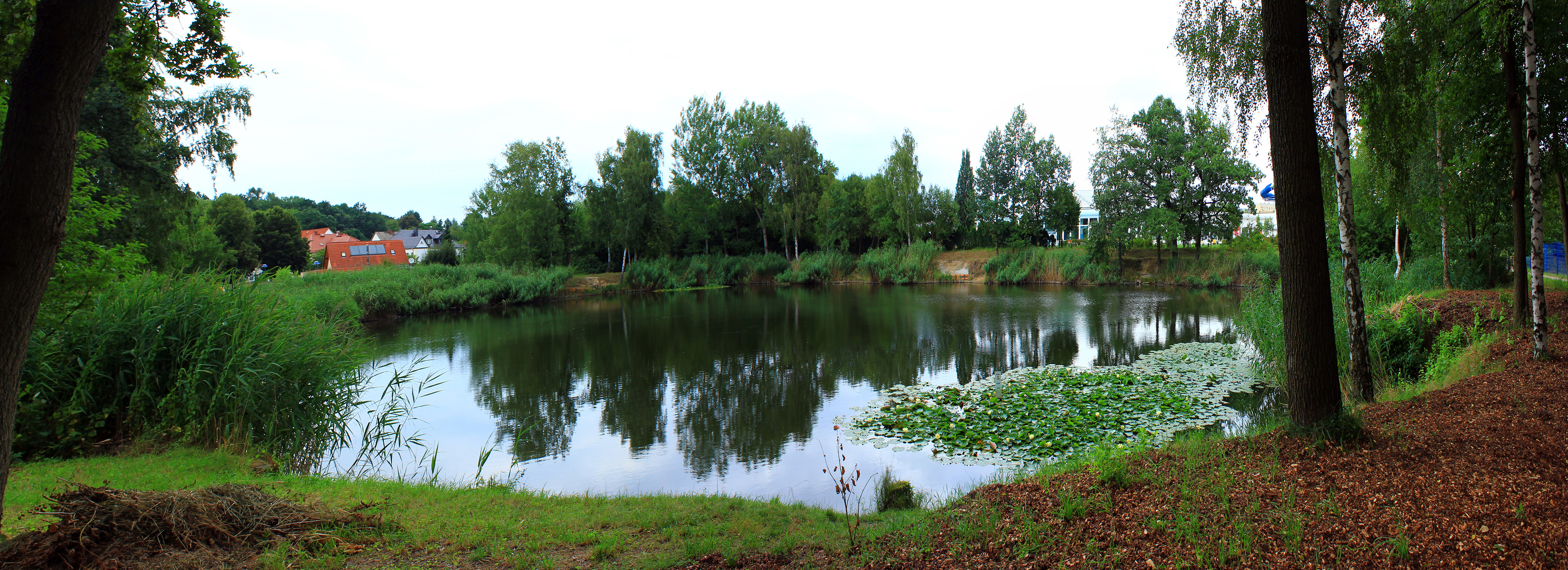
Former clay pit

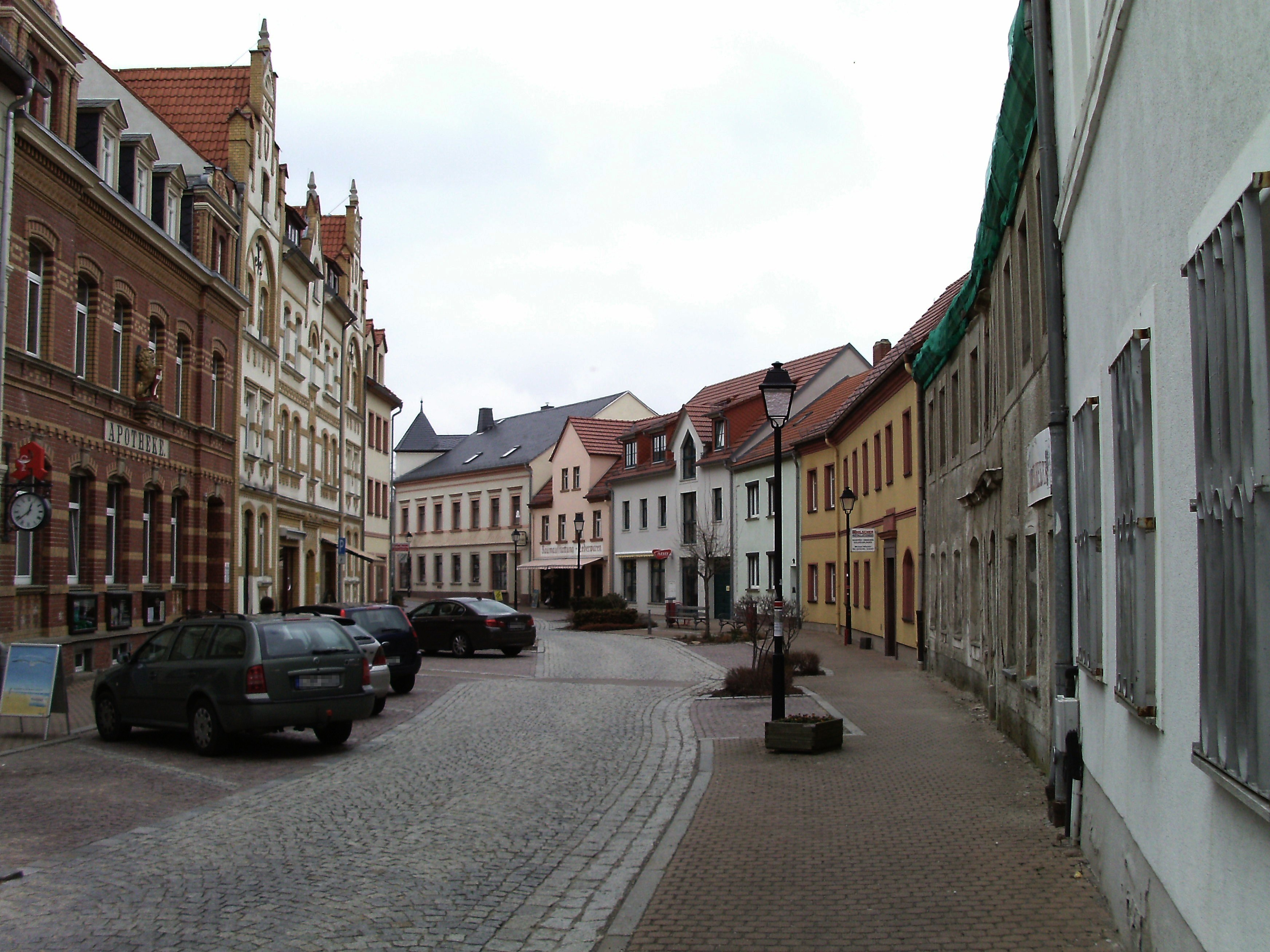
Straße der Einheit, town centre

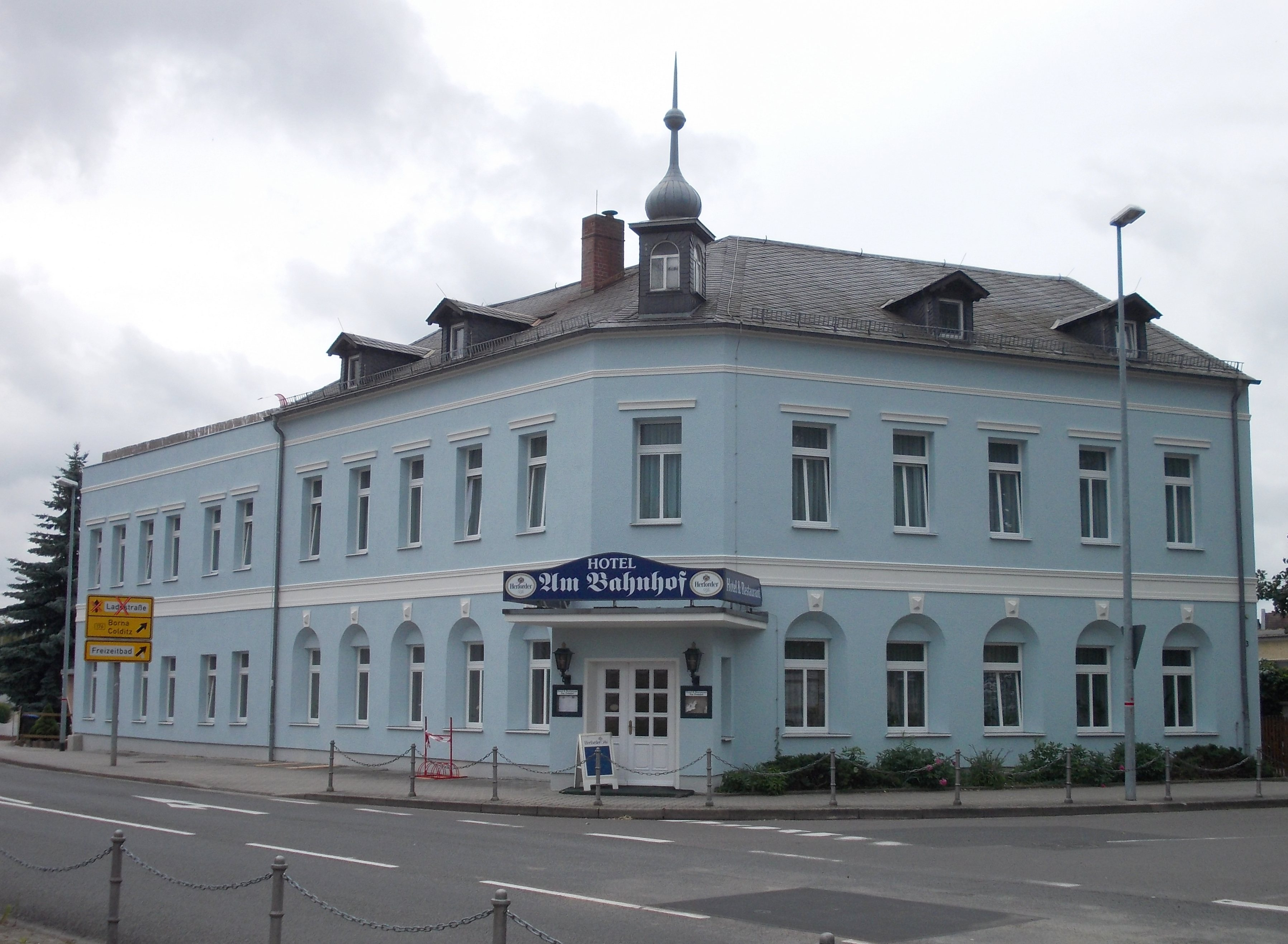
Bahnhofshotel (Railway Hotel)

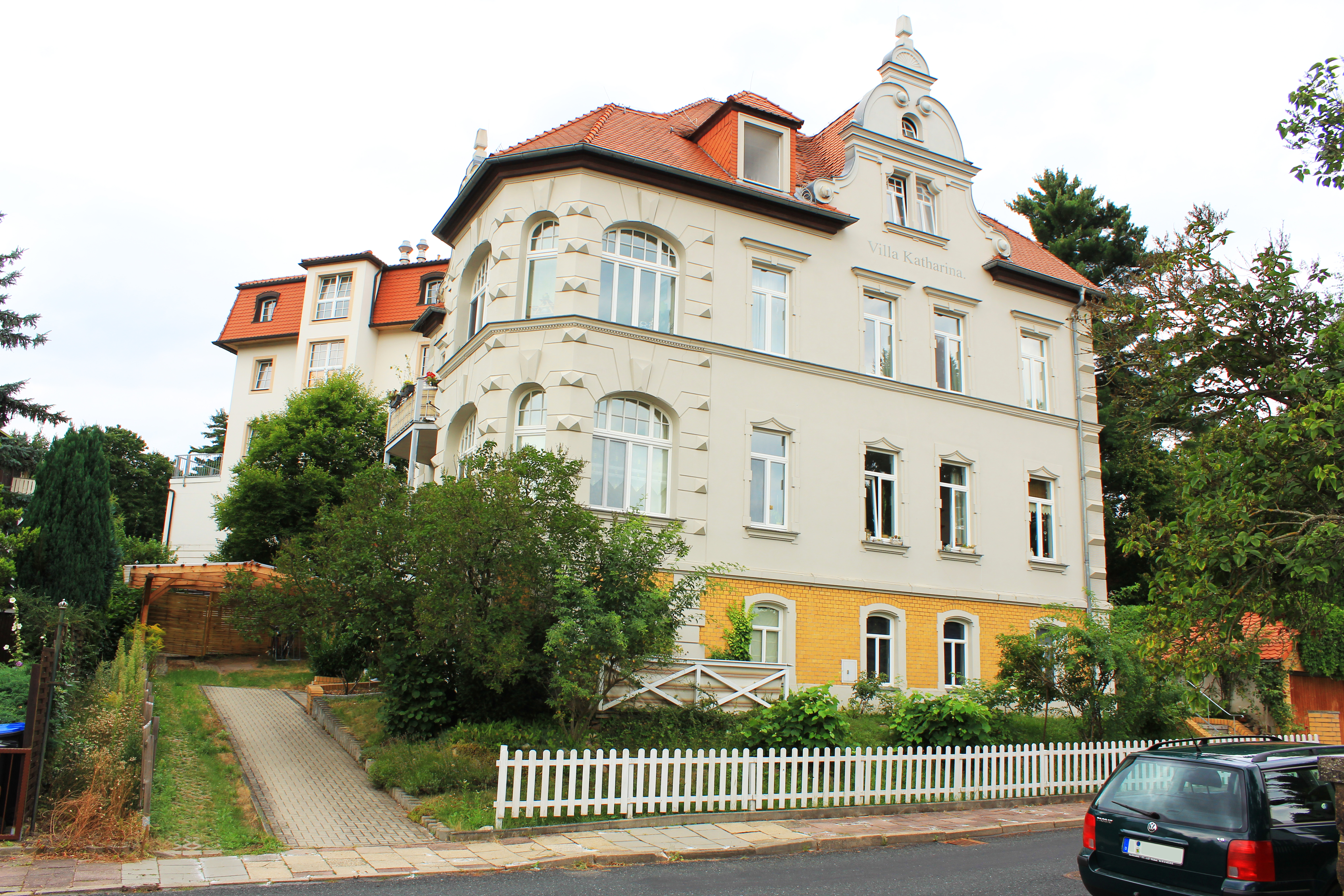
Villa in the spa district

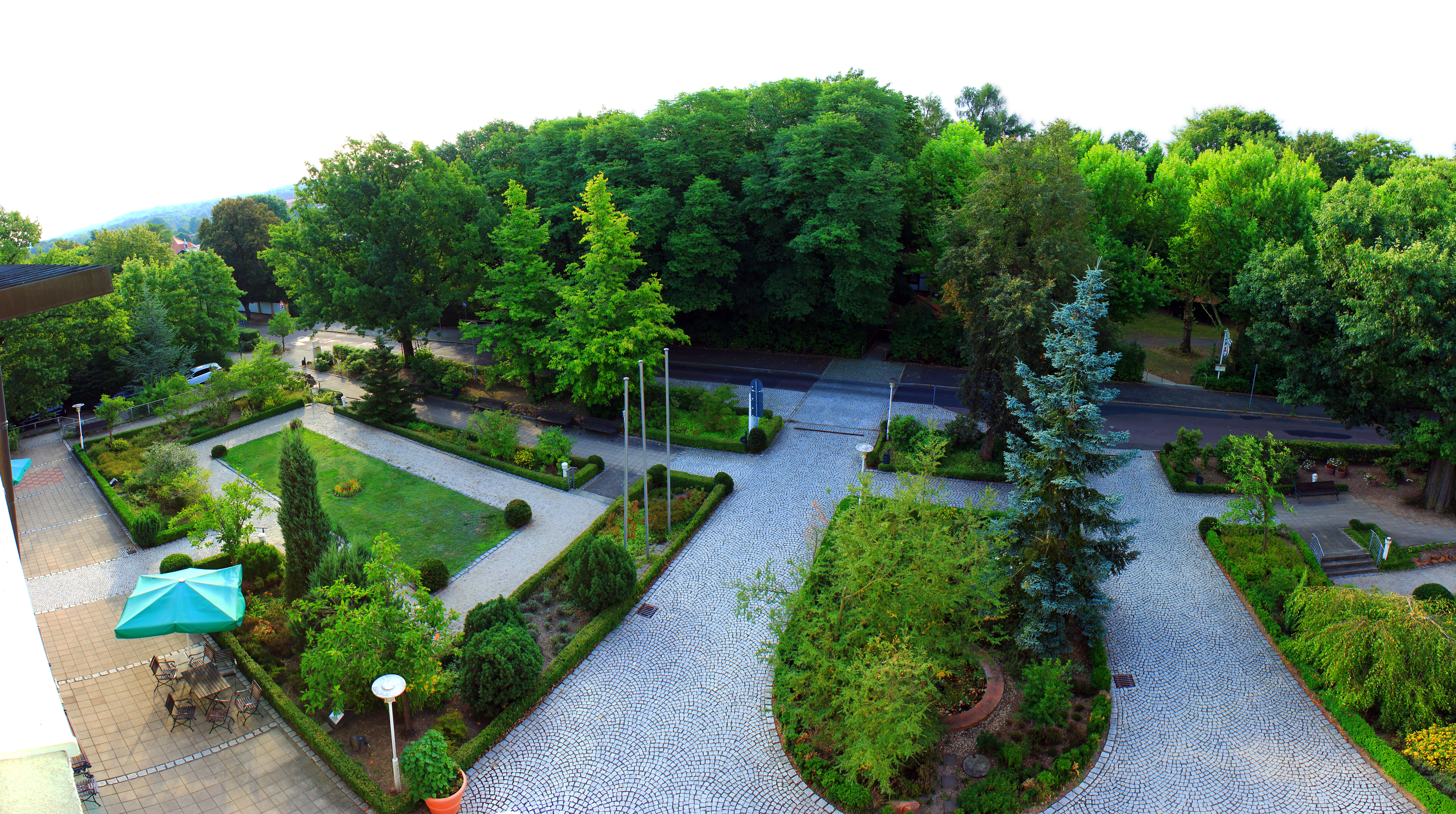
Spa park

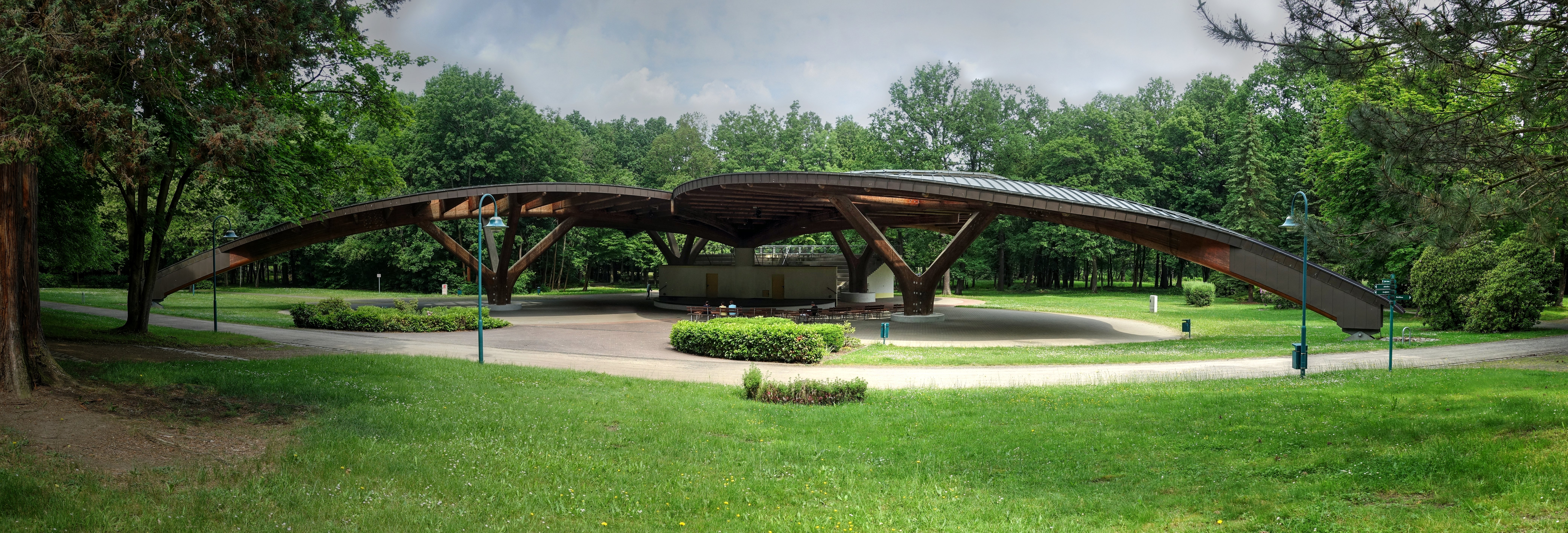
open air stage "Schmetterling" (en: butterfly)

== Sons and daughters of the town ==
- Franz von Fleischer (1801–1878), botanist
- Friedrich Küchenmeister (1821–1890), physician and freemason
- Walther von Witzleben (1865–1949), Saxon major general
- Herbert Albert (1903–1973), pianist and orchestra conductor
