= Falkenhain =

- Ortsteil of Lossatal
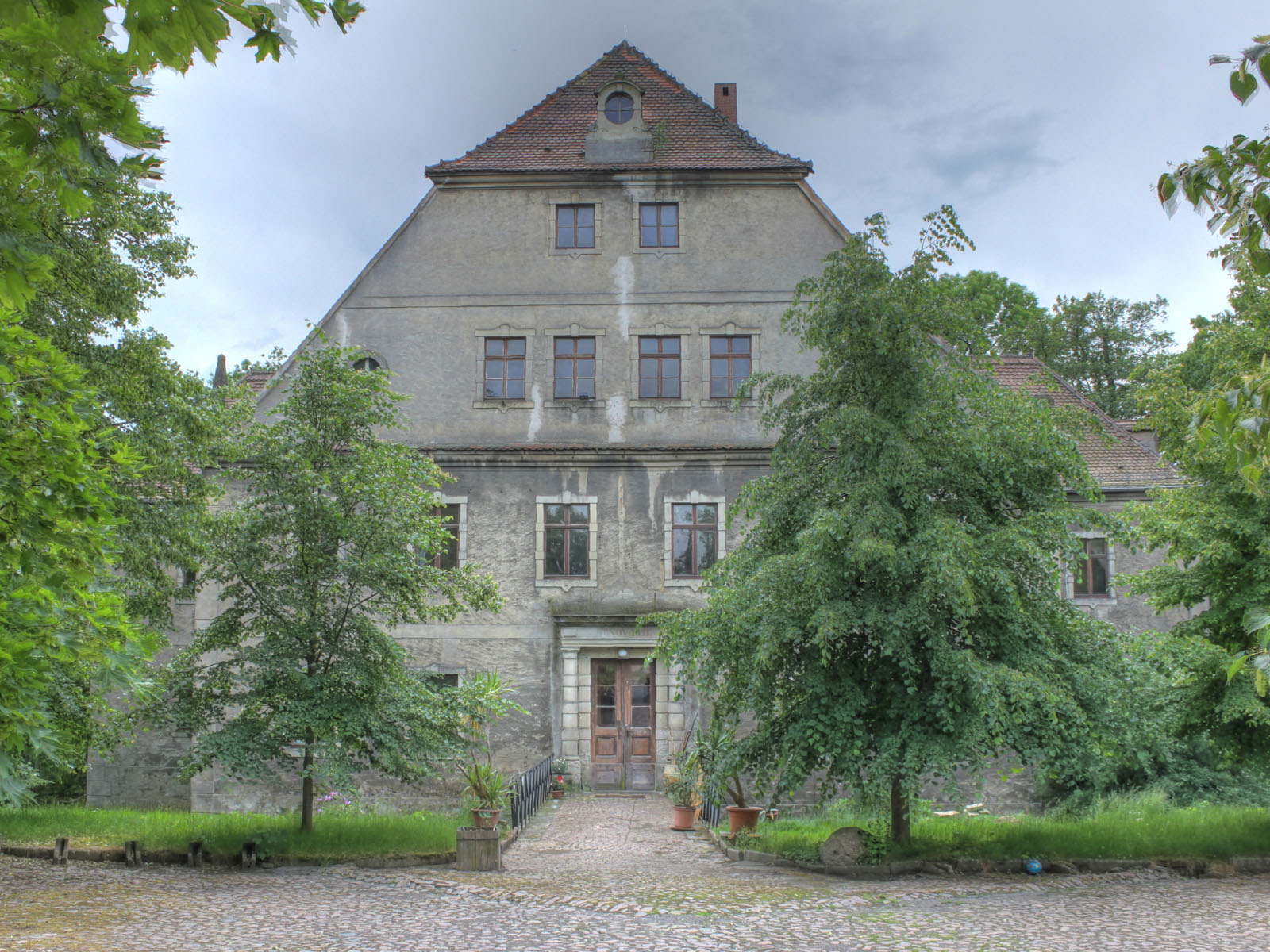
- Falkenhain Manor

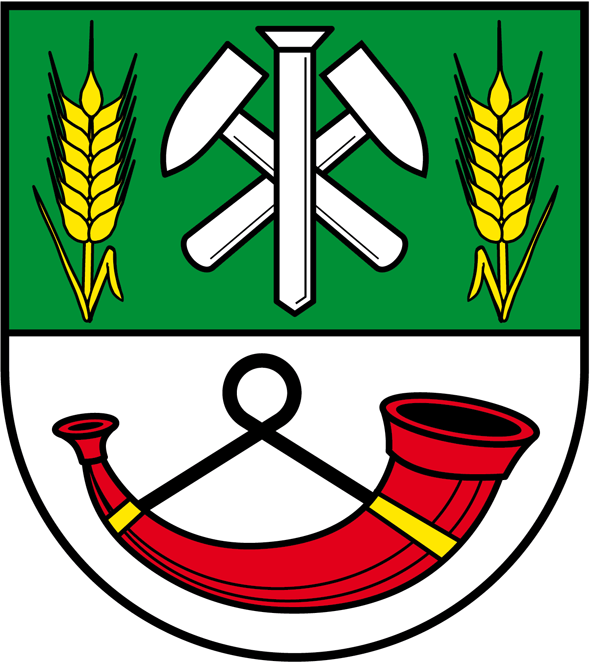
- Coat of arms
- Interactive map of Falkenhain
- Location within Germany Location within Saxony
- Coordinates: 51°23′57″N 12°52′25″E
- Country: Germany
- State: Saxony
- District: Leipzig
- Municipality: Lossatal
- Subdivisions: 10

Area
  - Total: 73.25 km^{2} (28.28 sq mi)
- Elevation: 144 m (472 ft)

Population (2010-12-31)
  - Total: 3,727
  - Density: 50.88/km^{2} (131.8/sq mi)
- Time zone: UTC+01:00 (CET)
  - Summer (DST): UTC+02:00 (CEST)
- Postal codes: 04808
- Dialling codes: 034262
- Vehicle registration: L
- Website: www.gemeinde-falkenhain.de

Falkenhain is a former municipality in the Leipzig district in Saxony, Germany. On 1 January 2012, it merged with Hohburg, forming the new municipality of Lossatal.
