= Unio Itineraria =

German scientific society

Unio Itineraria was a German scientific society which was based at Esslingen am Neckar in Baden-Württemberg, Germany. The organisation paid botanists to travel and collect plants, and sold the collections in large sets which often resemble exsiccatae. The fifteen series with the title Unio itineraria are listed and described with bibliographic data in IndExs – Index of Exsiccatae. Rising costs associated with the Wilhelm Schimper expeditions led to the collapse of Unio Itineraria in 1842. Significant portions of the Unio Itineraria collections were directed to Herbarium Tubingense at the University of Tübingen in Baden-Württemberg.

== History ==
Supported by William I of Württemberg (1781–1864), Unio Itineraria was established ca. 1825 to promote scientific investigation through the collection and distribution of determined (identified) plant specimens. The first collections distributed were those made by Franz von Fleischer in the surroundings of Trieste, Italy (1826). Unio Itineraria was organized by botanist Christian Ferdinand Friedrich Hochstetter (1787–1860) and physician Ernst Gottlieb von Steudel (1783–1856).

The directors of Unio Itineraria raised funds through subscribers to the project to pay for expeditions and sold specimens as a dealership. The organization also sold birds, insects and libraries often as intermediaries and maintained agents. Several collectors are associated with the Unio Itineraria notably the organizers Ernst Gottlieb von Steudel and Christian Ferdinand Friedrich Hochstetter as well as the explorer collectors:

- Franz von Fleischer (1801–1878) Expeditions to Illyria, Istria, Greece, Asia Minor, Syria and Egypt
- Joseph C. Frank (1782-1835) Expedition to Ohio
- Christian Friedrich Ecklon (1795 –1868) Expedition to South Africa
- Friedrich Welwitsch (1806 –1872) Expeditions to Portugal, Madeira, Canary Islands, Angola
- Anton Wiest (1801-1835) Expedition to Egypt
- Theodor Kotschy (1813–1866) Botanical research throughout the Middle East and northern Africa
- Wilhelm Schimper (1804-1878) Expeditions to Algeria, Austria, Ethiopia, Egypt, France, Germany, Greece, Saudi Arabia and Syria

After 1842 Rudolph Friedrich Hohenacker continued in editing and distributing remaining specimens of Unio Itineraria, among others in a series with the title W. Schimper pl. Abyssin. Ed. II Hohenacker. 1852. Further eight series with the title Unio itineraria cryptogamica were published and distributed between 1863 and 1868.
