= Löbenberg =

Mountain in Germany

- Location within Saxony Location within Germany

Highest point
- Elevation: 240 m (790 ft)
- Coordinates: 51°25′18″N 12°47′51″E

Geography
- Location: Saxony, Germany
- Parent range: Hohburg Hills

Löbenberg is the highest mountain in the Hohburg area (240 m) in Saxony, southeastern Germany.

== Geology ==
Like the other mountains in the area, the Löbenberg is of volcanic origin. Its age is estimated at around 280 million years, dating to the time of the Lower Permian period. During the ice ages, the hilltop was ground down to its current round shape. It consists mostly of quartz porphyry, which was mined in several quarries from the mid-19th century to the late 1950s for use as paving stones and gravel (Schotter).
