= Parthenstein =

- Municipality
- Coat of arms

- Location of Parthenstein within Leipzig district
- Interactive map of Parthenstein
- Location within Germany Location within Saxony
- Coordinates: 51°15′24″N 12°38′24″E
- Country: Germany
- State: Saxony
- District: Leipzig
- Subdivisions: 4

Government
  - Mayor (2020–27): Jürgen Kretschel

Area
  - Total: 35.05 km^{2} (13.53 sq mi)
- Elevation: 120 m (390 ft)

Population (2025-12-31)
  - Total: 3,495
  - Density: 99.71/km^{2} (258.3/sq mi)
- Time zone: UTC+01:00 (CET)
  - Summer (DST): UTC+02:00 (CEST)
- Postal codes: 04668
- Dialling codes: 034293
- Vehicle registration: L, BNA, GHA, GRM, MTL, WUR
- Website: www.parthenstein.de

Parthenstein (German pronunciation: [ˈpaʁtn̩ʃtaɪn]) is a municipality in the Leipzig district in Saxony, Germany. It was created in 1994 by the merger of the former municipalities Grethen, Großsteinberg, Klinga and Pomßen.
