= Friedbert Streller =

German musicologist and composer

Friedbert Streller (21 December 1931 – 24 December 2017) was a German musicologist and composer.

== Life ==
Born in Hohburg (Note: Most sources name Hohburg near Wurzen as the place of birth, the German National Library gives Hohnstein.) near Wurzen, Streller studied music education, musicology and composition with Fred Lohse at the University of Leipzig from 1950 to 1956. He then taught himself as a lecturer in Magdeburg, Halle and from 1963 to 1993 at the Hochschule für Musik Carl Maria von Weber Dresden. He published biographical studies on Aram Khachaturian, Paul Hindemith, Sergei Prokofieff and Dmitri Shostakovich in addition to his work as a music critic. From 1959, he also worked as a composer, writing symphonies, the first of which is dedicated to Shostakovich, string quartets, concertos, suites and motets. Streller was a formative member in the German Shostakovich Society.

Streller died in Dresden at the age of 86.

Streller's estate is preserved in the Saxon State and University Library Dresden.

== Work ==
=== Publications ===
- Sergej Prokofjew. VEB Breitkopf & Härtel, Leipzig 1960.
- Aram Chatschaturjan. Deutscher Verlag für Musik, Leipzig 1968.
- Dmitri Schostakowitsch. Für Sie porträtiert. Deutscher Verlag für Musik, Leipzig 1982.
- Revolte und Aufbruch. Musikhistorische Studien zum Expressionismus in Deutschland. Universität Halle, 1988.
- Paul Hindemith. Für Sie porträtiert. Deutscher Verlag für Musik, Leipzig 1985.
- Erwin Schulhoffs Beziehungen zu Berlin. In Traude Ebert-Obermeier: Studien zur Berliner Musikgeschichte. Vom 18. Jahrhundert bis zur Gegenwart. Henschel, Berlin 1989, ISBN 3-362-00328-1.
- Sergej Prokofjew und seine Zeit. Laaber Verlag, 2003, ISBN 9783890075549.
- Schostakowitschs späte Hinwendung zum Lied. In: Schostakowitsch-Aspekte – Analysen und Studien, Verlag Ernst Kuhn, Berlin 2014, ISBN 9783936637298.
- Neoklassizismus oder verordneter Traditionsbezug? Schostakowitschs Adaption Bachscher Themen und Formen. In Schostakowitsch, Prokofjew und andere Komponisten – Studien und Analysen. Schostakowitsch-Studien vol. 11, Verlag Ernst Kuhn, Berlin 2014, PDF, ISBN 9783936637304

=== Compositions ===
- Sonatina for vibraphone and piano (1959)
- Thomas Müntzer Suite for organ (1989)
- Passion according to St. John for speaker, soli, choir and organ (1999)
- 1st Symphony in memoriam D. Shostakovich (2004)
- Web.-Side. Three portraits on themes by Carl Maria von Weber for flute and piano (2006).
- 2nd Symphony Down and High in three movements
- Symphonia da Requiem (3rd Symphony) in two movements (2006)
- 4th Symphony, the jazzy one, in three movements (2008)
- Psalm motet Herr Hilf for mixed choir (2009)
- 5th Symphony Pastorale in three movements (2010)
- Sym-Phonia historique (6th Symphony), play off by Bruckner, Ligeti and Hindemith (2012).
- Moses's Thorn Bush. A Biblical Sonata for Organ (2012)
- Franciscan Ode (7th Symphony) for soli, choir, two flutes, strings and percussion (2014)
