= Friedbert Grams =

German politician (1942–2022)

Member of the Landtag of Mecklenburg-Vorpommern
- In office 1990–2002

Personal details
- Born: 24 March 1942 Kallies, Pomerania, Prussia, Germany (today Kalisz Pomorski, West Pomeranian Voivodeship, Poland)
- Died: 9 February 2022 (aged 79)
- Party: DBD (until 1990); CDU (since 1990)

Friedbert Grams (24 March 1942 – 9 February 2022) was a German politician.

A member of the Christian Democratic Union of Germany, he served in the Landtag of Mecklenburg-Vorpommern from 1990 to 2002. He died on 9 February 2022, at the age of 79.
