= Fred Lohse =

German composer and music educator (1908–1987)

Fred Lohse (9 April 1908 – 19 January 1987) was a German composer and music educator.

== Life ==
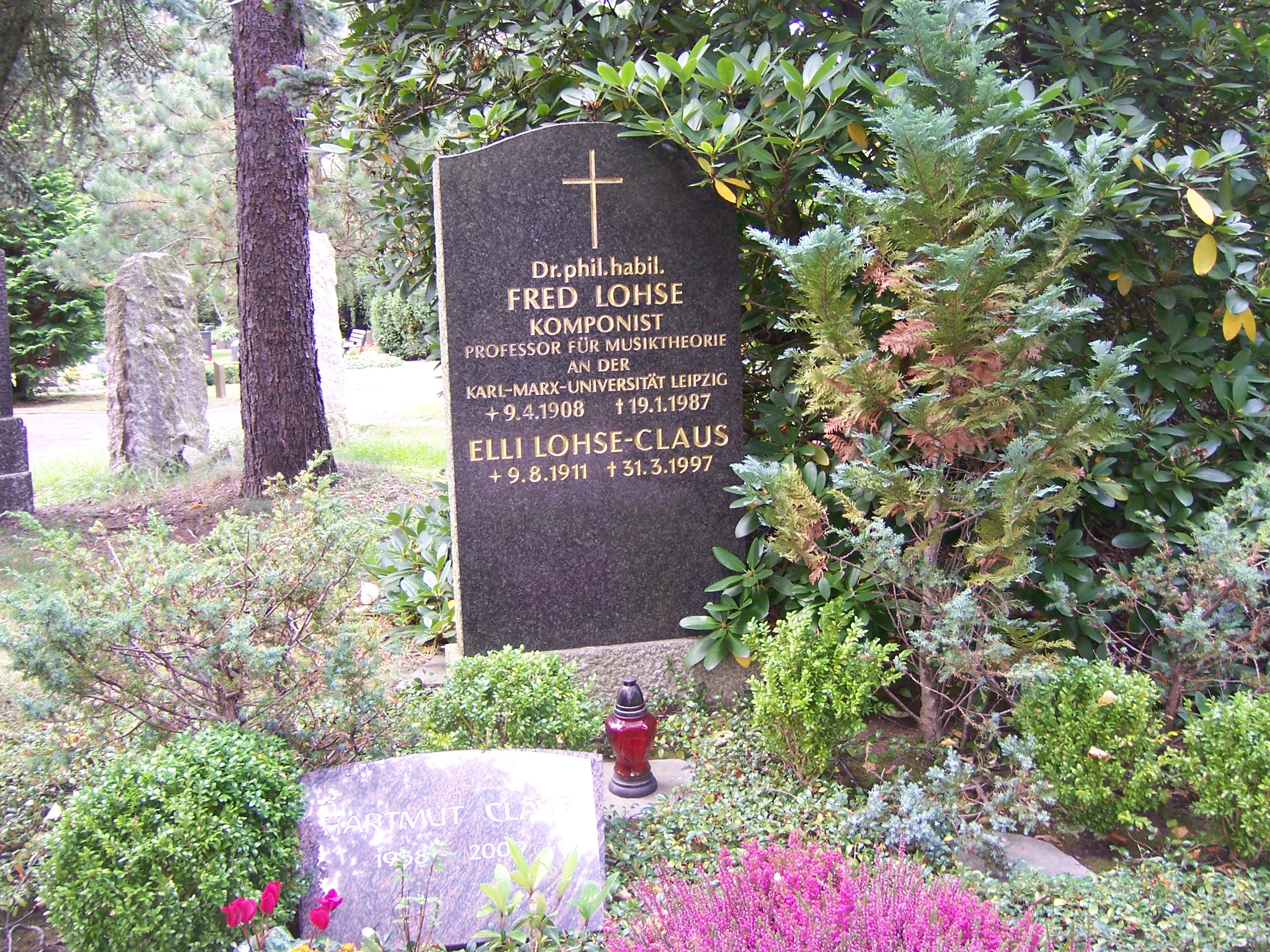
Gravesite of Fred Lohse at the Südfriedhof in Leipzig

Born in Leipzig, Lohse studied from 1928 until 1931 musical composition and counterpoint bei Hermann Grabner in Leipzig. From 1928 to 1952, he worked mainly as a music educator. In 1952 he became a docent and in 1973 a professor for composition and musical theory in musicology at Leipzig University.

Lohse died in Leipzig at the age of 79.

== Awards ==
- 1978 Art Prize of the German Democratic Republic

== Works ==
=== Orchestral music ===
- Deutscher Reigen 6 pieces (1936)
- Symphony No. 1 (1955)
- Divertimento für Streichorchester (1957)
- Symphony No. 2 1962
- Symphony No. 3 (chamber symphony) (1975)
- Konzertmusik für 16 Bläser und Pauken (1976)
- Rondo giocoso (Jugend-Sinfonie) (1979)

=== Chamber music ===
- Variationen über ein Thema von Wolfgang Amadeus Mozart for violin, violoncello and piano (1931)
- Klavierbuch (1937)
- 2 Sonatas for Viola and Piano (1955)
- Sonata for Violin and Piano (1958)
- String Quartet No. 1 (1959)
- Quintet for Winds (1961)
- String Quartet No. 2 (1977)
- String Quartet No. 3 (1978)

=== Vocal music ===
- Deutschland, 4 Lieder with piano (1951)
- Steigendes Jahr, 6 Lieder for soprano and piano (1952)
- Vier Lieder for mixed choir (1953)
- Land meines Lebens, 4 choirs (1959)
- Sinnsprüche (Goethe) for mixed choir (1969)

== Publications ==
- Probleme des zweistimmigen vokalen Satzes (1959)
- Die musikalische Linearität des 20. Jahrhunderts als ordnendes Prinzip einer historisch begründeten und neu entwickelten Systematik des Tonsatzes – Leipzig (1967)
- "Kompositorisches Schaffen für unsere Gesellschaft". Auftrag und Verantwortung des Künstlers in der entwickelten sozialistischen Gesellschaft (Bericht über die Tagung des Präsidiums des Hauptvorstandes der CDU mit Künstlern am 23. 11. 1973 in Burgscheidungen). Berlin: Sekretariat des Hauptvorstandes der Christlich-Demokratischen Union Deutschlands (DDR). 1974. pp. 77–81.
