= Leipzig (district) =

Coordinates: 51°11′N 12°36′E

- District
- Borna, the seat of Leipzig district

- Flag Coat of arms
- Country: Germany
- State: Saxony
- Capital: Borna

Government
  - District admin.: Henry Graichen (CDU)

Area
  - Total: 1,646 km^{2} (636 sq mi)

Population (31 December 2025)
  - Total: 259,516
  - Density: 157.7/km^{2} (408.3/sq mi)
- Time zone: UTC+01:00 (CET)
  - Summer (DST): UTC+02:00 (CEST)
- Vehicle registration: L, BNA, GHA, GRM, MTL, WUR
- Website: www.landkreisleipzig.de

Leipzig (official name: Landkreis Leipzig) is a district (Kreis) in the Free State of Saxony in eastern Germany. It is named after the city of Leipzig, which borders onto the district, but the city is not part of the district. Leipzig district has borders with (from the west and clockwise) the state of Saxony-Anhalt, the urban district of Leipzig, the districts of Nordsachsen and Mittelsachsen, and the state of Thuringia.

== Geography ==
The district is located in the lowlands around Leipzig, the Leipzig Bay, and is rather flat. Individual hills are found in the north (Hohburg Hills) and south of the district. Its main rivers are the Mulde, Pleiße and White Elster. Also worth mentioning are the many lakes of the Leipzig Neuseenland in the west of the county, which were formed by deliberately flooding old brown coal pits.

== History ==
The district was established by merging the former districts Muldentalkreis and Leipziger Land as part of the district reform of August 2008.

== Economy ==
The Leipzig district hosts various solar power plants, including the Witznitz solar park between Neukieritzsch and Rotha, which in 2025 was the largest solar power plant in Europe with 650 MW in capacity.

== Transportation ==
The district is a major hub for rail travel and is served by many major local, regional and long distance rail lines including the Leipzig–Dresden railway and the Mitteldeutschland S-Bahn. Major stations in the district include Wurzen station, Oschatz Station and Leipzig Hauptbahnhof in the city of Leipzig.

The district is served by many major roadways including Bundesautobahn 14 and Bundesautobahn 72 as well as many state and federal roads.

Leipzig/Halle Airport is located just west of the district.

== Towns and municipalities ==
Clickable map of towns and municipalities in the district

Towns
Municipalities
1. Bad Lausick
2. Böhlen
3. Borna
4. Brandis
5. Colditz
6. Frohburg
7. Geithain
8. Grimma
9. Groitzsch
10. Kitzscher
11. Markkleeberg
12. Markranstädt
13. Naunhof
14. Pegau
15. Regis-Breitingen
16. Rötha
17. Trebsen
18. Wurzen
19. Zwenkau
1. Belgershain
2. Bennewitz
3. Borsdorf
4. Elstertrebnitz
5. Großpösna
6. Lossatal
7. Machern
8. Neukieritzsch
9. Otterwisch
10. Parthenstein
11. Thallwitz
