= Otterwisch =

- Municipality
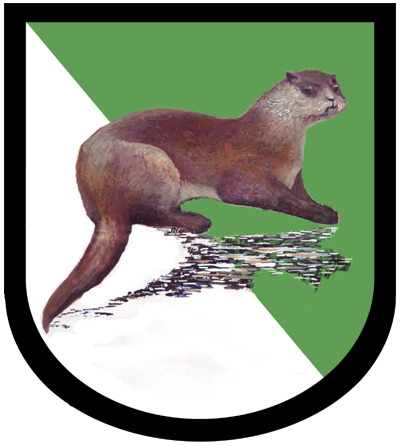
- Coat of arms

- Location of Otterwisch within Leipzig district
- Interactive map of Otterwisch
- Location within Germany Location within Saxony
- Coordinates: 51°12′N 12°37′E
- Country: Germany
- State: Saxony
- District: Leipzig
- Subdivisions: 2

Government
  - Mayor (2022–29): Matthias Kauerauf

Area
  - Total: 22.74 km^{2} (8.78 sq mi)
- Elevation: 159 m (522 ft)

Population (2025-12-31)
  - Total: 1,358
  - Density: 59.72/km^{2} (154.7/sq mi)
- Time zone: UTC+01:00 (CET)
  - Summer (DST): UTC+02:00 (CEST)
- Postal codes: 04668
- Dialling codes: 034345
- Vehicle registration: L, BNA, GHA, GRM, MTL, WUR
- Website: www.gemeinde-otterwisch.de

Otterwisch is a municipality in the Leipzig district in Saxony, Germany.

== Geography and transport ==
The town is situated about 12 km southwest of Grimma and 10 km northeast of Borna. The Leipzig–Geithain railroad passes through the town and the national road B 176 transverses the south of the parish.

== History ==
The first documented mention of Otterwisch was in 1269. The meaning of the place name is not known for certain but may be derived from Otter Wiese (otter meadow). Großbuch is a part of Otterwisch since 1970. Its foundation dates back to the year 1104 and Wiprecht of Groitzsch. Its central point is the church in whose massive tower three valuable bronze bells from pre-Reformation times still function.

Großbuch was the scene of witch trials in the period 1488–1489.

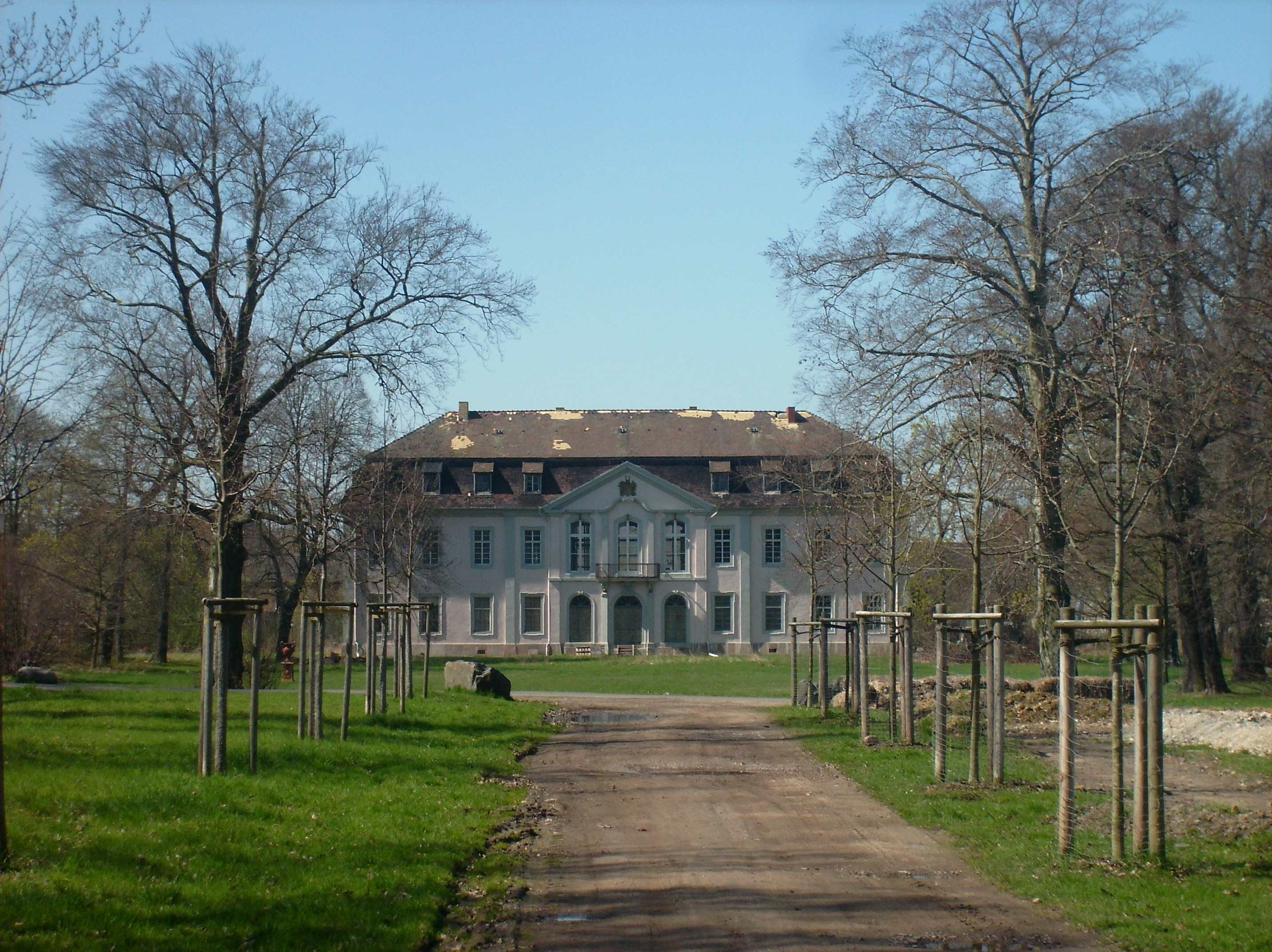
Otterwisch House, from the park side

== Sights of interest ==
Otterwisch House is in private ownership and is being renovated. It was built between 1727 and 1730 by Duchess Rahel Charlotte Vitzthum von Eckstädt in the Baroque style. It belonged to the von Arnim family from 1904 to 1945.
