= Hohburg =

- Ortsteil of Lossatal
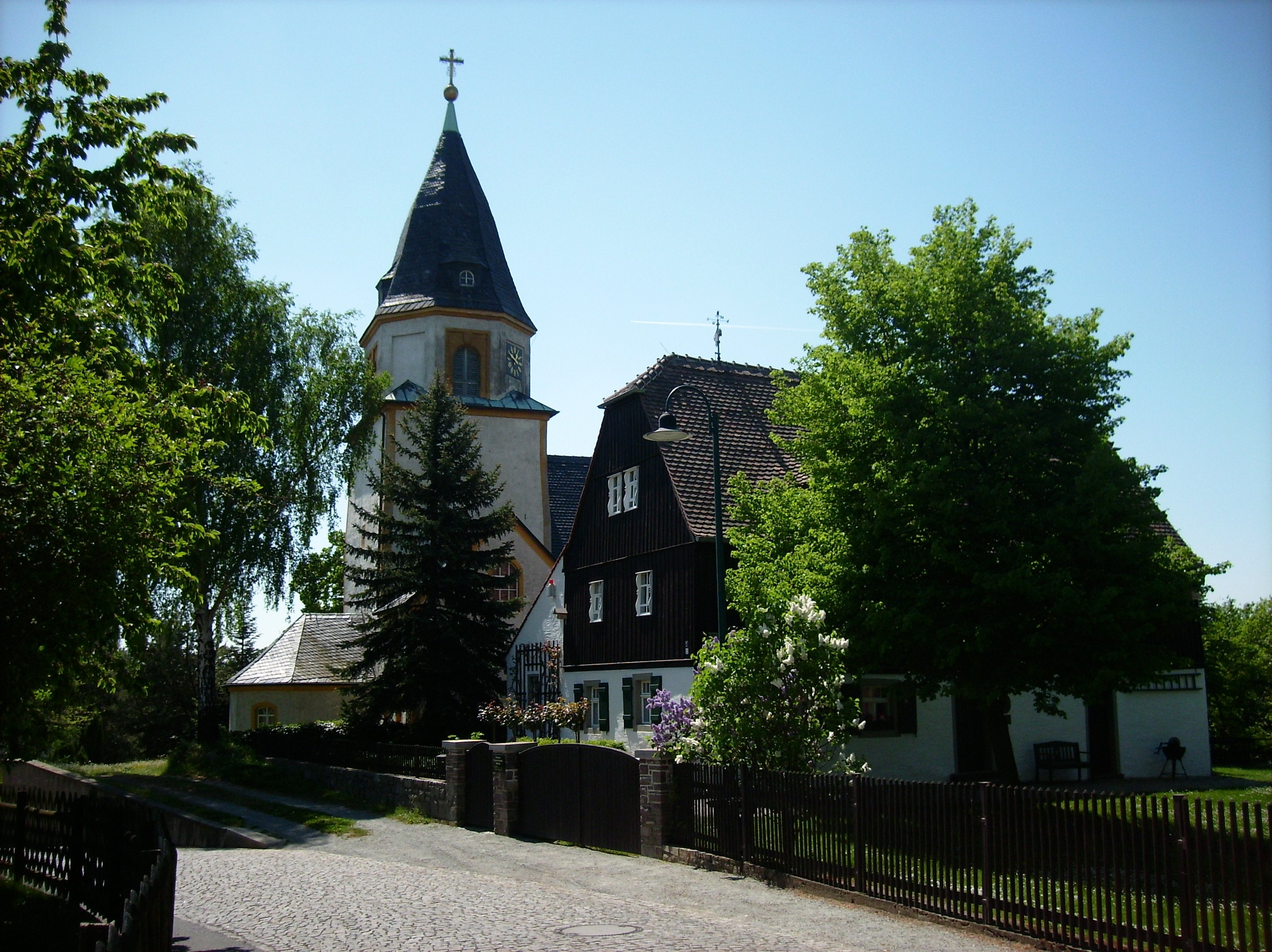
- Church

- Coat of arms
- Interactive map of Hohburg
- Location within Germany Location within Saxony
- Coordinates: 51°25′N 12°48′E
- Country: Germany
- State: Saxony
- District: Leipzig
- Municipality: Lossatal
- Subdivisions: 7

Area
  - Total: 37.56 km^{2} (14.50 sq mi)
- Elevation: 120 m (390 ft)

Population (2010-12-31)
  - Total: 2,810
  - Density: 74.8/km^{2} (194/sq mi)
- Time zone: UTC+01:00 (CET)
  - Summer (DST): UTC+02:00 (CEST)
- Postal codes: 04808
- Dialling codes: 034263
- Vehicle registration: L
- Website: www.hohburg.de

Hohburg is a former municipality in the Leipzig district in Saxony. With effect from 1 January 2012, it has merged with Falkenhain, forming the new municipality of Lossatal.

The composer and musicologist Friedbert Streller was born in the village on 21 December 1931.
