= Lossatal =

- Municipality
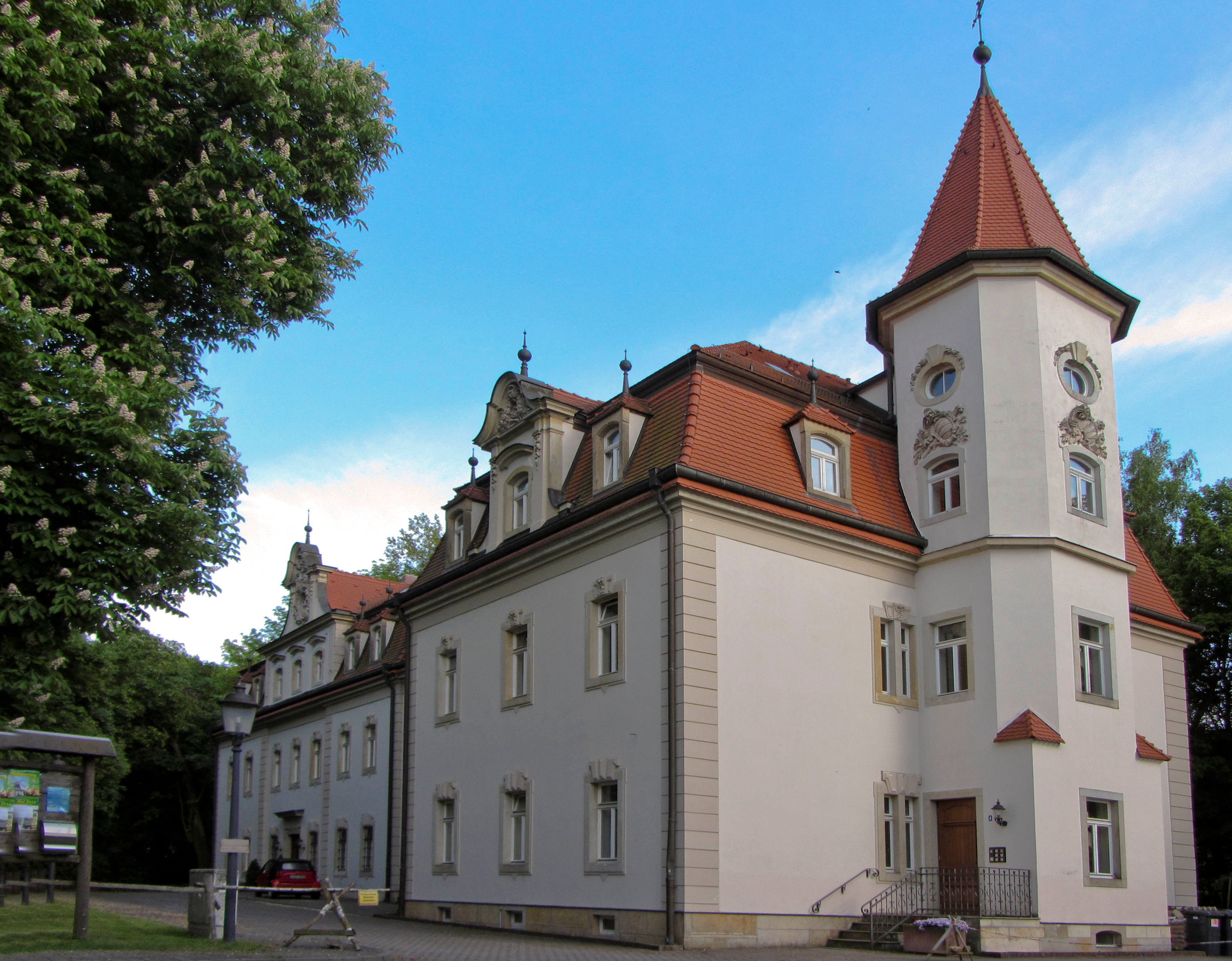
- Dornreichenbach Castle

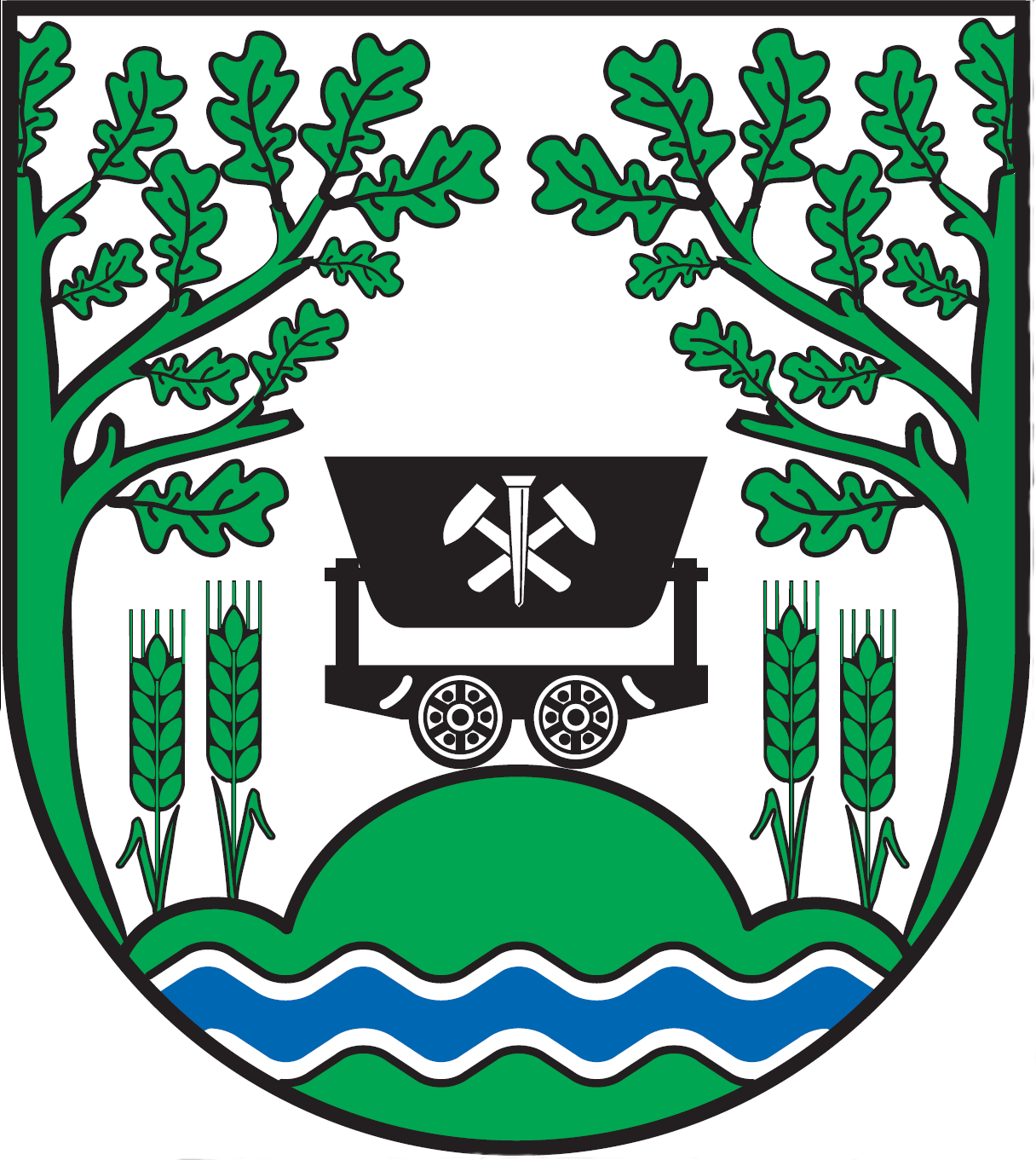
- Coat of arms

- Location of Lossatal within Leipzig district
- Interactive map of Lossatal
- Location within Germany Location within Saxony
- Coordinates: 51°24′N 12°52′E
- Country: Germany
- State: Saxony
- District: Leipzig

Government
  - Mayor (2019–26): Uwe Weigelt

Area
  - Total: 110.81 km^{2} (42.78 sq mi)
- Elevation: 144 m (472 ft)

Population (2025-12-31)
  - Total: 6,013
  - Density: 54.26/km^{2} (140.5/sq mi)
- Time zone: UTC+01:00 (CET)
  - Summer (DST): UTC+02:00 (CEST)
- Postal codes: 04808
- Dialling codes: 034262
- Vehicle registration: L, BNA, GHA, GRM, MTL, WUR
- Website: www.lossatal.eu

Lossatal is a municipality in the Leipzig district in Saxony, Germany, created with effect from 1 January 2012 by the merger of Hohburg and Falkenhain.

== Local council ==
Elections in May 2014:

- CDU: 8 seats
- Bürger Für Lossatal (BFL): 4 seats
- The Left: 3 seats
- Unabhängige Wählervereinigung Falkenhain e. V. (UWV): 1 seat
- SPD: 1 seat
- Freie Wählervereinigung Hohburg e. V. (FWVH): 1 seat

== Mayor ==
Uwe Weigelt was elected mayor in March 2012 with 71% of the votes.
