= Thallwitz =

- Municipality
- Coat of arms

- Location of Thallwitz within Leipzig district
- Interactive map of Thallwitz
- Location within Germany Location within Saxony
- Coordinates: 51°25′N 12°41′E
- Country: Germany
- State: Saxony
- District: Leipzig
- Subdivisions: 9

Government
  - Mayor (2020–27): Thomas Pöge

Area
  - Total: 53.00 km^{2} (20.46 sq mi)
- Elevation: 110 m (360 ft)

Population (2025-12-31)
  - Total: 3,512
  - Density: 66.26/km^{2} (171.6/sq mi)
- Time zone: UTC+01:00 (CET)
  - Summer (DST): UTC+02:00 (CEST)
- Postal codes: 04808
- Dialling codes: 0 34 25
- Vehicle registration: L, BNA, GHA, GRM, MTL, WUR
- Website: www.gemeinde-thallwitz.de

Thallwitz is a municipality in the Leipzig district in Saxony, Germany.

== History ==
The castle was built around 1580 by the Lords of Canitz in place of the medieval ancestral seat of those of Dallwitz. At the end of the 17th century, the manor came to the chamberlain and chief equerry Christoph Siegmund von Holtzendorff, who had the Baroque garden laid out from 1699. The manor then came to the Counts of Hoym and in 1783 it was inherited by the counts and later princes of Reuss-Ebersdorf, who used it as a hunting lodge. In 1848 Reuss-Ebersdorf became part of the Principality of Reuss younger line. In 1882, the architect Arwed Roßbach added a Neo-Renaissance wing with a tower to the palace on behalf of Prince Heinrich XIV. His grandson Heinrich XLV. rented the castle to a plastic surgery clinic in 1942. In 1945 the castle was expropriated; In 1992 the Free State of Saxony became the owner of Schloss Thallwitz. In 1994, the clinic was closed for cost reasons and the building was renovated. However, it then stood empty for decades. In 2008, the castle and park were returned to the heiress of the Reuss family, Princess Woizlawa-Feodora Reuss, as part of a settlement (mainly with regard to movables and museum property of the Reuss younger line). The property is now in a neglected condition.

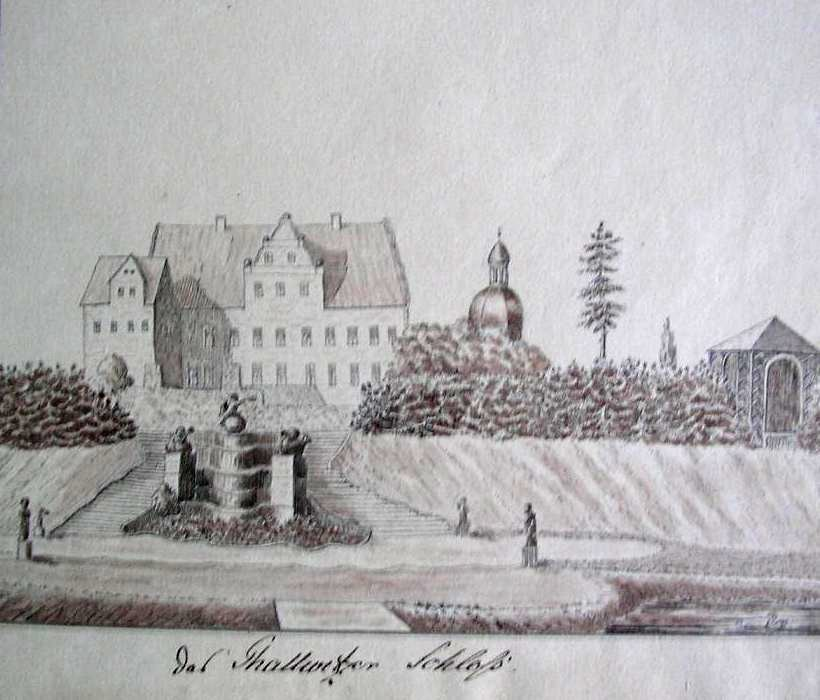
Thallwitz Castle, 19th century

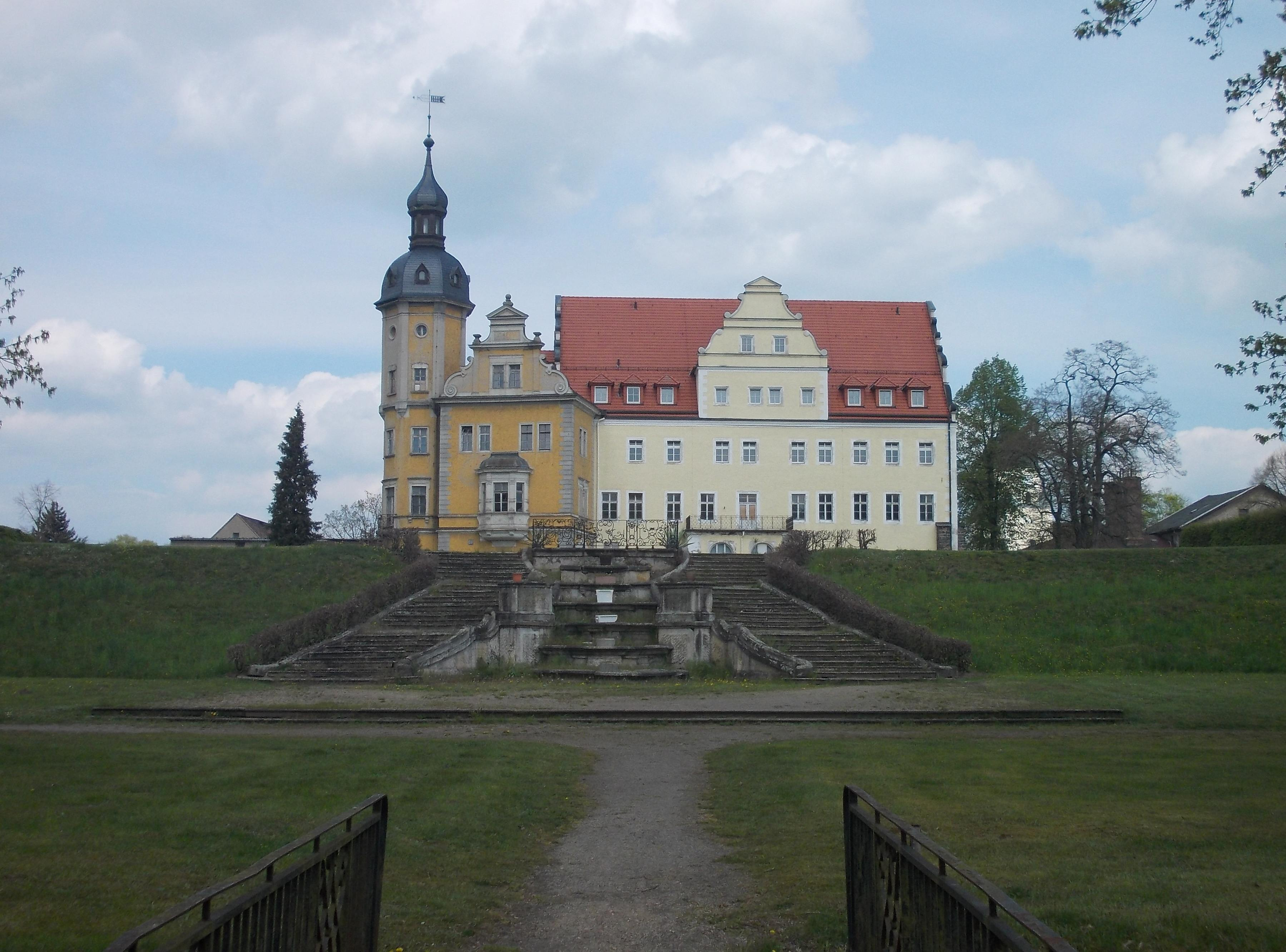
Thallwitz Castle
