= Mulde =

River in Germany

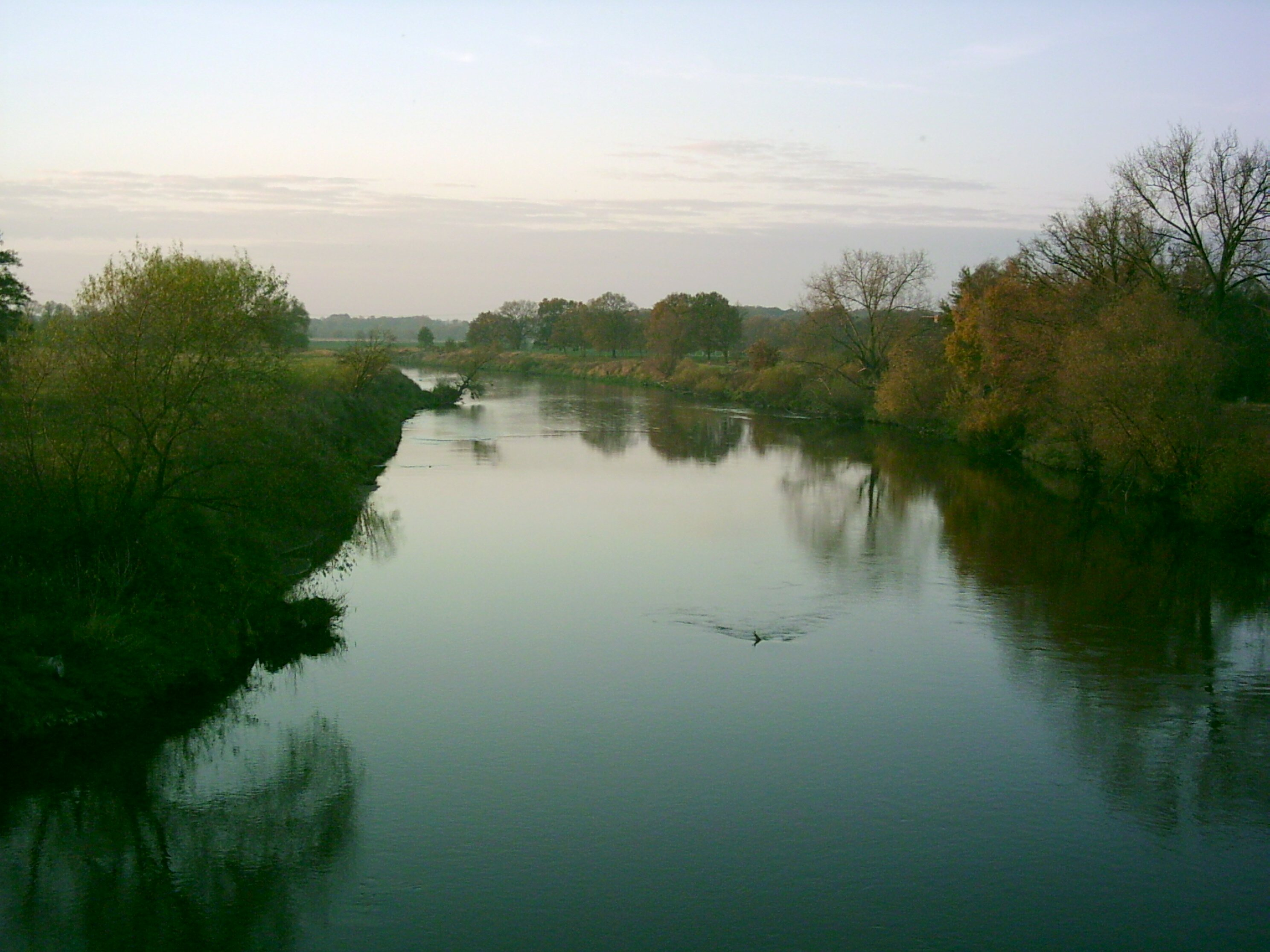
- The Mulde near Bad Düben

Location
- Country: Germany

Physical characteristics
- Source
  - location: Zwickauer Mulde and Freiberger Mulde
  - elevation: 63 m (207 ft)
- Mouth
  - location: Elbe
  - coordinates: 51°52′08″N 12°13′52″E
- Length: 124 km (77 mi)or 290 km (180 mi) including Zwickauer Mulde

Basin features
- Progression: Elbe→ North Sea

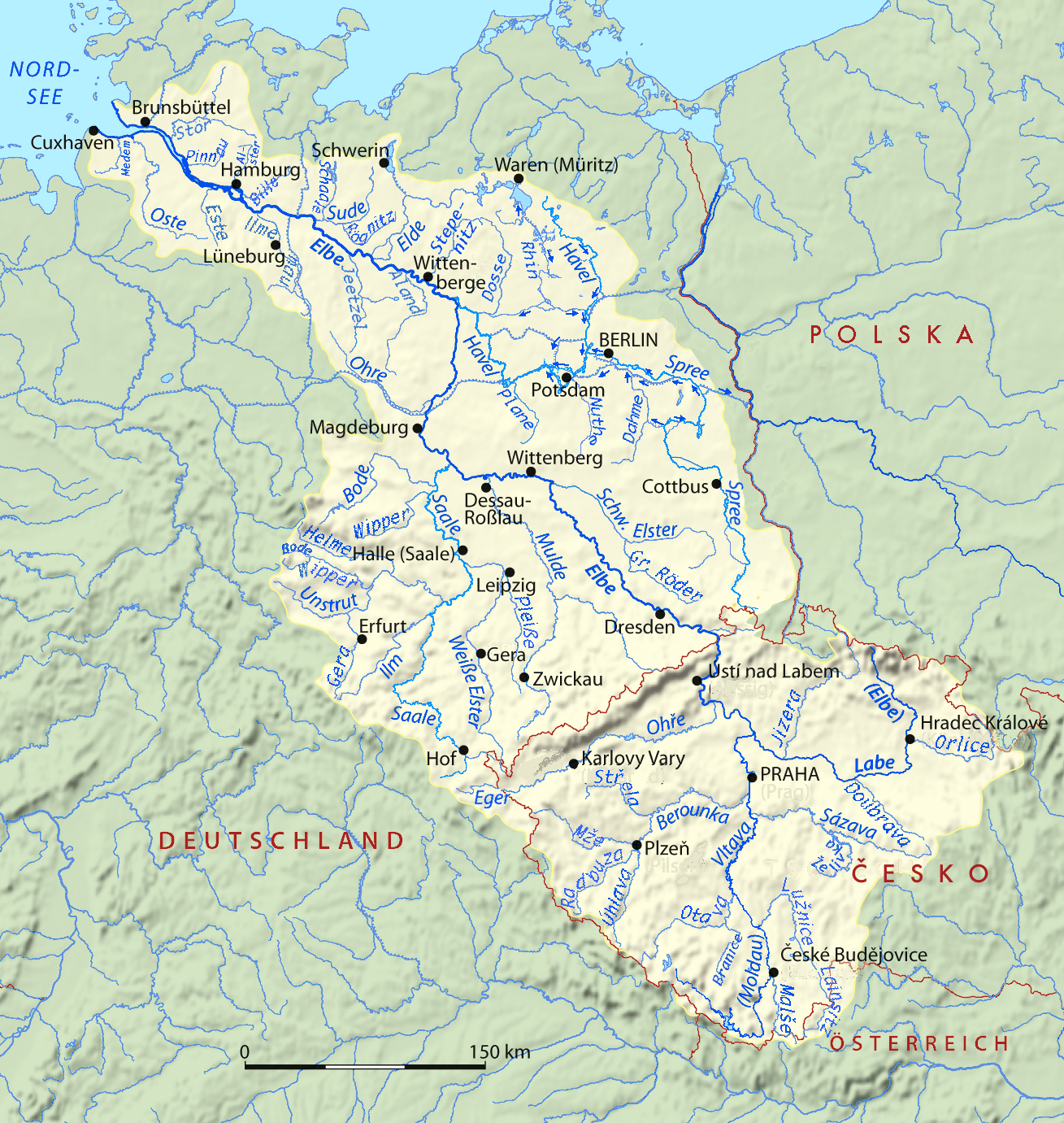
Location

The Mulde (German pronunciation: [ˈmʊldə]) is a river in Saxony and Saxony-Anhalt, Germany. It is a left tributary of the Elbe and is 124 kilometres (77 mi) long.

The river is formed by the confluence, near Colditz, of the Zwickauer Mulde (running through Zwickau) and the Freiberger Mulde (with Freiberg on its banks), both rising from the Ore Mountains. From here the river runs northwards through Saxony (Grimma, Wurzen, Eilenburg, Bad Düben) and Saxony-Anhalt (Jeßnitz and Dessau, the old capital of Anhalt). The Mulde flows into the Elbe 3 kilometres (2 mi) north of Dessau.

In August 2002 a flood caused severe damage, that even endangered the UNESCO World Heritage Site "Dessau-Wörlitzer Gartenreich" and the city Dessau. In June 2013, another flood caused significant damage in the region.

== Etymology ==
Its name could be derived from Old German (possibly Gothic) "Mulda" (𐌼ᚢ𐌻ᛞᚨ), meaning "dust" and a cognate of English "mould"). But more possibly it is related to the German "mahlen" which means "to mill". Therefore, Mulde probably means "the milling river" and corresponds to the great number of water mills driven by the river in former times.

== See also ==
- List of rivers of Saxony
- List of rivers of Saxony-Anhalt
