= Leipziger Land =

- District
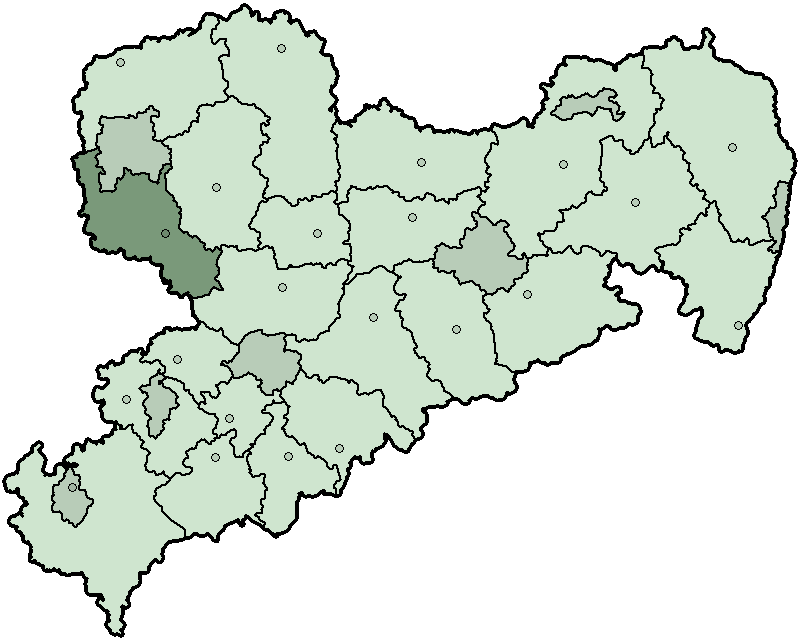
- Country: Germany
- State: Saxony
- Adm. region: Leipzig
- Disbanded: 2008-08-01
- Capital: Borna

Area
  - Total: 752.2 km^{2} (290.4 sq mi)

Population (2007)
  - Total: 145,600
  - Density: 190/km^{2} (500/sq mi)
- Time zone: UTC+01:00 (CET)
  - Summer (DST): UTC+02:00 (CEST)
- Vehicle registration: L
- Website: www.landkreis-leipzigerland.de

Leipziger Land is a former district in Saxony, Germany. It was bounded by (from the north and clockwise) the districts of Delitzsch, the district-free city Leipzig, Muldentalkreis, Mittweida, the district Altenburger Land in Thuringia, and the districts Burgenlandkreis, Saalekreis in Saxony-Anhalt.

== History ==
The history of the region is influenced by the city of Leipzig. See there for more information.

The district was established in 1994 by merging the former districts of Leipzig-Land, Borna and Geithain. In 1999, the towns of Schkeuditz and Taucha were reassigned to the Delitzsch district. In August 2008, it became a part of the new district of Leipzig.

== Geography ==
The main river of the district is the White Elster, which also flows through the city of Leipzig itself. The area south of Leipzig is a big lignite day mining area, which will be recultivated as a lakeland in the near future. The lignite also made the area the main industrial area of East Germany.

== Coat of arms ==
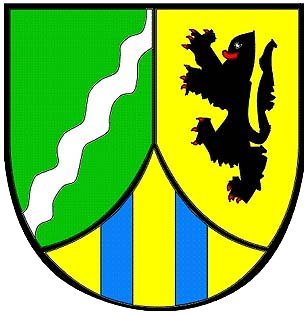
The lion to the right is the symbol of the Counts of Meissen, the vertical blue strips in the bottom is the symbol of the pales of Landsberg. Both symbols are also present in the coat of arms of the city Leipzig. In the left a wavy line on green ground symbolizes the White Elster river.

== Towns and municipalities ==
Towns
1. Böhlen
2. Borna
3. Frohburg
4. Geithain
5. Groitzsch
6. Kitzscher
7. Kohren-Sahlis
8. Markkleeberg
9. Markranstädt
10. Pegau
11. Regis-Breitingen
12. Rötha
13. Zwenkau
Municipalities
1. Deutzen
2. Elstertrebnitz
3. Espenhain
4. Eulatal
5. Großpösna
6. Kitzen
7. Lobstädt
8. Narsdorf
9. Neukieritzsch
