= Leipzig Land 1 =

State electoral district of Germany

21: Leipzig Land 1
- Electoral district for the Landtag of Saxony
- Leipzig Land 1 in 2024
- District: Leipzig (district)
- Electorate: 49,209 (2024)
- Major settlements: Borna, Frohburg, Geithain, Kitzscher, Regis-Breitingen, and Rötha

Current electoral district
- Party: CDU
- Member: Georg-Ludwig von Breitenbuch

Leipzig Land 1 is an electoral constituency (German: Wahlkreis) represented in the Landtag of Saxony. It elects one member via first-past-the-post voting. Under the constituency numbering system, it is designated as constituency 21. It is within the district of Leipzig.

== Geography ==
The constituency comprises the towns of Borna, Frohburg, Geithain, Kitzscher, Regis-Breitingen, and Rötha, and the municipality of Neukieritzsch within the district of Leipzig.

There were 49,209 eligible voters in 2024.

== Members ==
Election	Member	Party	%
2014	Georg-Lugwig von Breitenbuch	CDU	41.7
2019	Georg-Lugwig von Breitenbuch	CDU	34.9
2024	Georg-Lugwig von Breitenbuch	CDU	38.4

== Election results ==
=== 2024 election ===
State election (2024): Leipzig Land 1
Notes:	Blue background denotes the winner of the electorate vote. Pink background denotes a candidate elected from their party list. Yellow background denotes an electorate win by a list member, or other incumbent. A ✓ or ✗ denotes status of any incumbent, win or lose respectively.						
Party	Candidate	Votes	%	±%	Party votes	%	±%
CDU	✓ Georg-Lugwig von Breitenbuch	13,227	38.4	▲3.6	11,372	32.8	▼2.4
AfD	Edgar Naujok	12,950	37.6	▲8.0	11,695	33.8	▲4.8
BSW					3,953	11.4	
FW	Jörg Zetzsche	2,906	8.4	▲2.6	1,449	4.2	▲0.6
SPD	Susan Göbel	2,223	6.5	▼3.9	2,685	7.8	▼2.0
Left	Michael Neuhaus	1,631	4.7	▼6.7	974	2.8	▼7.2
Greens	Christian Müller	538	1.6	▼2.8	649	1.9	▼2.1
FDP	Jonas Siegert	371	1.1	▼2.4	193	0.6	▼2.8
Freie Sachsen	Michael Mende	333	1.0		782	2.3	
APT					335	1.0	
Independent	Dominic Görke	249	0.7				
PARTEI					204	0.6	▼0.3
BD					110	0.3	
Pirates					51	0.1	
Values					43	0.1	
dieBasis					40	0.1	
V-Partei3					38	0.1	
BüSo					28	0.1	
Bündnis C					20	0.1	
ÖDP					18	0.1	
Informal votes		545			334		
Total valid votes		34,428			34,639		
Turnout		34,973	71.1	▲13.9			
CDU hold	Majority	277	0.8				

=== 2019 election ===
State election (2019): Leipzig Land 1
Notes:	Blue background denotes the winner of the electorate vote. Pink background denotes a candidate elected from their party list. Yellow background denotes an electorate win by a list member, or other incumbent. A ✓ or ✗ denotes status of any incumbent, win or lose respectively.						
Party	Candidate	Votes	%	±%	Party votes	%	±%
CDU	✓ Georg-Lugwig von Breitenbuch	10,542	34.9	▼6.8	10,690	35.3	▼7.7
AfD	Frank May	8,971	29.7	▲18.8	8,786	29.0	▲19.1
Left	Enrico Stange	3,445	11.4	▼8.8	3,035	10.0	▼9.3
SPD	Oliver Urban	3,127	10.3	▼5.4	2,948	9.7	▼3.8
FW	Falk Noack	1,777	5.9		1,084	3.6	▲2.8
Greens	Gerd Lippold	1,321	4.4	▲2.1	1,219	4.0	▲1.5
FDP	Stefan Görnitz	1,062	3.5	▲0.6	1,017	3.4	▲0.3
APT					475	1.6	▲0.7
PARTEI					261	0.9	▲0.6
Verjüngungsforschung					215	0.7	
The Blue Party					173	0.6	
NPD					163	0.5	▼5.5
Pirates					66	0.2	▼0.4
ÖDP					45	0.1	
Awakening of German Patriots - Central Germany					42	0.1	
PDV					34	0.1	
Humanists					32	0.1	
DKP					25	0.1	
BüSo					12	0.0	▼0.1
Informal votes		455			378		
Total valid votes		30,245			30,322		
Turnout		30,700	60.9	▲15.5			
CDU hold	Majority	1,571	5.2	▼16.3			

=== 2014 election ===
State election (2014): Leipzig Land 1
Notes:	Blue background denotes the winner of the electorate vote. Pink background denotes a candidate elected from their party list. Yellow background denotes an electorate win by a list member, or other incumbent. A ✓ or ✗ denotes status of any incumbent, win or lose respectively.						
Party	Candidate	Votes	%	±%	Party votes	%	±%
CDU	Georg-Lugwig von Breitenbuch	9,767	41.7		10,100	43.0	
Left		4,738	20.2		4,527	19.3	
SPD		3,691	15.7		3,177	13.5	
AfD		2,529	10.9		2,321	9.9	
NPD		1,304	5.6		1,400	6.0	
FDP		671	2.9		728	3.1	
Greens		548	2.3		578	2.5	
APT					200	0.9	
FW					189	0.8	
Pirates		199	0.8		150	0.6	
PARTEI					73	0.3	
Pro Germany Citizens' Movement					32	0.1	
DSU					25	0.1	
BüSo					15	0.1	
Informal votes		419			351		
Total valid votes		23,447			23,515		
Turnout		23,866	45.4	▼14.1			
CDU win new seat	Majority	5,029	21.5				

== See also ==
- Politics of Saxony
- Landtag of Saxony
