= Eula (river) =

River in Germany

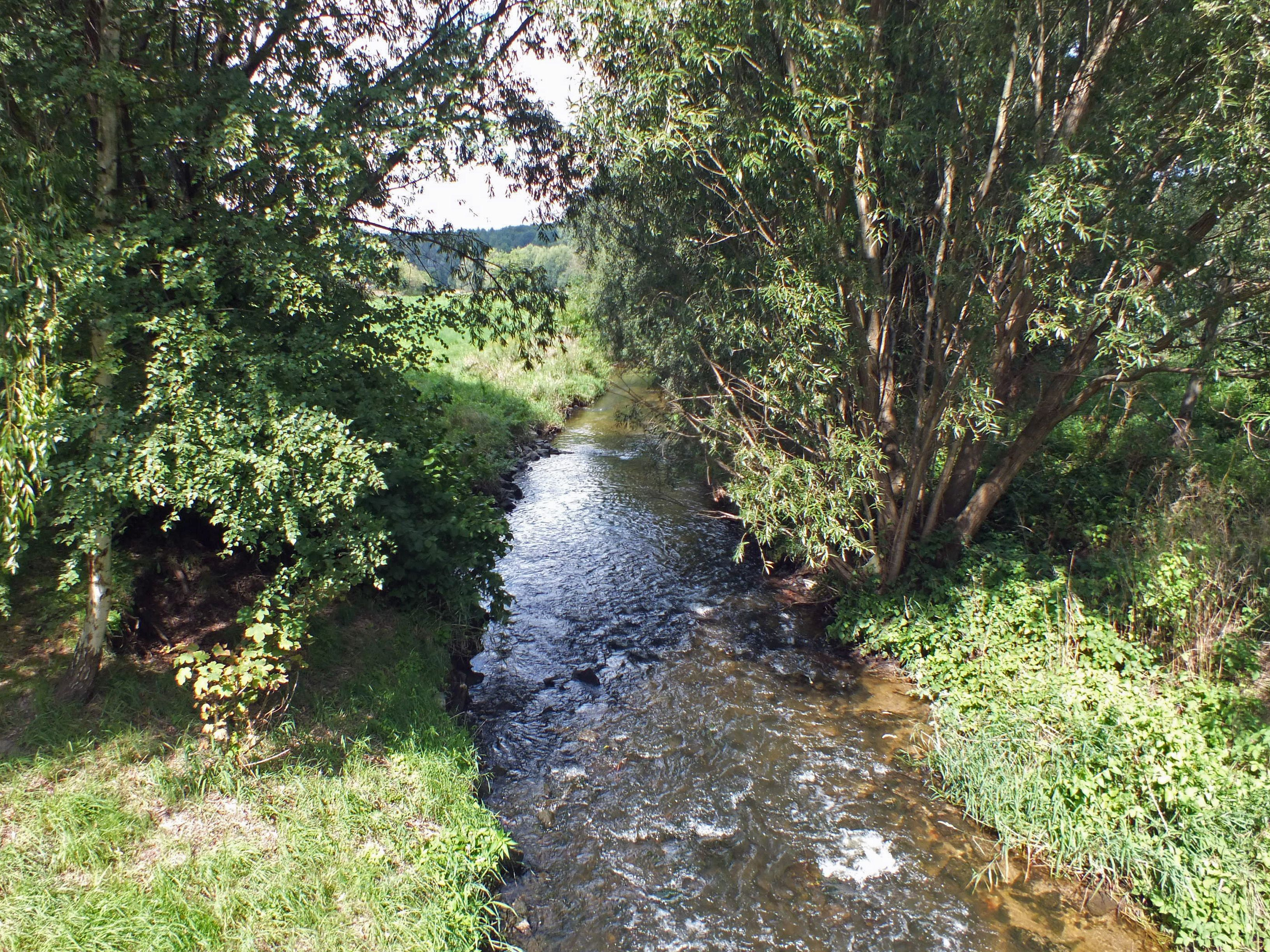
- The Eula near Kitzscher

Location
- Country: Germany
- State: Saxony

Physical characteristics
- Source
  - location: Near Geithain-Wickershain
  - coordinates: 51°01′43″N 12°42′47″E
  - elevation: 255 m
- Mouth
  - location: Into the Wyhra near Großzössen
  - coordinates: 51°09′16″N 12°27′33″E
  - elevation: 132 m
- Length: 31 km (19 mi)
- Basin size: 171 km^{2} (66 sq mi)
- Discharge
  - location: at Kesselshain 1 gauge
  - average: 909 L/s (32.1 cu ft/s)
  - minimum: Record low: 0 L/s (in 11.03.1972); Average low: 141 L/s
  - maximum: Average high: 9.15 m^{3}/s (323 cu ft/s); Record high: 42.8 m^{3}/s (1,510 cu ft/s) (in 28.09.2010)

Basin features
- Progression: Wyhra→ Pleiße→ White Elster→ Saale→ Elbe→ North Sea
- Landmarks: Large towns: Village of Borna; Small towns: Villages of Geithain and Frohburg

The Eula (German pronunciation: [ˈɔʏla]) is a tributary of the River Wyhra in northwestern Saxony in Germany. It has a length of 31 kilometres (19 mi) and a catchment area of about 171 km^{2} (66 sq mi).

== Course ==
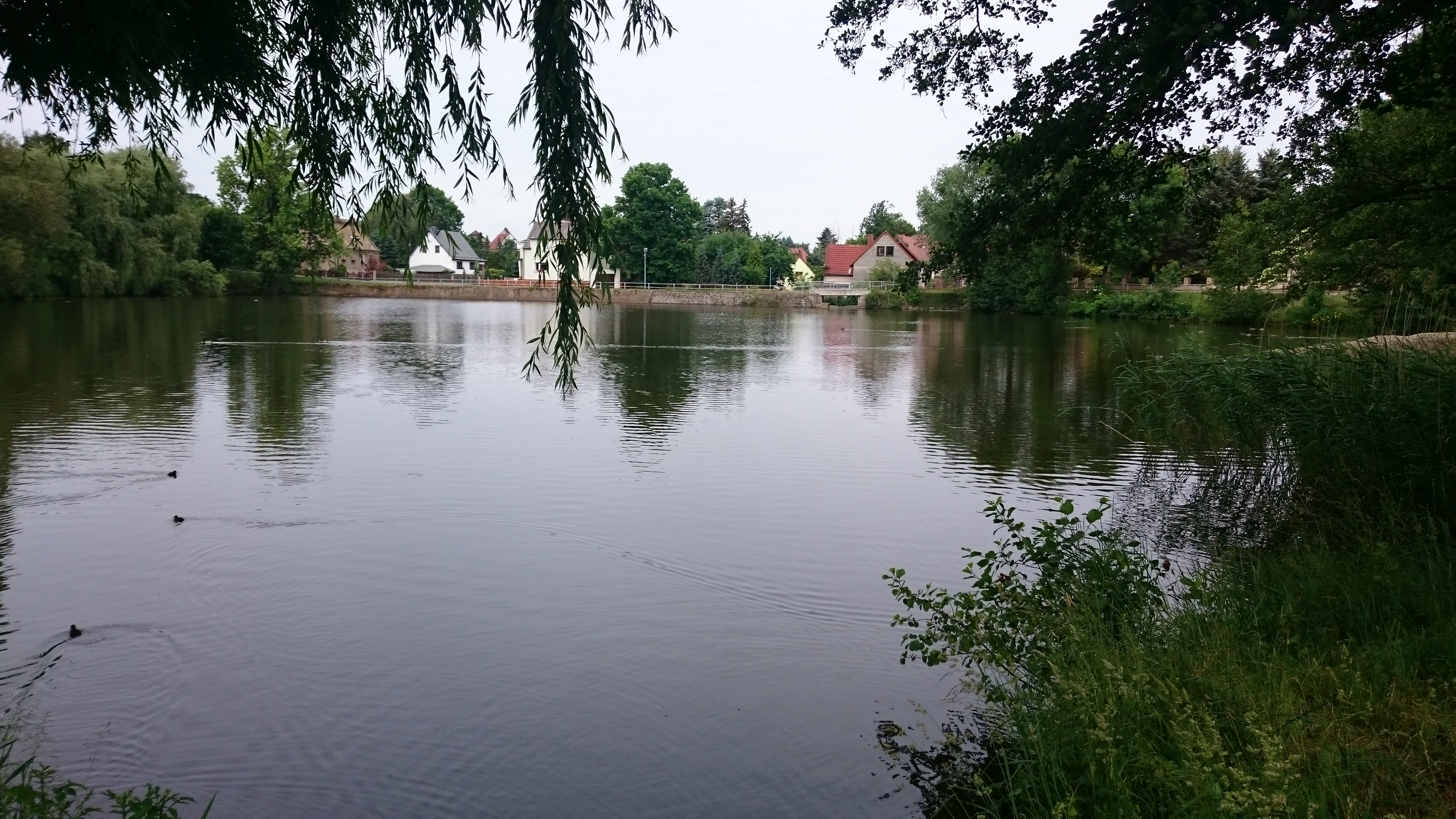
The Oberfürstenteich pond in Geithain, through which the Eula flows

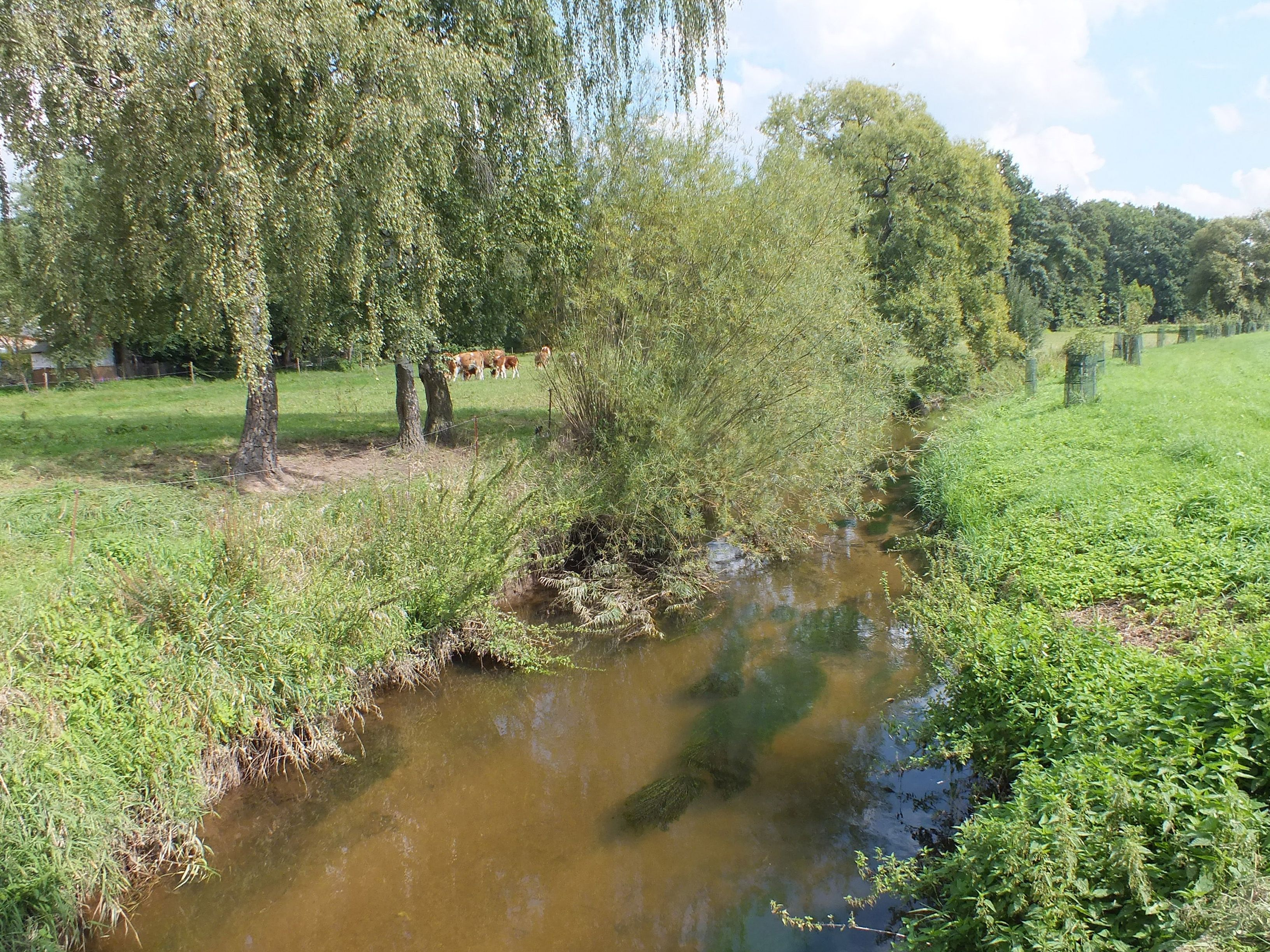
The Eula near Beucha

The Eula rises in the Eulawäldchen ("Little Eula Wood") south of the Geithain parish of Wickershain. It crosses the municipality of Geithain, flowing through the lido of Oberfürstenteich. Beyond Geithain it collects the Salzbach from the left and the Kalkbach from the right. After passing through Niedergräfenhain, Frauendorf and Hermsdorf it reaches Prießnitz. Here it is joined from the right by the Frankenheimer Bach and the Little (Kleine) Eula. Next it flows through Flößberg and Beucha to Kitzscher, collecting the Heinersdorfer Bach and Steingrundbach before reaching Beucha.

Whilst the Eula has been straightened for long stretches, there is a near natural reach between Beucha and Kitzscher with meanders, sand banks and kolks.

After collecting the Jordanbach in Kitzscher it turns from its hitherto predominantly northwesterly course to head in a southwestern to western direction. Flowing past Braußwig (a parish of Kitzscher), Dittmannsdorf (a parish of Kitzscher) and Eula (a parish of Borna), where since 2009 it has once more flowed for half a kilometre on its old, winding river bed, the river passes under the B 95 federal road. It then continues between Haubitz and the Witznitz Storage Basin and after 31 kilometres (19 mi) empties near Großzössen into the Wyhra, which then reaches its confluence with the Pleiße after just two more kilometres.

== Tributaries ==
- Salzbach
- Kalkbach
- Frankenheimer Bach
- Kleine Eula
- Heinersdorfer Bach
- Steingrundbach
- Jordanbach

== Villages on the Eula ==
- Wickershain (Geithain)
- Geithain
- Niedergräfenhain (Geithain)
- Frauendorf (Frohburg)
- Hermsdorf (Frohburg)
- Prießnitz (Frohburg)
- Flößberg (Frohburg)
- Beucha (Bad Lausick)
- Kitzscher
- Braußwig (Kitzscher)
- Dittmannsdorf (Kitzscher)
- Eula (Borna)
- Haubitz (Borna)
- Großzössen (Neukieritzsch)

== See also ==
- List of rivers of Saxony
