= Neukieritzsch station =

Railway station in Neukieritzsch, Germany

Neukieritzsch
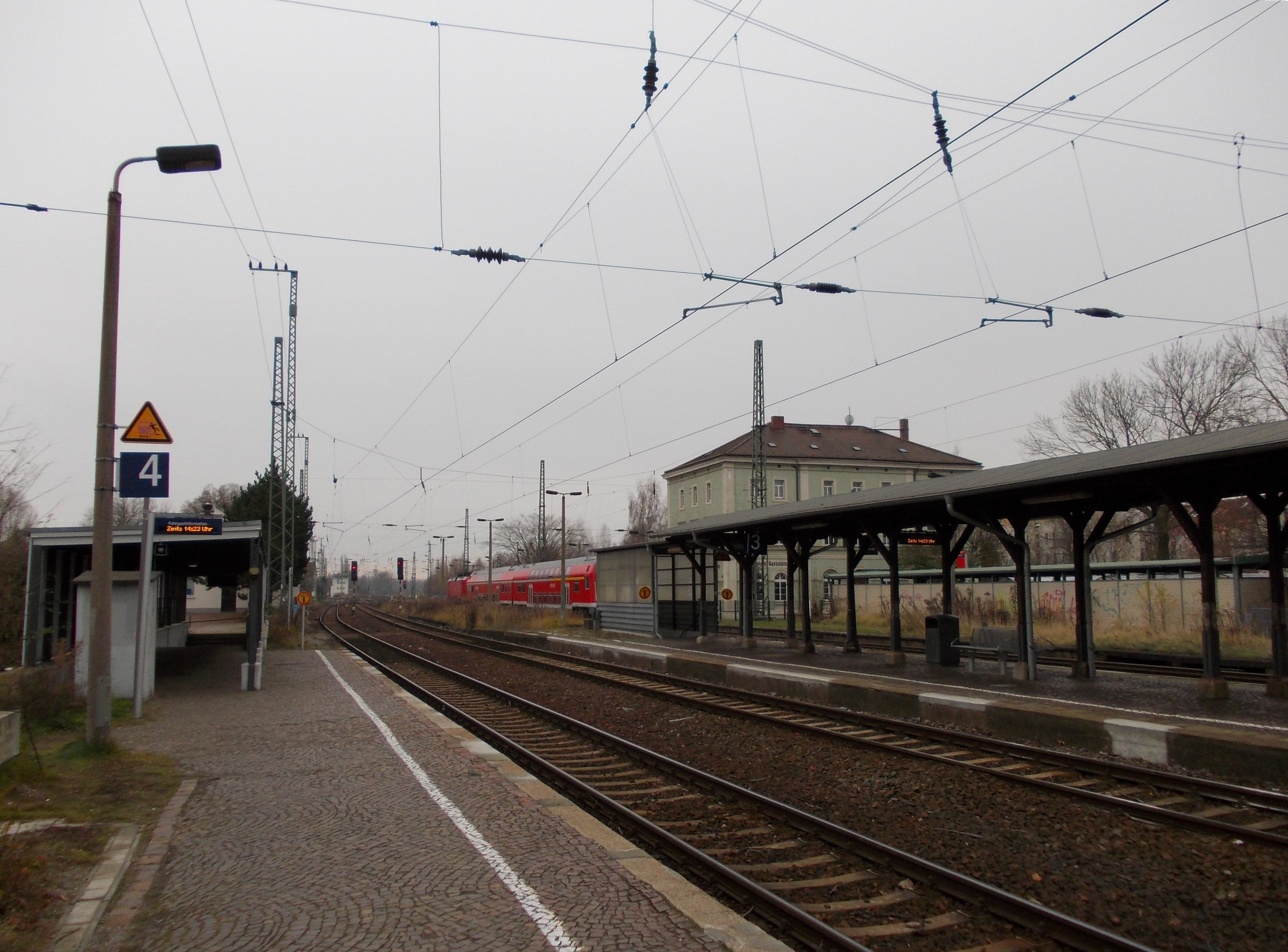
- Platforms (2012)

General information
- Location: Bahnhofstr. 1, Neukieritzsch, Saxony; Germany
- Coordinates: 51°09′01″N 12°24′47″E
- Lines: Leipzig–Hof (km 21.13); Neukieritzsch–Chemnitz (km 0.32); Neukieritzsch–Pegau (km 0.0)
- Platforms: 4

Construction
- Accessible: Yes

Other information
- Station code: 4403
- DS100 code: LNK
- IBNR: 8010243
- Category: 4
- Fare zone: MDV: 152 and 153
- Website: www.bahnhof.de

History
- Opened: 19 September 1842

Services
Preceding station	Mitteldeutschland S-Bahn	Following station
Böhlen Werke towards Halle-Nietleben	S 3	Lobstädt towards Wurzen or Oschatz
Böhlen Werke towards Halle (Saale) Hbf	S 5	Deutzen towards Zwickau Hbf
Location
- Location within Saxony Location within Germany Location within Europe

Neukieritzsch station is a station on the Leipzig–Hof and the Neukieritzsch–Chemnitz railways, which branches here, in Neukieritzsch in the German state of Saxony. The Neukieritzsch–Pegau railway, which has now been dismantled, also branched off here from 1909 until 1999.

== Location ==
The station is located at line-kilometre 21.128 of the Leipzig–Hof railway. It is the starting point of another main line to Chemnitz and the station is located on this line at line-kilometre 0.323. In addition another line branched off in Neukieritzsch to Pegau from 1909 to 1999 and the station was located at line-kilometre 0.0.

It is located about 200 metres east of the centre of Neukieritzsch, bordering federal road 176 (Bornaer Straße) and Bahnhofstraße (station street).

The neighbouring stations on the Leipzig-Hof railway are Böhlen Werke and Deutzen. Both are about four kilometres away. On the Chemnitz line the next stop is Lobstädt, which is three and a half kilometres away. The next stop on the dismantled route to Pegau was the halt of Droßdorf, which was about three and a half kilometres away.

== History ==
Construction of the Leipzig–Hof railway commenced at the beginning of the 1840s. The line between Leipzig and Altenburg was completed in 1842. On 19 September of the same year, a halt (Haltepunkt) was opened in the middle of undeveloped land. This served both passenger and freight transport. The halt was needed to resupply locomotives with water and coal. On the day of its opening, the first train arrived at 9:00 am. This consisted of 25 carriages and carried 500 people. A crowd of people greeted the train at the station, which had been decorated for the occasion. There was no settlement at the station, but a state road passed next to it. It began in Leipzig and ran through Zwenkau and Borna to Altenburg. This road was renovated during the construction of the railway and its route was also changed. Coming from Zwenkau, it crossed the line at a right angle in the area of the station. Thus, it was possible to transfer freight from rail to road.

A settlement developed around the station. First of all, a coal shed, a goods shed, a water loading point and a workshop were built. An inn was built in 1842. A brickyard, construction companies and the first residential buildings were added.

Although located in the vicinity of Pürsten, the station was named after Kieritzsch, which was two kilometres to the northwest. After the formation of the municipality of Neukieritzsch in November 1935, the station was renamed after it on 4 October 1936.

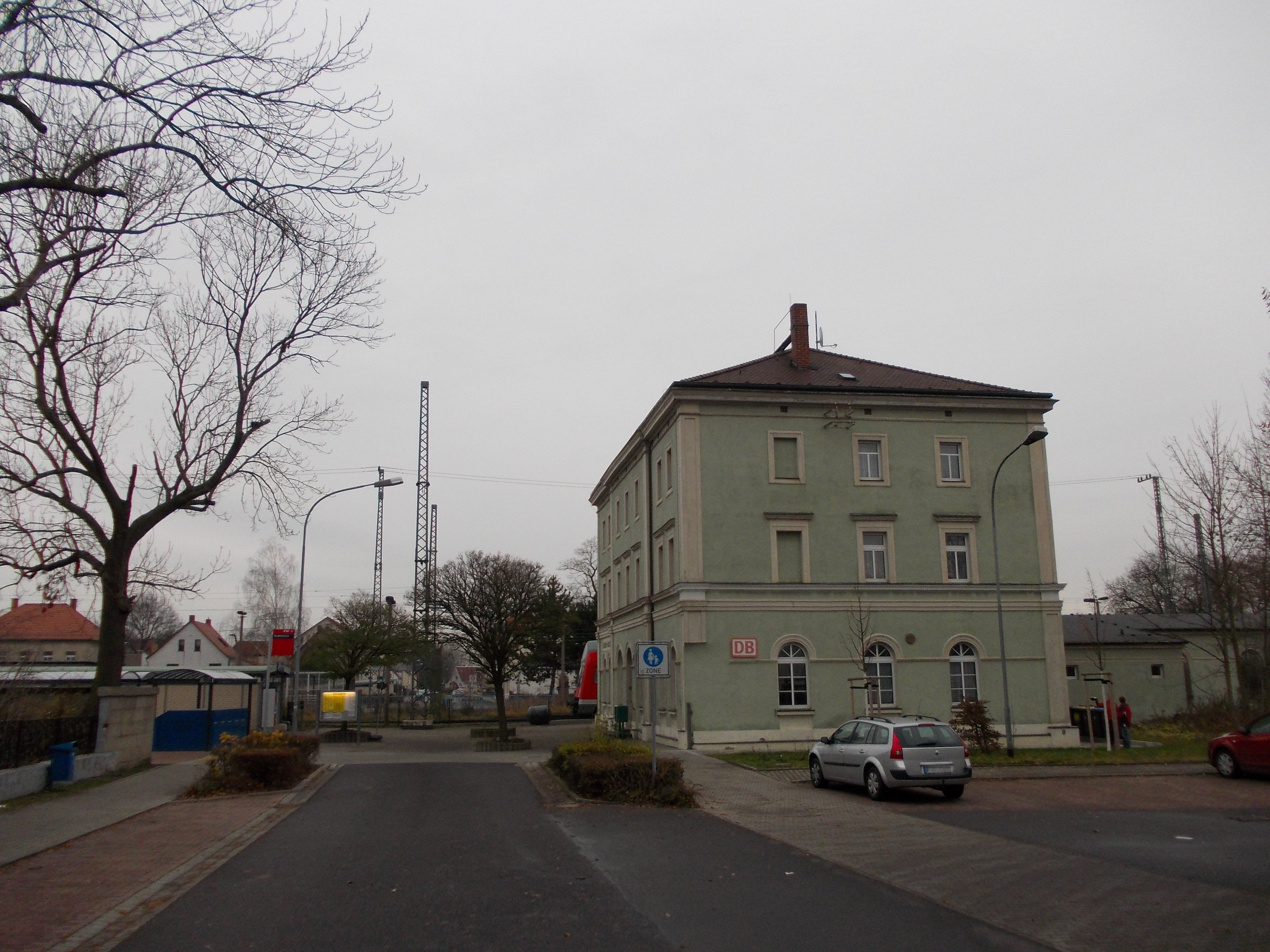
Entrance building (2012)

The line to Borna was opened on 14 January 1867. An entrance building with a station restaurant was built. Different dates have been given for the construction of the building, including 1863 and 1885. According to an article in the Leipziger Volkszeitung, its opening date is unknown. A passenger tunnel and a bridge over the railway were built in 1907 or 1910. The freight yard went into operation in 1907. Another line was added in 1909 with the commissioning of the line to Pegau. Thus Neukieritzsch developed into a railway node. This line was dismantled in 1949, but it was reconstructed in 1957. During the electrification of the Leipzig–Hof line, which took place in 1962, the bridge was replaced by a new structure. Another bridge was built in 1971 because the bridge built in 1962 was closed to allow the construction of a road. The pedestrian tunnel was extended in 1973. The bridge built in 1962 was demolished in 1994. There have been no freight operations at Neukieritz station since 31 December 1994. The line to Pegau was dismantled in 1997.

Since 15 December 2013 Neukieritzsch has been operated as part of the S-Bahn Mitteldeutschland, at first served by lines S4 (Hoyerswerda–Leipzig–Geithain) and S5 (Leipzig/Halle Airport–Leipzig–Zwickau), and since December 2015 by lines S3 (Halle-Trotha–Leipzig–Geithain) and S5 (Halle–Leipzig–Zwickau). Several local bus routes serve the station and link it with the centre of Neukieritzsch as well as with Pegau, Borna and Geithain.

== Facilities ==
=== Platforms and tracks ===
Currently, the station has four platforms. There is one island platform, one "house" platform (next to the entrance building) and an external platform. All platforms have a usable length of 135 metres with a height of 38 cm above the top edge of the rail.

It is planned to renovate the platforms from 2020 to 2023. The construction of three lifts is also planned to make the station barrier-free. Soundproof walls will also be built.

On track plans from about 1960 until 1990 there were always more than 20 tracks and two loading roads.

=== Signal boxes ===
Over time the following signal boxes have been in operation. Pink rows indicate that the signal box is closed.

Designation	Function	Type	Commissioning	Location	Coordinates	Remarks
B2	dispatchers signal box (dsb)	electro-mechanical, Gaselan class	1962	at the fork towards Chemnitz/Altenburg	51°08′45″N 12°24′56″E	
Stw 2	dsb	?	Jan. 1891	south of the entrance building	51°08′58″N 12°08′58″E (?)	shown on track plans (from about 1960 to 1990), B2 entered with a note "new Stw 2 (guard signal box 2), not in operation"
W1	guard signal box (Ww)	electro-mechanical, Pintsch class	1944	north of the platforms	51°09′12″N 12°24′40″E	
W1 [old]	Ww	?	?	north of the platforms	51°09′12″N 12°24′41″E	shown on track plans (from about 1960 to 1990) as "old Stw", then probably out of operation
W3	Ww	electro-mechanical, Siemens&Halske class 1912	?	at Chemnitzer Strecke, district road 7931 intersection	51°08′28″N 12°25′10″E	
W4	Ww	electro-mechanical, Siemens&Halske class 1912	1962	at Altenburger Strecke, Pappelweg intersection	51°08′23″N 12°25′01″E	

Between 2020 and 2023, all four signal boxes are to be taken out of service, demolished and replaced by an electronic interlocking.

=== Sidings ===
The Breunsdorf lignite works received a railway connection in 1905. In 1930, the company ceased operations. Two sidings, Familie Lanzendorf and Baggermontageplatz, can be seen on track plans that were dated between the 1960s and 1980s.

=== Other facilities ===
The following buildings still exist (year of construction in brackets):

- a railway scale (1912)
- a loading ramp (1863)
- a latrine (1864)
- a draisine shed (1909)
- two turntables (1876 and 1896)

There was also a Bahnmeisterei (track maintenance supervisor’s office), which was demolished in 1974.
