= Jännerwein =

Austrian folk band

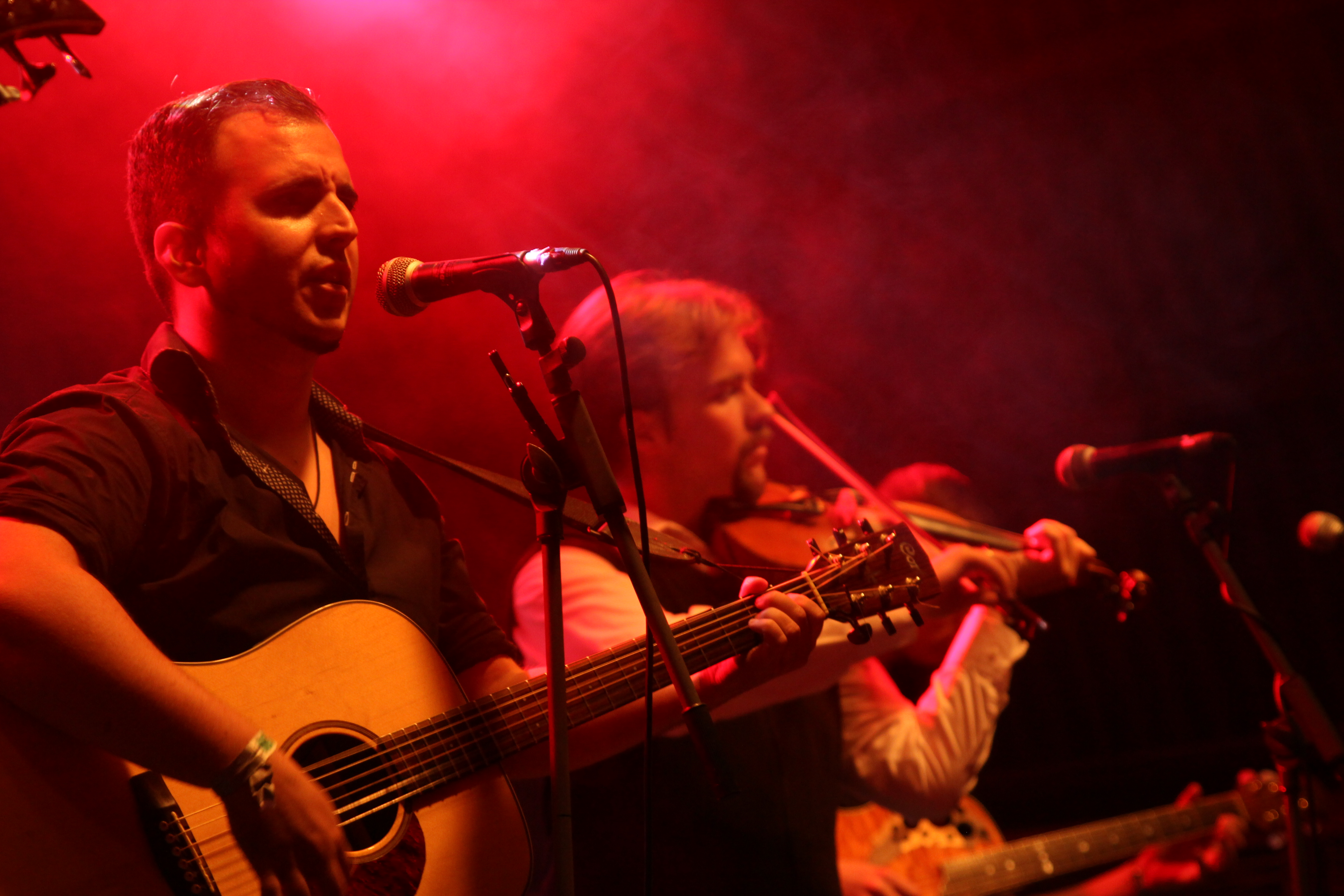
- Jännerwein at the Nocturnal Culture Night 9 2014 in Deutzen

Background information
- Origin: Salzburg, Austria
- Genres: Folk music Neofolk
- Years active: 2007–present
- Labels: Steinklang Records; RainbergVerlag
- Members: Max KTG; Benjamin Sperling; Peter Feldl; Beat Lenk; Vurgart
- Website: http://www.jaennerwein.at/

Jännerwein is an Austrian folk music and neofolk group formed in Salzburg in 2007.

== History ==
The band was founded in Salzburg in 2007. It grew out of Max KTG's solo ambient music project Neuland and its collaboration with the musicians Benjamin Sperling and Peter Feldl. Jännerwein, as a trio, released its debut album Abendläuten a few months later. Its first live performance was at Cave Club in Salzburg on 11 April 2008.

Beat Lenk joined the band on drums after a performance at Wave-Gotik-Treffen in 2009. Two years later Jännerwein released its second album Nach der Sehnsucht, which was followed by live performances around the German-speaking world. In the autumn of 2011 Matthias Krause joined as a permanent fifth member. A third album, Eine Hoffnung, was released in 2015.

In May 2015 the band announced that it would go on a long hiatus after the remaining shows of that year. Max KTG explained for Die Presse that "the thing really had run its course after three albums".

In 2016, the German edition of Rolling Stone tried to tie Jännerwein to right-wing politics. An article titled "Der Sound der neuen Rechten" ("The sound of the new right") characterized the neofolk genre as anti-American, described it as "the uncoolest music on the planet", and wrote that Jännerwein in particular had become the favourite band of "right-wing hipsters". Jännerwein got to publish a response and clarified that they are not a political band and disapprove of ideological interpretations of their lyrics.

== Style ==
Jännerwein sets itself apart within the neofolk scene, which came out of the British post-punk milieu, with its unusually strong influences from folk music and by omitting otherwise genre-typical percussions and audio samples. The instrumentation combines a bass-supported guitar section with instruments such as hurdy-gurdy, violin or bagpipe, in a style that seeks to combine modern singer-songwriter techniques with Alpine traditions. Max KTG explained the style: "The basic mood of our music is borrowed from apocalyptic folk^{α} and industrial, but the instrumentation is from European folklore." The songs are primarily written by Max KTG and Benjamin Sperling, sometimes with lyrics from romantic poetry. Among the writers whose poems have been set to music are Rainer Maria Rilke, Joseph Freiherr von Eichendorff, Friedrich Nietzsche, Gottfried Benn and Chidiock Tichborne.

== Band members ==
- Max KTG – vocals, guitar (2007–present)
- Benjamin Sperling – vocals, bass guitar (2007–present)
- Peter Feldl – vocals, recorder, bouzouki, bagpipe, violin (2007–present)
- Beat Lenk – vocals, drums, accordion (2009–present)
- Matthias "Vurgart" Krause – vocals, guitar (2011–present)

== Discography ==
- 2008: Abendläuten (Steinklang Records)
- 2011: Nach der Sehnsucht – Von der Beständigkeit der Erinnerung (RainbergVerlag)
- 2015: Eine Hoffnung (Steinklang Records & RainbergVerlag)
- 2023: Auf! — Albion's Beautiful Barbarians - New songs for the kindred spirit of Kibbo Kift (Cafe Grössenwahn Grammophon)

== Notes ==
^α An alternative name for neofolk
