= Eulatal =

- Ortschaft of Frohburg
- Coat of arms
- Interactive map of Eulatal
- Location within Germany Location within Saxony
- Coordinates: 51°6′13″N 12°36′38″E
- Country: Germany
- State: Saxony
- District: Leipzig
- Town: Frohburg
- Subdivisions: 9

Area
  - Total: 47.31 km^{2} (18.27 sq mi)
- Elevation: 275 m (902 ft)

Population (2006-12-31)
  - Total: 3,527
  - Density: 74.55/km^{2} (193.1/sq mi)
- Time zone: UTC+01:00 (CET)
  - Summer (DST): UTC+02:00 (CEST)
- Postal codes: 04651, 04643
- Dialling codes: 034345, 034341
- Vehicle registration: L
- Website: www.eulatal.info

Eulatal (German pronunciation: [ˈɔʏlaˌtaːl], lit. 'Eula Valley') is a former municipality in the Leipzig district, in Saxony, Germany. Since 1 January 2009, it is part of the town Frohburg.

== See also ==
- Eula (river)
