= Benjamin Hedericus =

German lexicographer

Benjamin Hedericus (Benjamin Hederich; 12 December 1675 in Geithain, Electorate of Saxony, Holy Roman Empire – 18 July 1748 in Großenhain, Meißen, Holy Roman Empire) was a lexicographer from the Holy Roman Empire. He is most notable as the author of a Greek lexicon that was widely used in the Roman Catholic Church in Europe.

He also authored the following:

- Notitia Auctorum Antiqua et Media
- Progymnasmata Linguae Graecae
- Progymnasmata Linguae Latinae
- Fasti Consulares Romani
- Reales Schul-Lexicon
- Lexicon Manuale Graecum - edited and expanded by Johann August Ernesti in 1767
- Grundliches Mythologisches Lexicon
- Lexicon Manuale Latino-Germanicum

He edited Empedocles' De Sphaera and a Latin edition of Tertullian.

== Disambiguation ==
There was another similarly named individual, Dr Hedericus, who was a Lutheran pastor at Iglau, and an opponent of the Moravian Church in the 16th Century.
