= Kohren Castle =

Hill Castle

- Burg Kohren, Chorun, Sahlis
- Kohren-Sahlis
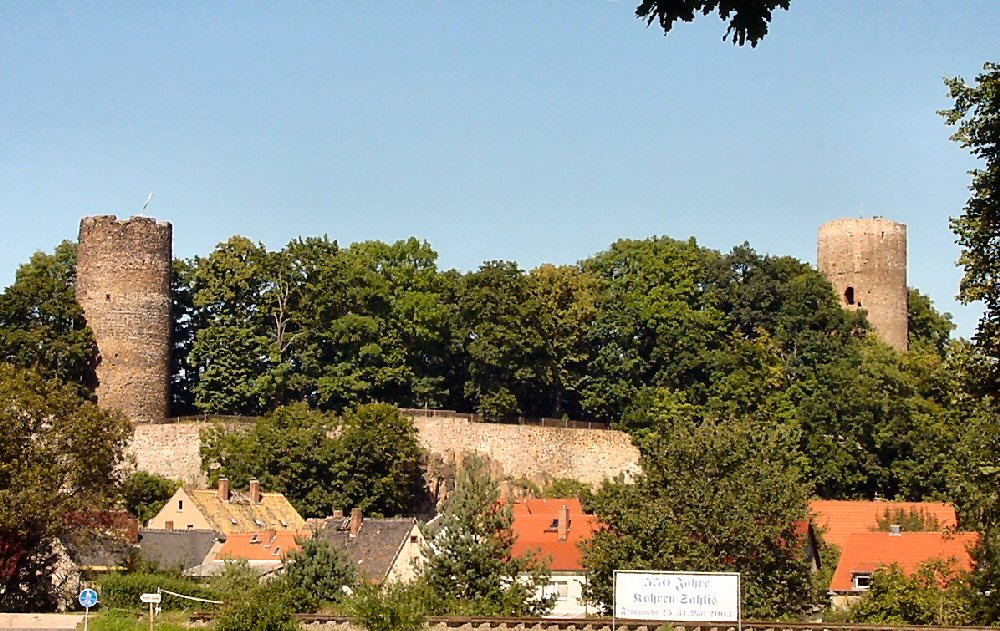

Site information
- Type: Hill Castle
- Code: DE-SN

Location
- Coordinates: 51°1′9.56″N 12°36′1.58″E

Site history
- Built: ca. 1000

Garrison information
- Occupants: Clerical, nobility

Kohren Castle (German:Burg Kohren), also known as Chorun or Sahlis, is the ruin of an imposing hill castle in the town of Kohren-Sahlis in Leipzig county in Saxony.

== History ==
The origin of the town Kohren can be traced back to the time of the Sorbian settlement in the Early Middle Ages. Emperor Otto II gifted the forest between the rivers Saale and Mulde to the Bishop of Merseburg in year 974.

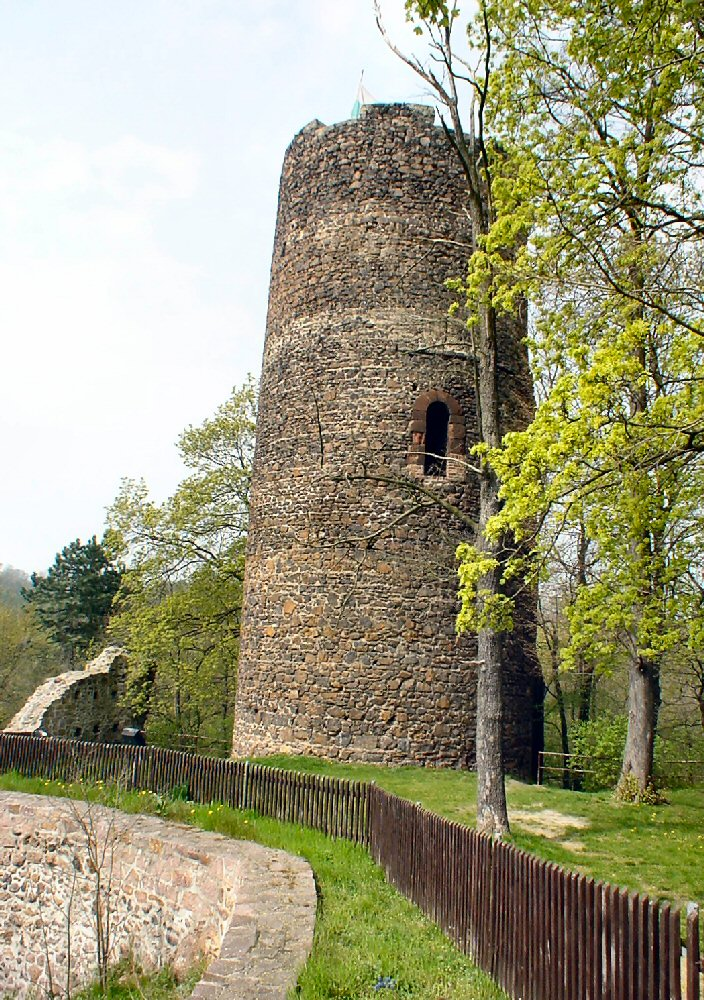
Kohren Castle, Bergfried
