= Narsdorf =

- Ortsteil of Geithain
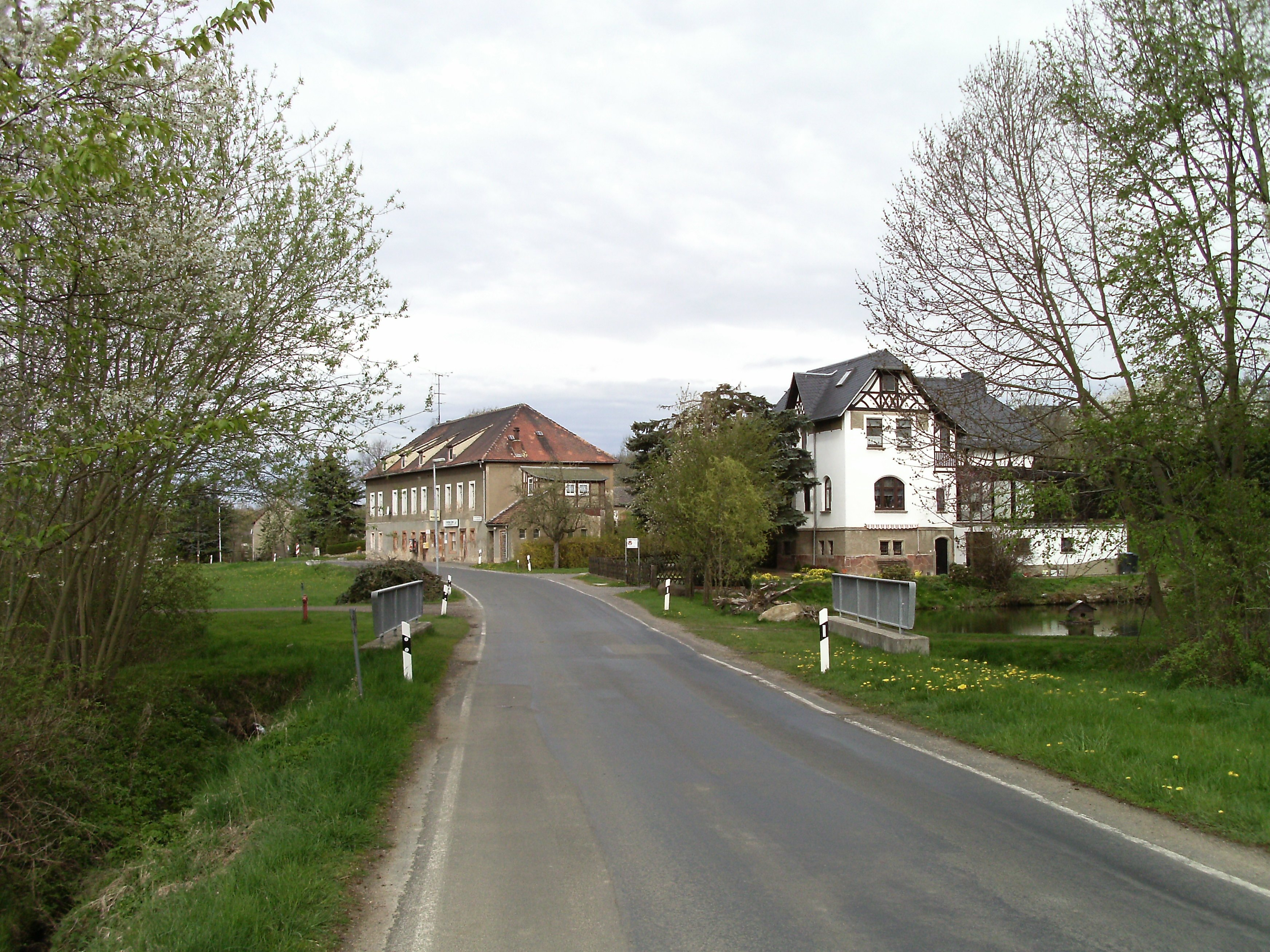
- Street in Narsdorf (2012)
- Interactive map of Narsdorf
- Location within Germany Location within Saxony
- Coordinates: 51°1′N 12°43′E
- Country: Germany
- State: Saxony
- District: Leipzig
- Town: Geithain

Area
  - Total: 24.49 km^{2} (9.46 sq mi)
- Elevation: 252 m (827 ft)

Population (2015-12-31)
  - Total: 1,659
  - Density: 67.74/km^{2} (175.5/sq mi)
- Time zone: UTC+01:00 (CET)
  - Summer (DST): UTC+02:00 (CEST)
- Postal codes: 04657
- Dialling codes: 034346, 034341

Narsdorf is a former municipality in the Leipzig district, in Saxony, Germany. As of 1 July 2017 Narsdorf has been incorporated into Geithain. The villages of Ossa (with Bruchheim, Kolka, Wenigossa, and Niederpickenhain), and Rathendorf (with Oberpickenhain) had been incorporated administratively into Narsdorf in 1996, while nearby Seifersdorf had already been incorporated in 1934 and Dölitzsch in 1973.

== Geography ==
Narsdorf is located about 42 km south-southeast of Leipzig and 25 km north-northwest of Chemnitz on Bundesstraße B175 and motorway A 72, immediately west of Wechselburg and south of Geithain. It has a station on the Neukieritzsch–Chemnitz railway. With the exception of Dölitzsch in the southeast, most of the incorporated communities lie to the west of Narsdorf proper.

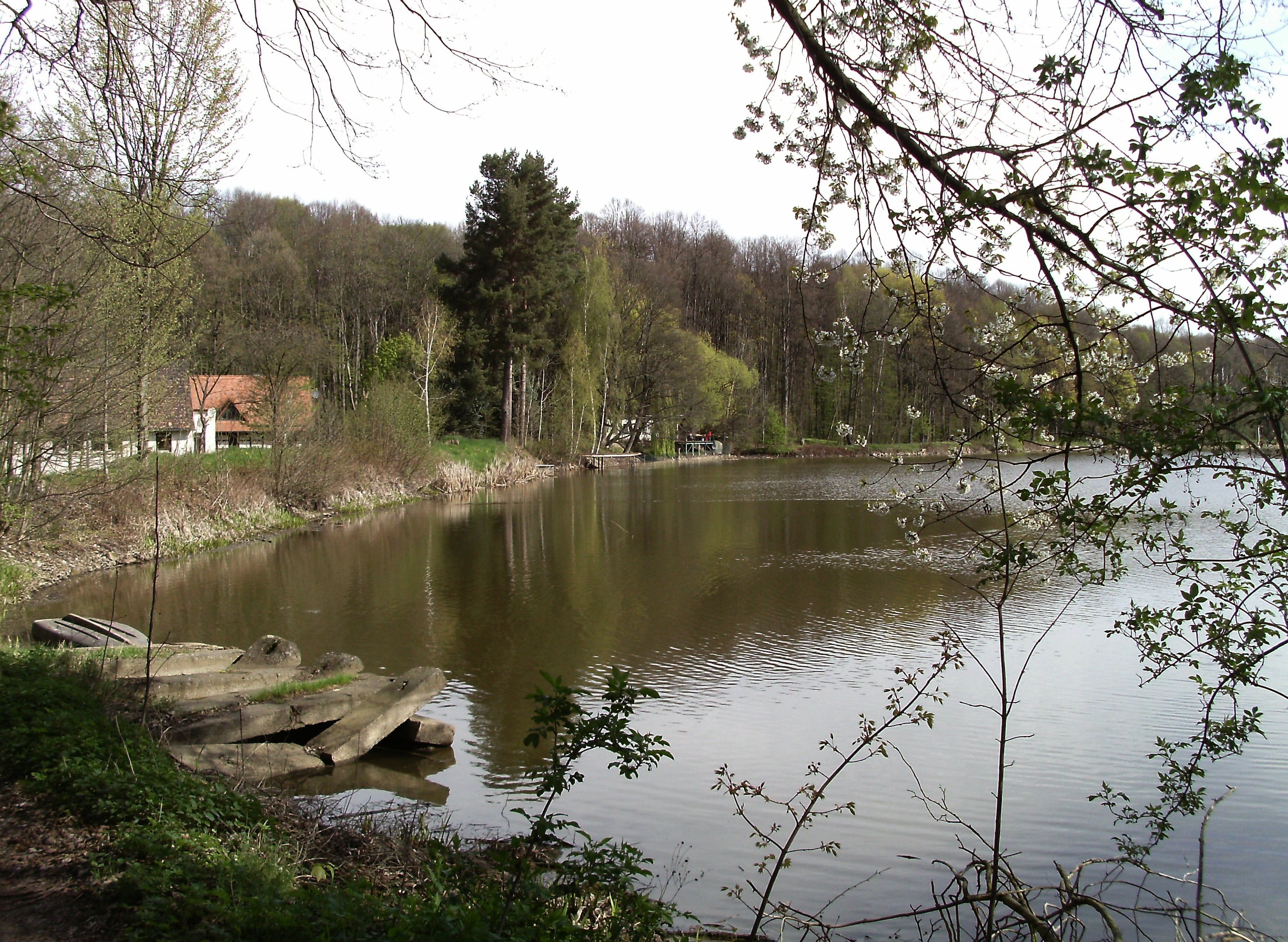
Hegeteich, a large pond in Narsdorf municipality

Narsdorf is situated in the landscape of Kohrener Land which is part of the Central Saxon Hills and the Saxon Loess country. The area is rich in clay which is mined and processed into roof tiles. Woodlands are mainly found in the western part of the municipality. Bodies of water include ponds and a flooded clay pit as well as several streams of which Katze and Ratte are the main ones.

== History ==
The oldest recorded part of Narsdorf is the Waldhufendorf Seifersdorf which was first mentioned as Sifridesdorp in a document of 1208. Until the 18th century it was partly administrated by the magistrate of Geithain and the Ämter of Borna (Syhra manor) and Rochlitz (Ossa manor). In 1934 it was incorporated into Narsdorf.

The Waldhufendorf Narsdorf itself was first mentioned in 1350 as Nordinsdorff and was founded during the German eastward expansion in the 13th century as a settlement in a woodland clearing. Around 1424 it is supposed to have been temporarily abandoned due to a plague outbreak. In the early modern period it belonged to Amt Rochlitz.

Dölitzsch, a clustered settlement, was also first mentioned in 1350. It was part of Königsfeld manor in Amt Rochlitz and joined Narsdorf municipality in 1973.

Ossa, the seat of a former manor and temporarily also referred to as Großossa, which had incorporated Wenigossa with Niederpickenhain, Bruchheim, and Kolka in 1948, joined Narsdorf municipality in 1996 together with Rathendorf, which had incorporated Oberpickenhain in 1956.

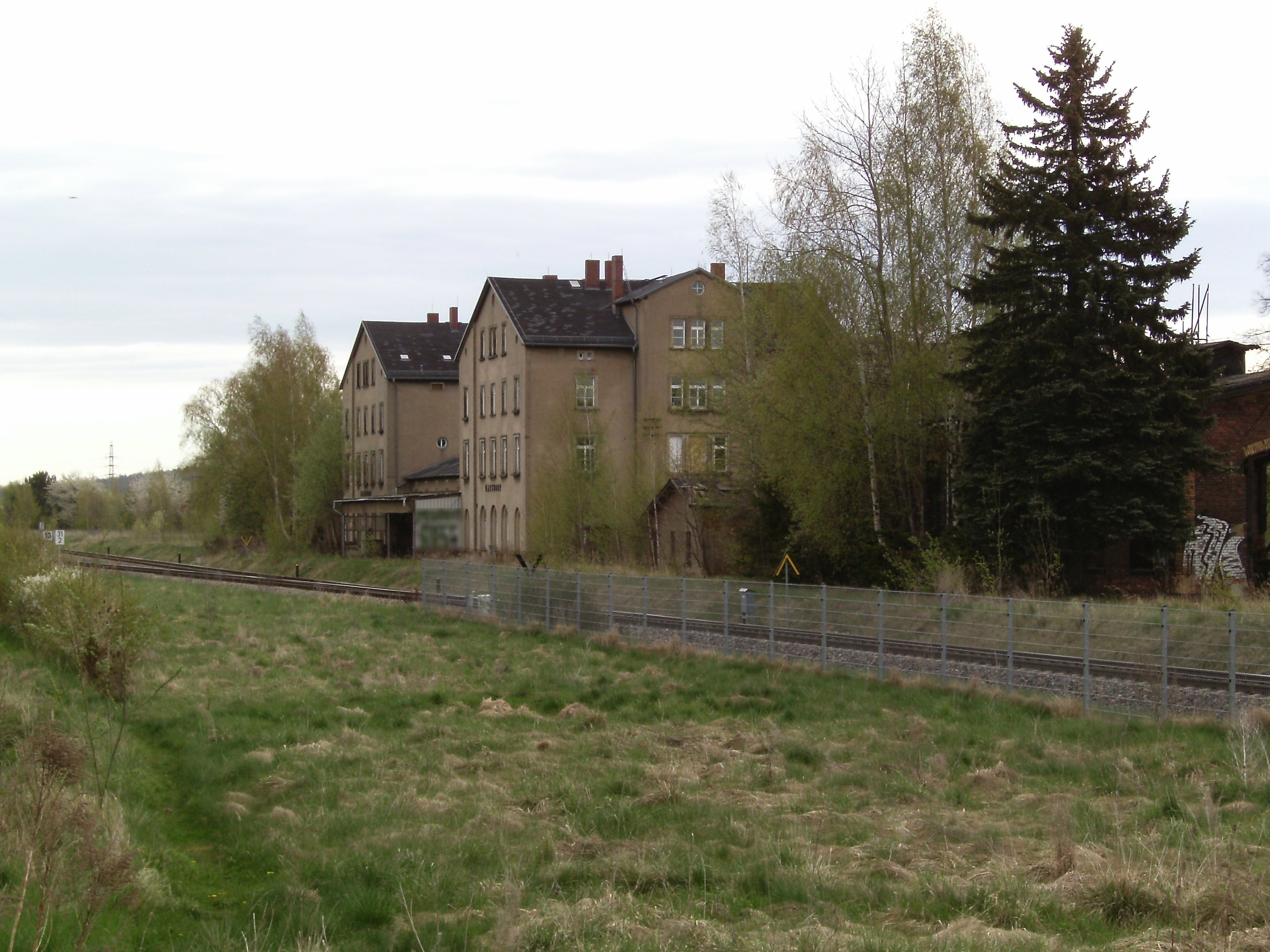
Old station buildings

In 1872 the railway station (only a halt since 2006) was opened together with the branch line to Penig and Rochlitz which closed in sections between 1991 and 2000. The section of motorway A 72 between Rochlitz junction and Borna was opened in 2013.
