= Wyhra =

River in Germany

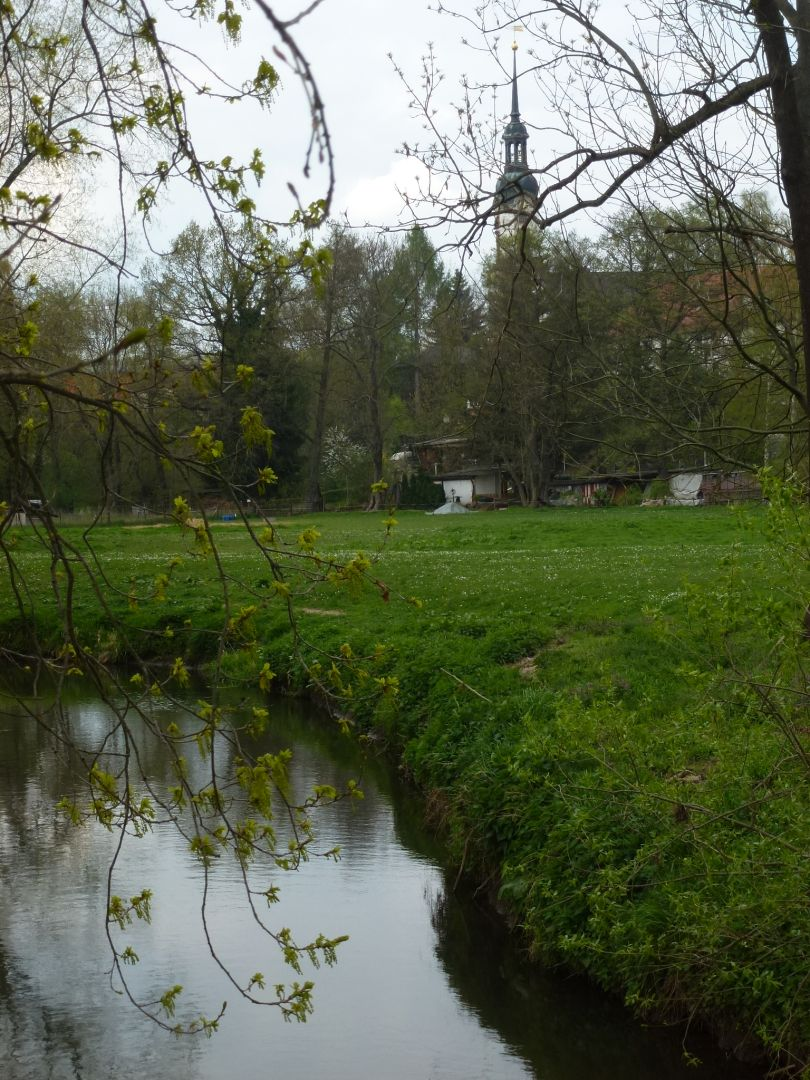
- The Wyhra in Zedtlitz

Location
- Country: Germany
- States: Saxony and Thuringia

Physical characteristics
- Mouth
  - location: Pleiße
  - coordinates: 51.1461°N 12.4436°E

Basin features
- Progression: Pleiße→ White Elster→ Saale→ Elbe→ North Sea

The Wyhra (in its upper course: Wiera) is a river of Saxony and Thuringia, Germany. It is a right tributary of the Pleiße, which it joins near Lobstädt.

== See also ==
- List of rivers of Saxony
- List of rivers of Thuringia
