= Frohburg =

- Town
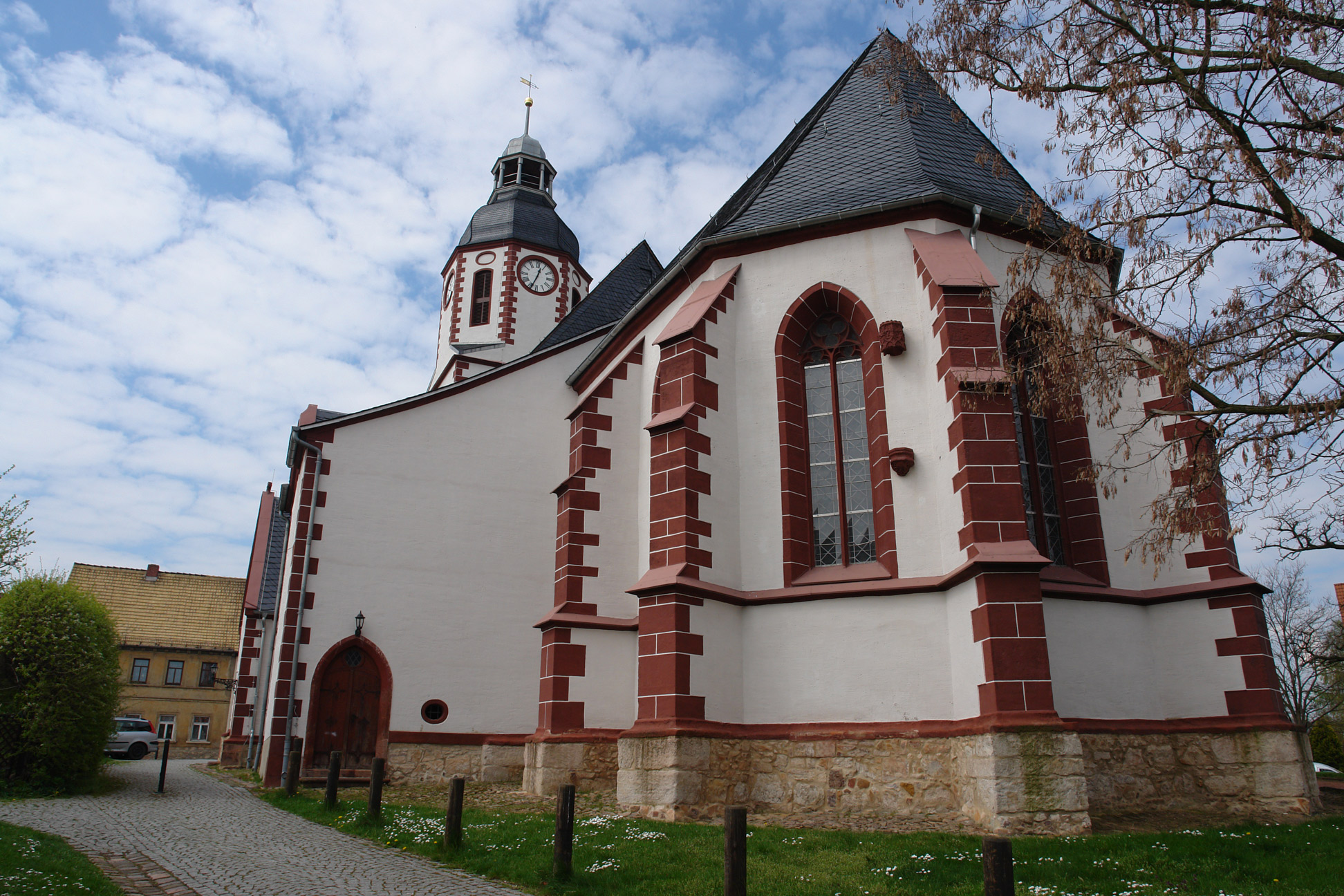
- Church of St. Michael

- Coat of arms

- Location of Frohburg within Leipzig district
- Interactive map of Frohburg
- Location within Germany Location within Saxony
- Coordinates: 51°3′22″N 12°33′18″E
- Country: Germany
- State: Saxony
- District: Leipzig
- Subdivisions: 18

Government
  - Mayor (2021–28): Karsten Richter (CDU)

Area
  - Total: 145.31 km^{2} (56.10 sq mi)
- Elevation: 176 m (577 ft)

Population (2025-12-31)
  - Total: 11,975
  - Density: 82.410/km^{2} (213.44/sq mi)
- Time zone: UTC+01:00 (CET)
  - Summer (DST): UTC+02:00 (CEST)
- Postal codes: 04654
- Dialling codes: 034348
- Vehicle registration: L, BNA, GHA, GRM, MTL, WUR
- Website: www.frohburg.de

Frohburg (German pronunciation: [ˈfʁoːˌbʊʁk]) is a town in the Leipzig district, in Saxony, Germany. It is situated 11 km northeast of Altenburg, and 34 km southeast of Leipzig. It includes the village of Flößberg and the town Kohren-Sahlis.

== History ==
Frohburg castle was first mentioned in documents at the end of the 10th century, the first documentary mention of the settlement itself dates from 1198, and in 1233 it is known as a town (oppidum), although it had no explicit town privileges and was directly ruled by the lord of the castle, which at this time was the burgrave of Altenburg. Town privileges were only awarded to Frohburg in 1831, and the first mayor elected three years later.

Until the mid-16th century, Frohburg was part of Pflege Altenburg, and from then on until 1856 of Amt Borna. From then on it was the centre of the judicial district (Gerichtsamt) Frohburg, until it passed to Amtshauptmannschaft (district) Borna.

Following a recession in the 19th century, the establishment of a calico printing mill in 1883 and the start of lignite mining north of the town helped economic recovery.

During World War II, a satellite camp of Buchenwald concentration camp was located just outside the village of Flößberg. The forced labour camp was a branch of the Leipzig-based arms manufacturer, Hugo Schneider AG (HASAG).

In 1960, the first motorcycle race on Frohburger Dreieck took place, and in 1962 the first motocross competition on the track Am Kaplanberg.

The neighbouring community of Streitwald was incorporated into the town in 1973, followed by Greifenhain in 1995, Benndorf in 1997, and Eschefeld, Frauendorf, Roda, Nenkersdorf and Schönau in 1999. On 1 January 2008 Frohburg and the community of Eulatal formed an administrative collectivity which ended a year later when Eulatal joined the community of Frohburg. The town of Kohren-Sahlis was incorporated into the town in 2018.

== Geography and Transport ==
=== Geography ===
Frohburg lies approximately halfway between Leipzig and Chemnitz, ca. 35 km south of Leipzig and 10 km south of Borna. The stream Wyhra flows through Frohburg.

=== Transport ===
A south-north section of former B 95 connecting Chemnitz and Leipzig, now reclassified as state road S 51, runs through Frohburg. South of the town it intersects with B 7, running west from Rochlitz. The Neukieritzsch–Chemnitz railway, with trains between Leipzig and Geithain currently operated by Transdev, has a station in the town. The Frohburg junction of state road S 11 with A 72 is currently (2016) under construction.

=== Demographics ===
Total population figures from 31 December 2018: 12,699

Village	Inhabitants
Stadt Frohburg	3,863
Kohren-Sahlis	992
Prießnitz	723
Greifenhain	631
Frankenhain	596
Flößberg	582
Eschefeld	508
Tautenhain	459
Benndorf	414
Roda	351
Frauendorf	348
Gnandstein	300
Streitwald	292
Hopfgarten	266
Nenkersdorf	256
Schönau	244
Rüdigsdorf	210
Terpitz	200
Altmörbitz	194
Dolsenhain	187
Elbisbach	185
Bubendorf	174
Jahnshain	149
Trebishain	145
Linda	122
Ottenhain	94
Pflug	45
Meusdorf	44
Neuhof	43
Walditz	33
Wüstenhain	30
Alt-Ottenhain	15
Eckersberg	4

== Sons and daughters of the town ==
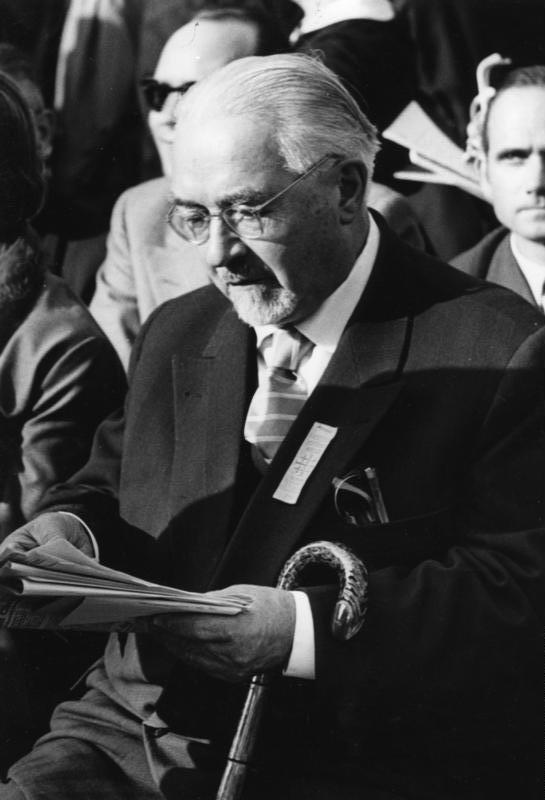
Otto Nuschke 1956

- Johannes Schmidt (1861-1926) German classical philologist and high school teacher.
- Otto Nuschke (1883-1957), politician and CDU - chairman in the Soviet occupation zone
- Guntram Vesper (born 1941), writer, his novel Frohburg received the Preis der Leipziger Buchmesse in 2016
- Richard Schröder (born 1943), theologian and philosopher

== Personalities who have worked on the ground ==
- Kunz von Kauffungen (1410-1455), Saxon nobleman, knight and military commander, lived from 1552 to 1555 in Wolftitz castle
- Hans Pfitzner (1869-1949), German composer, conductor and author of political and theoretical writings, honorary citizen of Frohburg
- Conrad Felixmüller (1897-1977), painter, lived in Tautenhain from 1944 to 1967 and created in 1951/52 the galleries for the church
- Frauke Petry (born 1975), chemist, politician, AfD - chairman, lived in the district of Tautenhain
