= Neukieritzsch =

- Municipality
- Coat of arms

- Location of Neukieritzsch within Leipzig district
- Interactive map of Neukieritzsch
- Location within Germany Location within Saxony
- Coordinates: 51°9′5″N 12°24′35″E
- Country: Germany
- State: Saxony
- District: Leipzig
- Subdivisions: 5

Government
  - Mayor (2022–29): Thomas Meckel (SPD)

Area
  - Total: 56.96 km^{2} (21.99 sq mi)
- Elevation: 143 m (469 ft)

Population (2025-12-31)
  - Total: 7,119
  - Density: 125.0/km^{2} (323.7/sq mi)
- Time zone: UTC+01:00 (CET)
  - Summer (DST): UTC+02:00 (CEST)
- Postal codes: 04575
- Dialling codes: 03 43 42
- Vehicle registration: L
- Website: www.neukieritzsch.de

Neukieritzsch is a municipality in the Leipzig district, in Saxony, Germany. On 1 April 2008, the former municipality of Lobstädt was incorporated into Neukieritzsch. On 1 July 2014, the former municipality of Deutzen was incorporated into Neukieritzsch.

== Geography and Transport ==
Neukieritzsch lies in the Leipzig Basin approximately 25 km south of Leipzig and 9 km north west of Borna.

== Demographics ==
=== Historical Population ===
Population (as of 31 December each year):

1998: 4418; 1999: 4183; 2000: 3908; 2001: 3740; 2002: 3700	2003: 3651; 2004: 3384; 2007: 5938; 2009: 5740; 2012: 5406	2013: 5327; 2014: 6897

Data: Statistical Office of Saxony

== Economy and Infrastructure ==
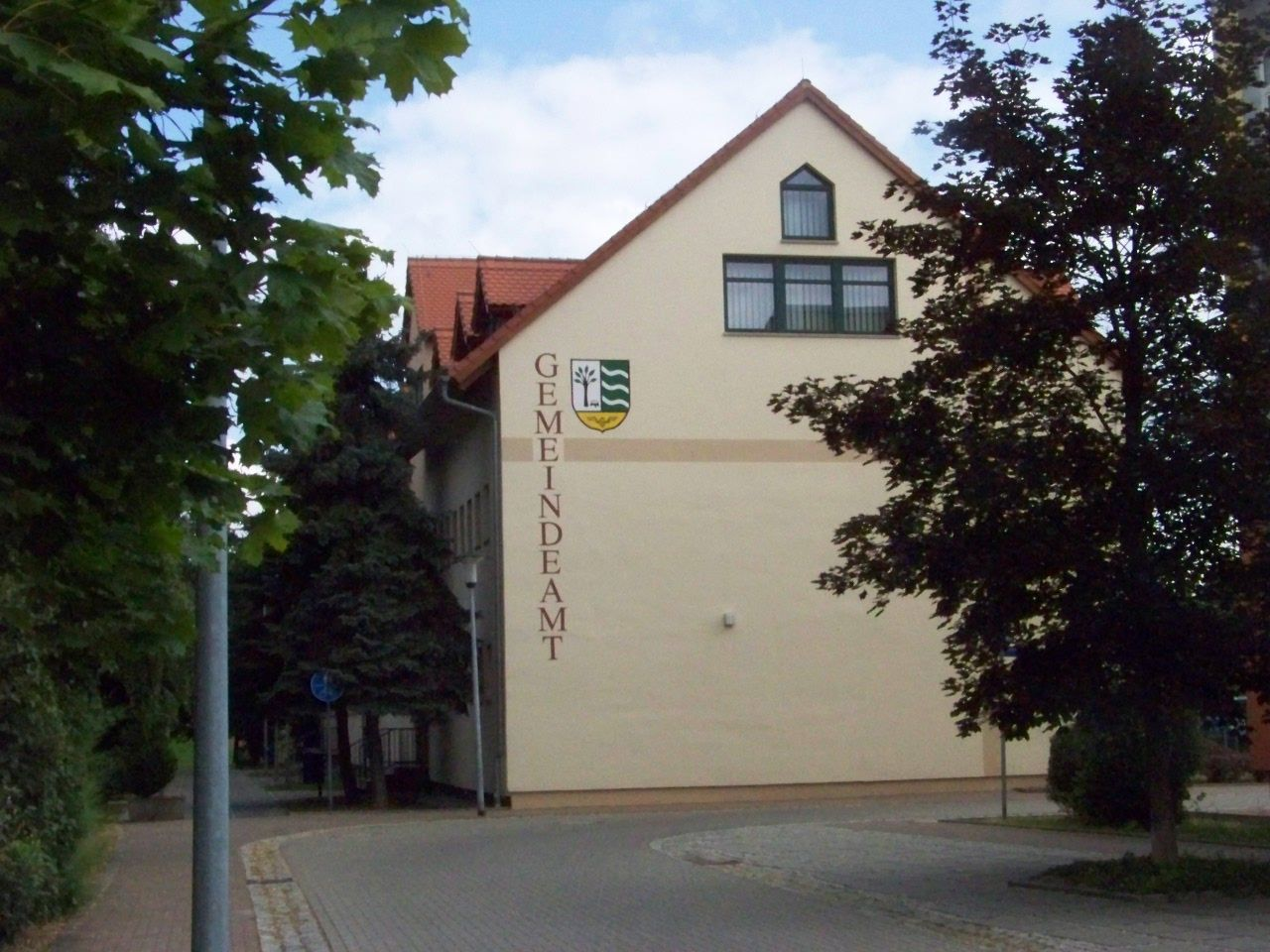
Municipal office

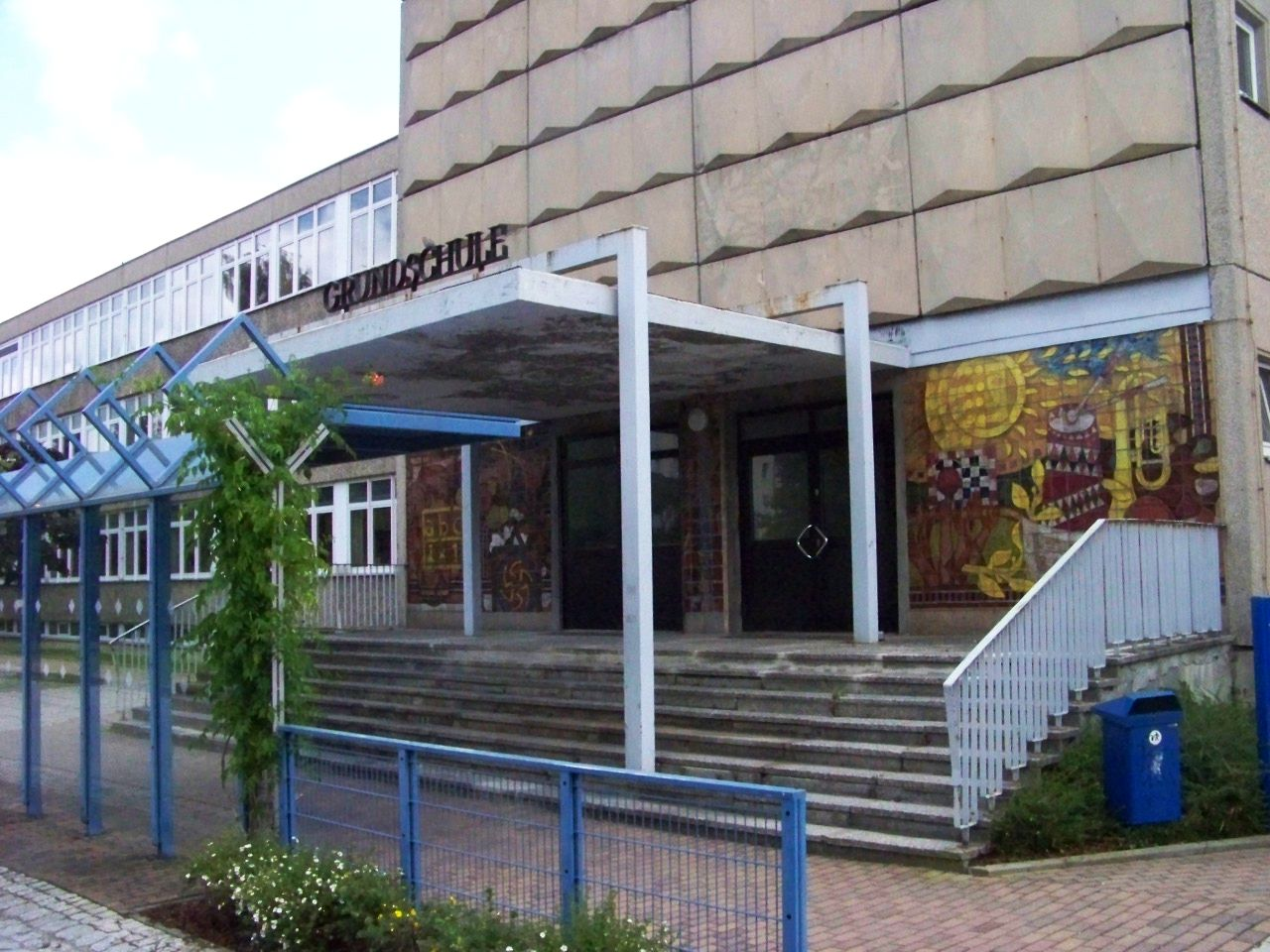
School

Neukieritzsch station is situated on the Leipzig–Hof railway of the Saxon Bavarian Railway Company and the Neukieritzsch–Chemnitz railway, as well as the former Neukieritzsch–Pegau railway.
