= Regis-Breitingen =

- Town
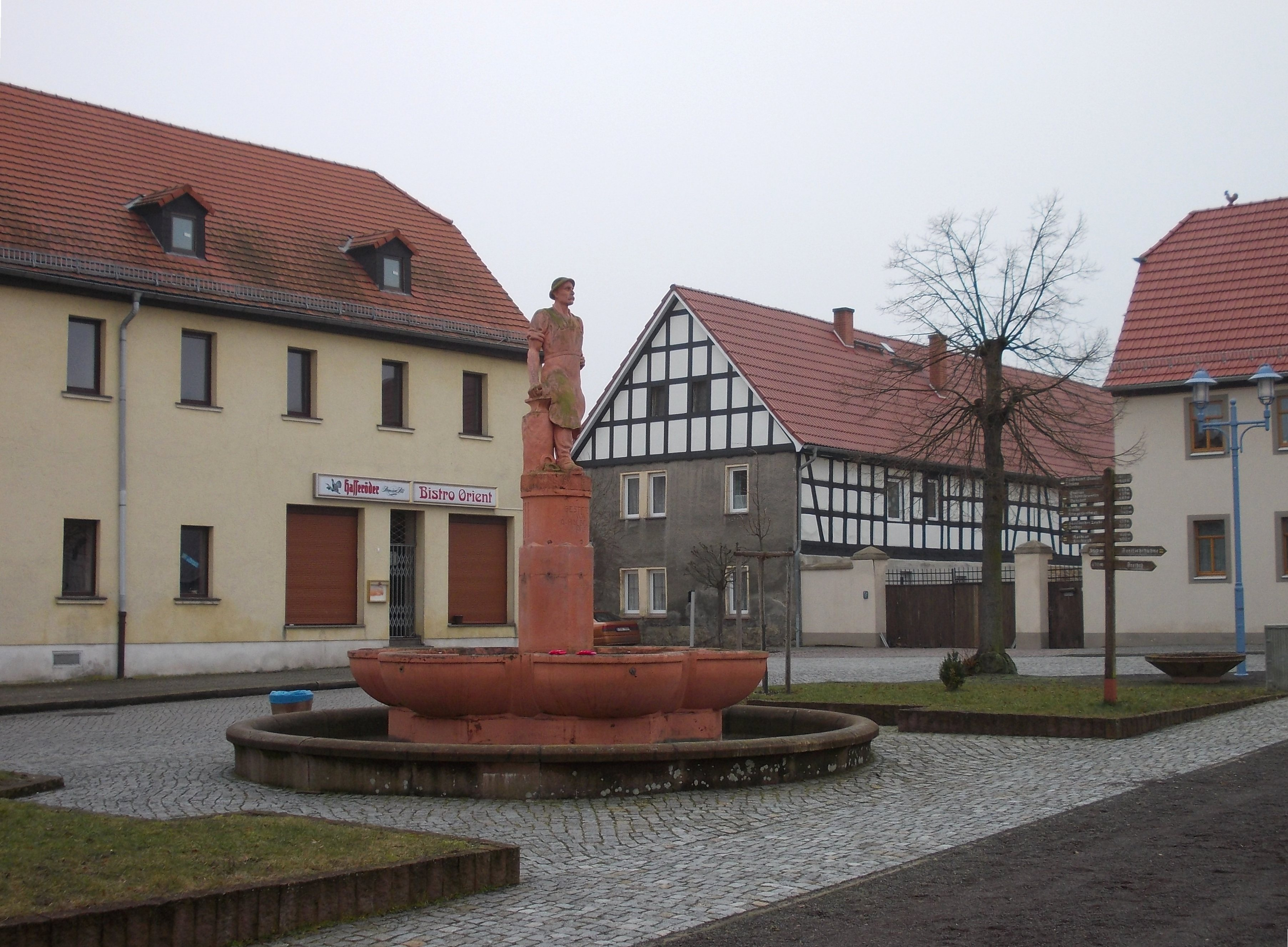

- Coat of arms

- Location of Regis-Breitingen within Leipzig district
- Interactive map of Regis-Breitingen
- Location within Germany Location within Saxony
- Coordinates: 51°5′N 12°27′E
- Country: Germany
- State: Saxony
- District: Leipzig
- Subdivisions: 3

Government
  - Mayor (2020–27): Jörg Zetzsche

Area
  - Total: 26.37 km^{2} (10.18 sq mi)
- Elevation: 145 m (476 ft)

Population (2025-12-31)
  - Total: 3,697
  - Density: 140.2/km^{2} (363.1/sq mi)
- Time zone: UTC+01:00 (CET)
  - Summer (DST): UTC+02:00 (CEST)
- Postal codes: 04565 04574
- Dialling codes: 034343 (Regis-Breitingen); 034492 (Ramsdorf); 03433 (Heuersdorf)
- Vehicle registration: L, BNA, GHA, GRM, MTL, WUR
- Website: www.regis-breitingen.de

Regis-Breitingen (German pronunciation: [ˈʁeːɡɪs ˈbʁaɪtɪŋən]) is a town in the Leipzig district, in Saxony, Germany. It is situated on the river Pleiße, 6 km southwest of Borna.
