= Kohren-Sahlis =

- Ortsteil of Frohburg
- Coat of arms
- Interactive map of Kohren-Sahlis
- Location within Germany Location within Saxony
- Coordinates: 51°1′7″N 12°36′16″E
- Country: Germany
- State: Saxony
- District: Leipzig
- Town: Frohburg
- Subdivisions: 4

Area
  - Total: 36.72 km^{2} (14.18 sq mi)
- Elevation: 233 m (764 ft)

Population (2015-12-31)
  - Total: 2,611
  - Density: 71.11/km^{2} (184.2/sq mi)
- Time zone: UTC+01:00 (CET)
  - Summer (DST): UTC+02:00 (CEST)
- Postal codes: 04655
- Dialling codes: 034344
- Vehicle registration: L
- Website: www.kohren-sahlis.de

Kohren-Sahlis is a town and a former municipality in the Leipzig district, in Saxony, Germany. Since January 2018, it is part of the town Frohburg. It is situated 14 km southeast of Borna, and 31 km northwest of Chemnitz.

== History ==
The first documented mention of Kohren-Sahlis was in 974.

=== Nazi Era ===
From 1 November 1942 to 14 April 1945 the children's home "Sonnenwiese" (Sunny Meadow), which was operated by the SS Lebensborn organization, was located in Kohren-Salis. Primarily children abducted from Norway were placed here before they were passed on for adoption to families loyal to the Nazi system .

=== Religion ===
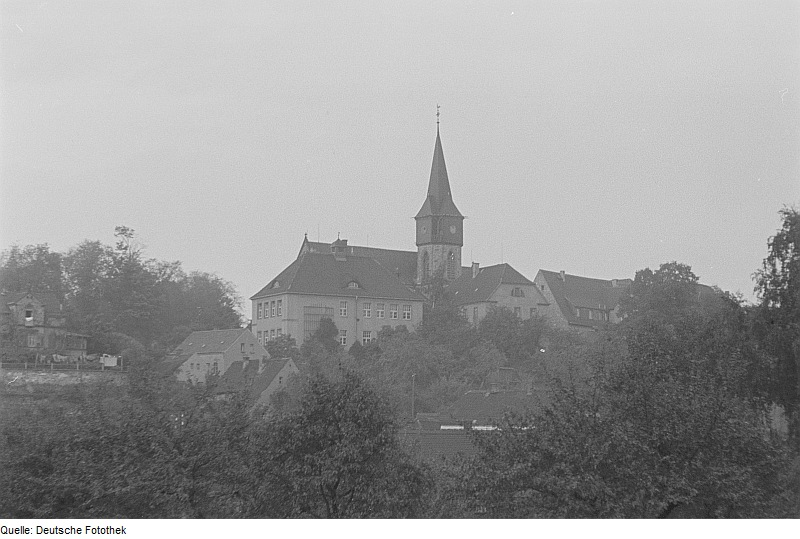
The St. Gangulphus Church in 1952

Kohren-Sahlis is situated in a traditional Lutheran area. The Saint Gangulphus Church in Kohren-Sahlis, the Christ Church in Rüdigsdorf, the Village Churches in Altmörbitz and Gnandstein as well as the Chapel of Gnandstein Castle all belong to the Kohren Region Parish of the Evangelical-Lutheran Church of Saxony.

The few Catholics in Kohren-Sahlis belong to St. Joseph's Parish of Borna, Bishopric of Dresden-Meissen.

== Culture and Attractions ==
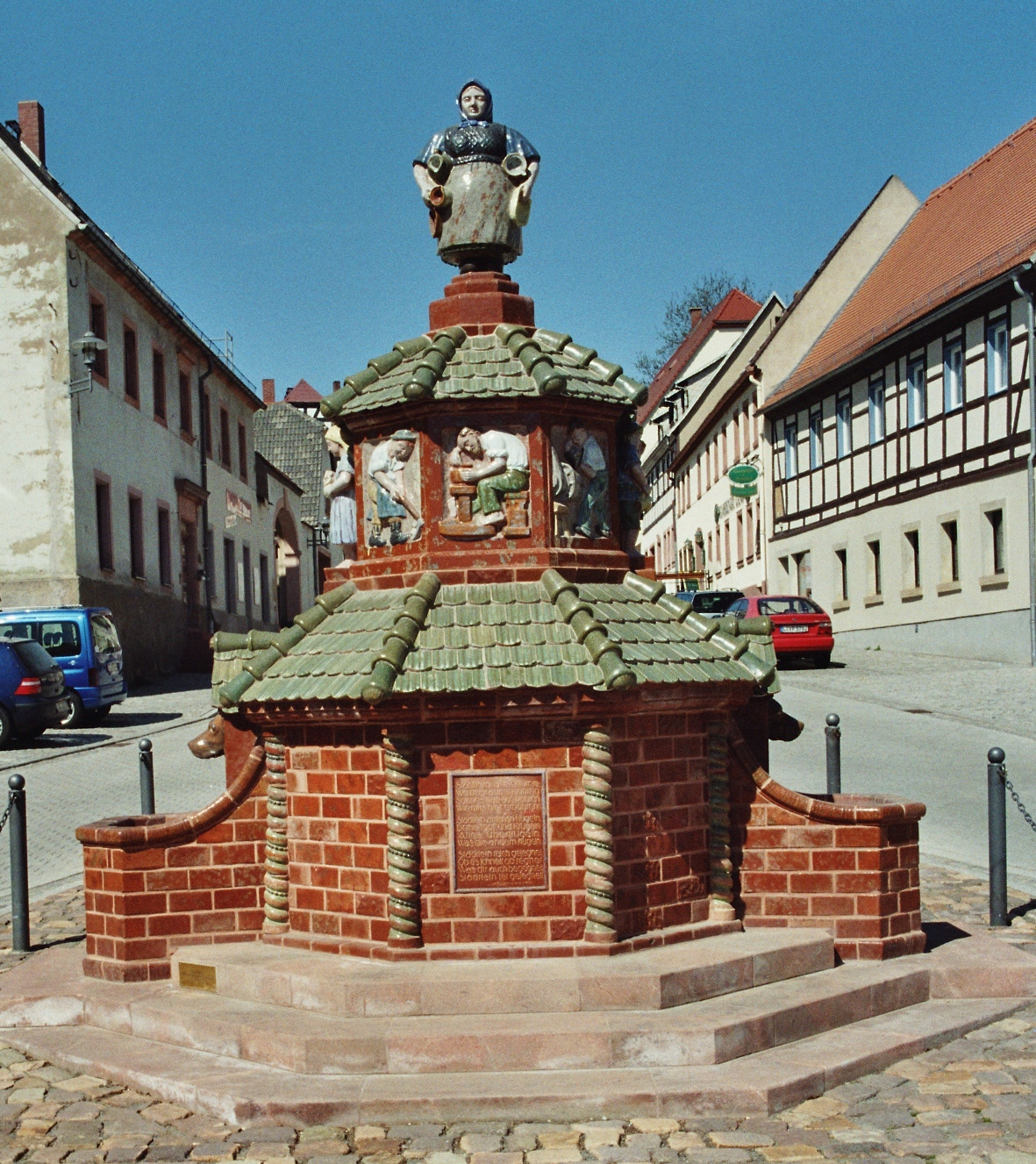
Ceramic Fountain in the Market Square, Kohren-Sahlis

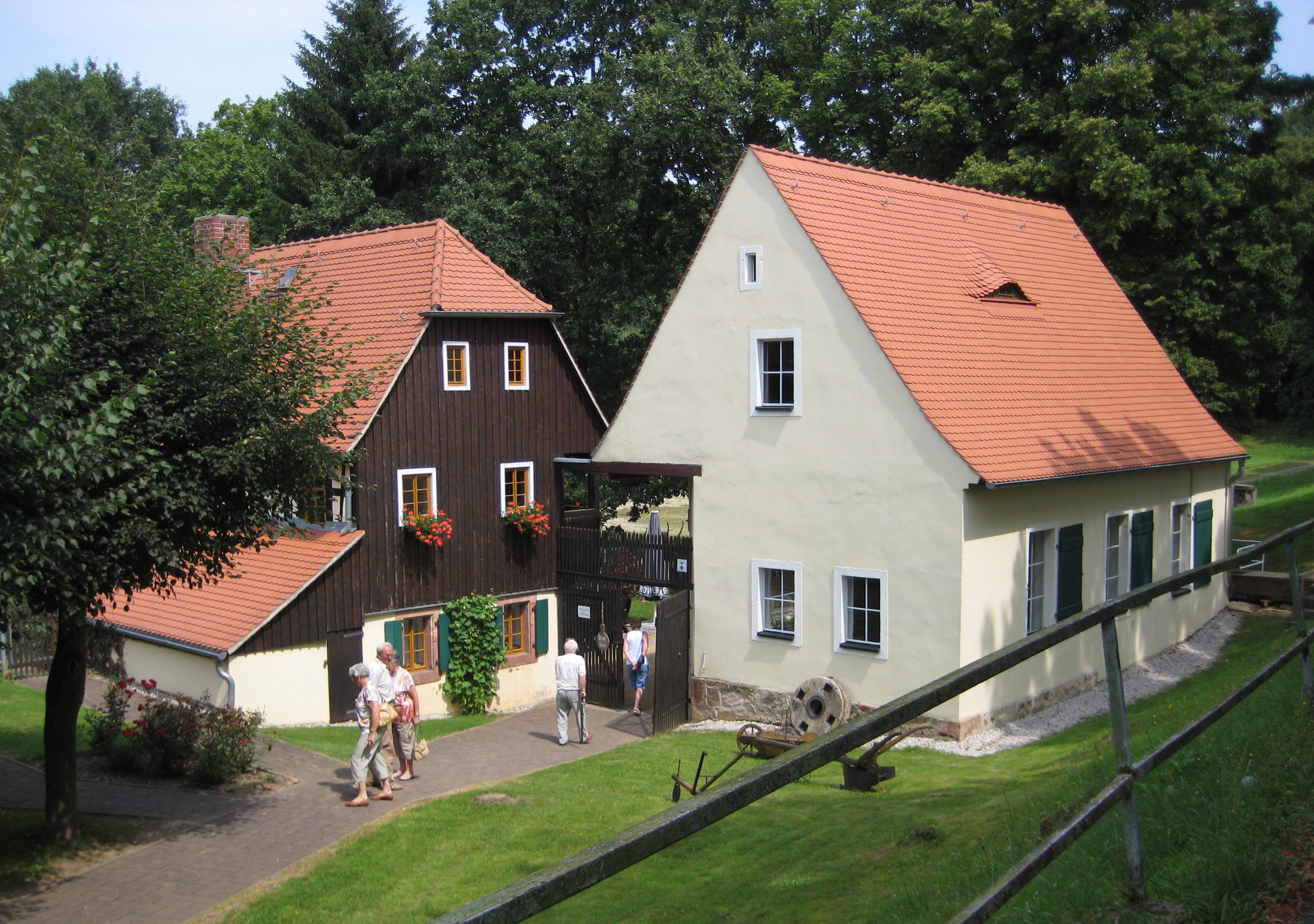
Mill museum Lindigtmühle

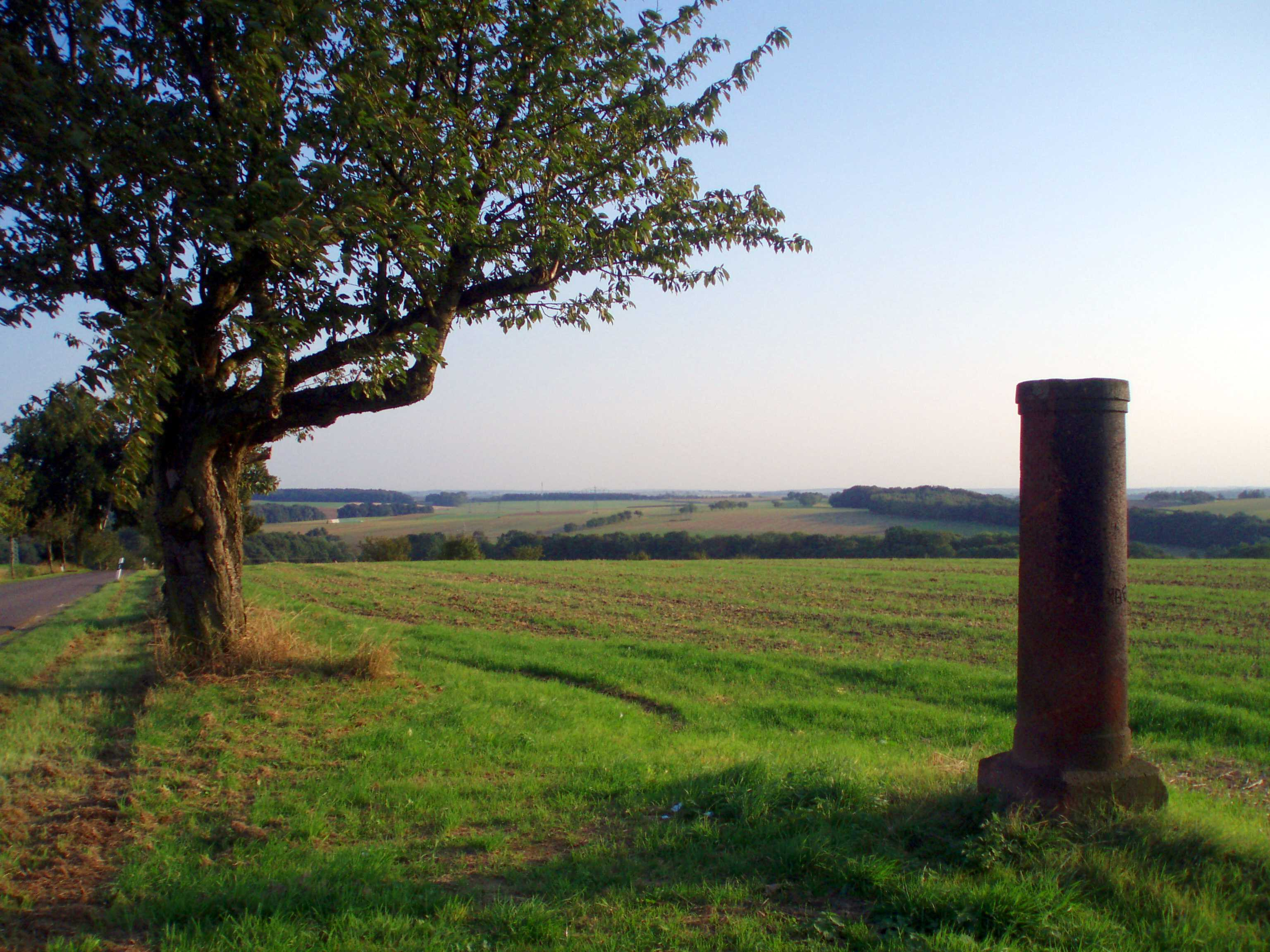
Triangulation Pillar "Sahlis near Frohburg"

=== Museums ===
- Pottery museum
- Hoffmann’sche Collection Museum
- Gnandstein Castle Museum

=== Monuments and Buildings ===
- Ceramic fountain by Kurt Feuerriegel of (Frohburg), Market Square
- Ruins of Kohren Castle
- St. Gangolphus's Church in Kohren with rectory
- Gnandstein Castle
