= Lobstädt =

- Village of Neukieritzsch
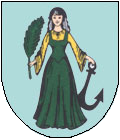
- Coat of arms
- Interactive map of Lobstädt
- Location within Germany Location within Saxony
- Coordinates: 51°08′00″N 12°26′58″E
- Country: Germany
- State: Saxony
- District: Leipziger Land
- Town: Neukieritzsch
- Subdivisions: 3

Area
  - Total: 24.27 km^{2} (9.37 sq mi)
- Elevation: 141 m (463 ft)

Population (2006-12-31)
  - Total: 2,661
  - Density: 109.6/km^{2} (284.0/sq mi)
- Time zone: UTC+01:00 (CET)
  - Summer (DST): UTC+02:00 (CEST)
- Postal codes: 04552
- Dialling codes: 03433
- Vehicle registration: L
- Website: www.lobstaedt.de

Lobstädt is a village and a former municipality in the Leipziger Land district, in Saxony, Germany. On April 1, 2008 Lobstädt was incorporated into Neukieritzsch.
