= Deutzen =

- Ortsteil of Neukieritzsch
- Interactive map of Deutzen
- Location within Germany Location within Saxony
- Coordinates: 51°6′41″N 12°25′33″E
- Country: Germany
- State: Saxony
- District: Leipzig
- Municipality: Neukieritzsch

Area
  - Total: 6.61 km^{2} (2.55 sq mi)
- Elevation: 143 m (469 ft)

Population (2012-12-31)
  - Total: 1,665
  - Density: 252/km^{2} (652/sq mi)
- Time zone: UTC+01:00 (CET)
  - Summer (DST): UTC+02:00 (CEST)
- Postal codes: 04574
- Dialling codes: 03 433
- Vehicle registration: L
- Website: www.deutzen.de

Deutzen is a village and a former municipality in the Leipzig district, in Saxony, Germany. Since 1 July 2014, it is part of the municipality Neukieritzsch.
