= Geithain =

- Town
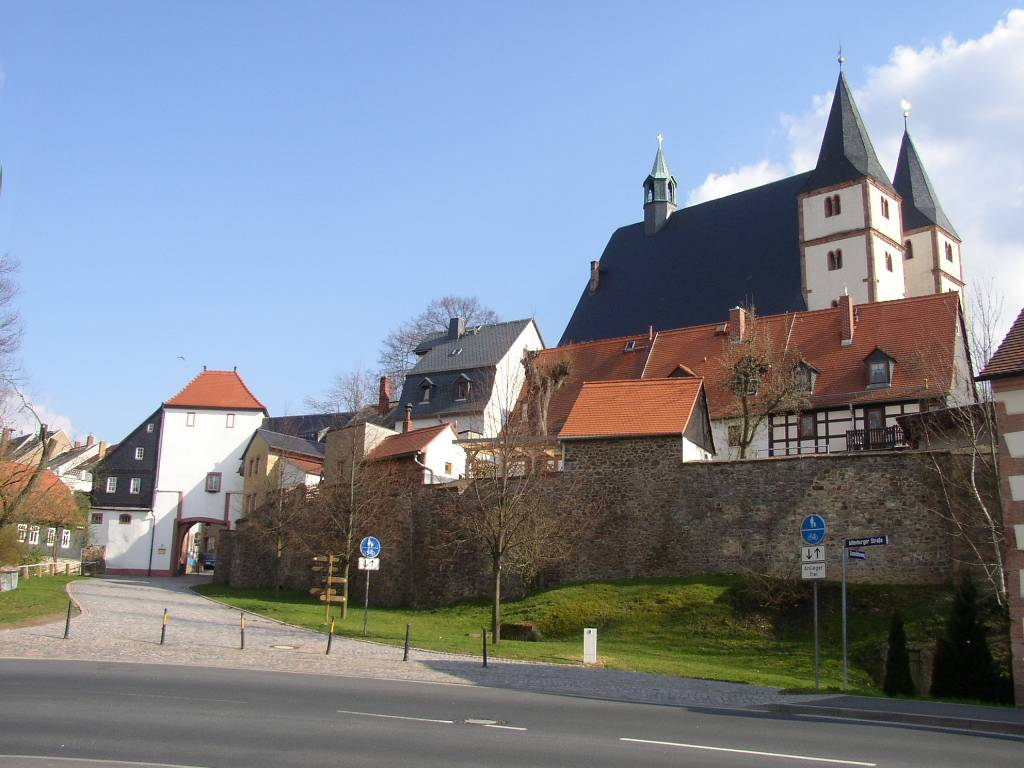
- Saint Nicholas Church

- Coat of arms

- Location of Geithain within Leipzig district
- Interactive map of Geithain
- Location within Germany Location within Saxony
- Coordinates: 51°3′N 12°41′E
- Country: Germany
- State: Saxony
- District: Leipzig
- Subdivisions: 10

Government
  - Mayor (2022–29): Frank Rudolph

Area
  - Total: 54.71 km^{2} (21.12 sq mi)
- Elevation: 225 m (738 ft)

Population (2025-12-31)
  - Total: 6,774
  - Density: 123.8/km^{2} (320.7/sq mi)
- Time zone: UTC+01:00 (CET)
  - Summer (DST): UTC+02:00 (CEST)
- Postal codes: 04643
- Dialling codes: 034341
- Vehicle registration: L, BNA, GHA, GRM, MTL, WUR
- Website: www.geithain.de

Geithain (German pronunciation: [ˈɡaɪtˌhaɪn]) is a town in the Leipzig district, in Saxony, Germany.

== Geography ==
Geithain is 30 km (19 mi) northwest of Chemnitz and 40 km (25 mi) southeast of Leipzig. It lies in hilly country by the wooded area Wickershain and the river Eula.

== History ==
The first documented mention of the town was in the year 1186 in a document, which described the donation of earnings from the Wickershainer Marion Church to the Bishop of Merseburg through the Duke Dedo III (Lausitz).

The name of the town has its origins in the Old Sorbian word "Chytan" (Chyten) and describes the place of Chyten, where "Chyt" (Chit) is a Sorbian first name.

In 1209 there was another documented mention of Geithain and the already established Nicolai Church. In this year the establishment of a hospital and a chapel (of St. James) was ordered by Duke Dedo III (1190–1210), the Margrave of Lausitz. Also, although Geithain is described as a town in this document, a charter with the first mayor (Hermanus Hongil) is first evident for the year 1335. From 1346 cisterns and wooden water conduits were constructed in Geithain, which were used until 1904.

Geithain was administered in the Middle Ages by a Vogt, who had his seat in the Freihof, first mentioned in 1349. The Geithain powder-tower, today one of the sights of the town, was part of the Freihof and was inserted with this into the town's fortifications.

1936 was the 750th anniversary of Geithain. They had a celebration for 3 days around 1 September.

In World War II the town had 219 dead. On 13 April 1945 alone 13 people were killed in a single air raid on the town. The target of the low-flying aircraft was the railway station. On 14 April the Second World War ended for Geithain with the arrival of American troops.

As of 1 July 2017 Narsdorf has been incorporated into Geithain together with its parts Bruchheim, Dölitzsch, Kolka, Narsdorf, Niederpickenhain, Oberpickenhain, Ossa, Rathendorf, and Wenigossa

== Transport ==
Geithain is located on Neukieritzsch–Chemnitz and Leipzig–Geithain railway lines, which connect at Geithain station.

In 2013 another section of federal motorway A 72 was opened, also connecting Geithain with exit no 23 and via B 7.

== Notable people ==
- Paul Guenther, (1860-1932), German-born American industrialist, emigrated to the US in 1890, in 1910 he was the largest stocking producer in the US
- Henning Frenzel, (born 1942), former football national player in the GDR
- Benjamin Hedericus (1675-1748), lexicographer
- Walter Risse, (1892-1965), officer, most recently general lieutenant in the Second World War
