= Kitzscher =

- Town
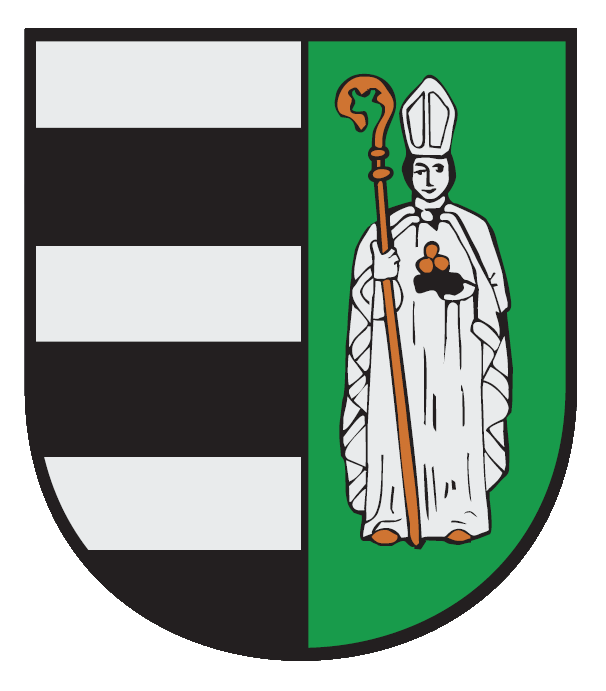
- Coat of arms

- Location of Kitzscher within Leipzig district
- Interactive map of Kitzscher
- Location within Germany Location within Saxony
- Coordinates: 51°9′52.11″N 12°33′12.60″E
- Country: Germany
- State: Saxony
- District: Leipzig
- Subdivisions: 5

Government
  - Mayor (2022–29): Maik Schramm (Ind.)

Area
  - Total: 29.04 km^{2} (11.21 sq mi)
- Elevation: 100 m (330 ft)

Population (2025-12-31)
  - Total: 5,226
  - Density: 180.0/km^{2} (466.1/sq mi)
- Time zone: UTC+01:00 (CET)
  - Summer (DST): UTC+02:00 (CEST)
- Postal codes: 04567
- Dialling codes: 03433
- Vehicle registration: L, BNA, GHA, GRM, MTL, WUR
- Website: www.kitzscher.de

Kitzscher (German pronunciation: [ˈkɪtʃɐ]) is a town in the Leipzig district, in Saxony, Germany.

== Geography ==
Kitzscher is situated in the Leipziger Tieflandsbucht, at the perimeter of the Central Saxon Hills. The town is situated 6 km northeast of Borna, and 24 km southeast of Leipzig. A nearby slagheap from open cast mining called the 'Halde Trages' is one of the highest points in the vicinity and the main sight of interest in the locality.

== History ==
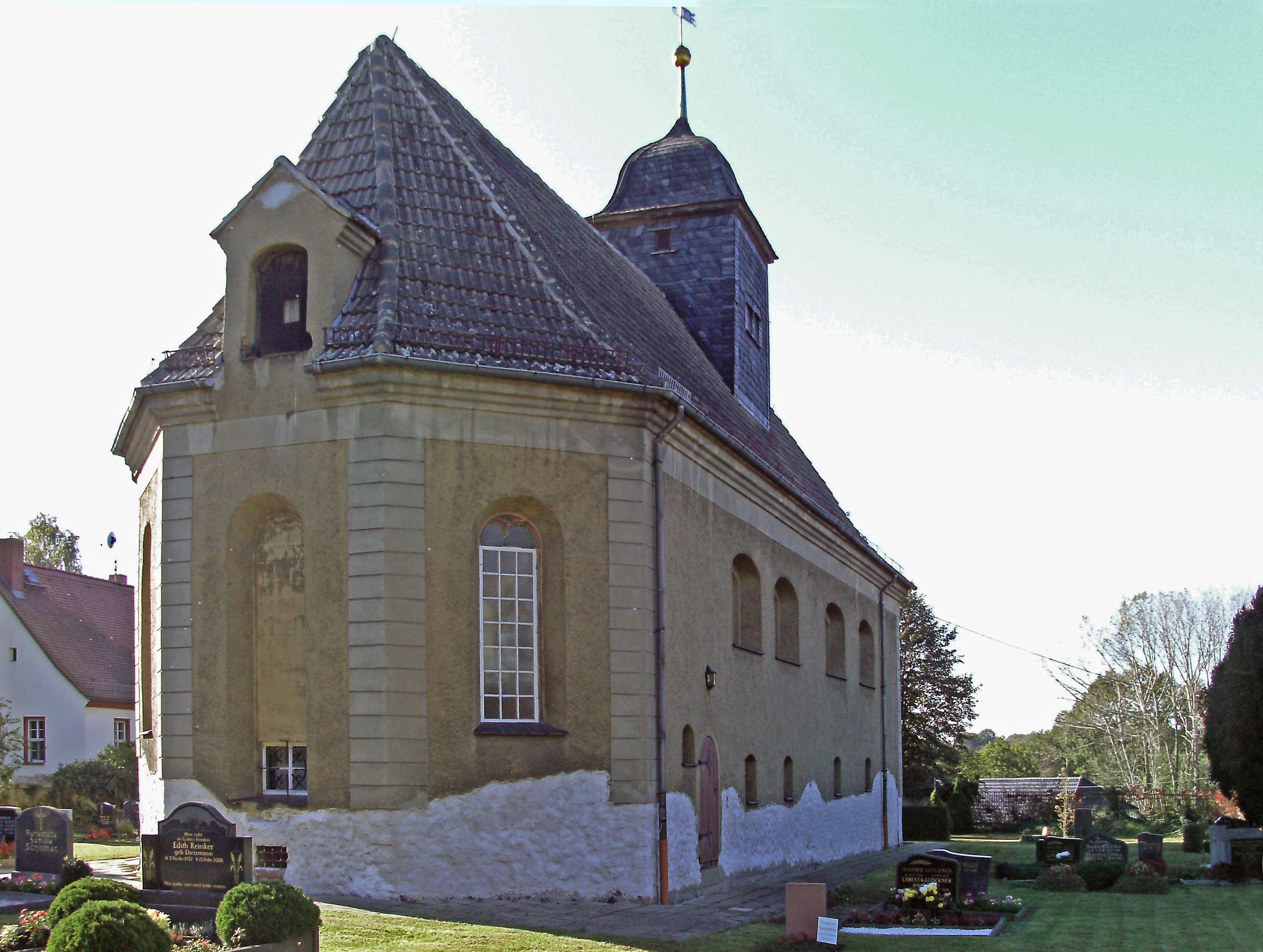
The little church in Kitzscher

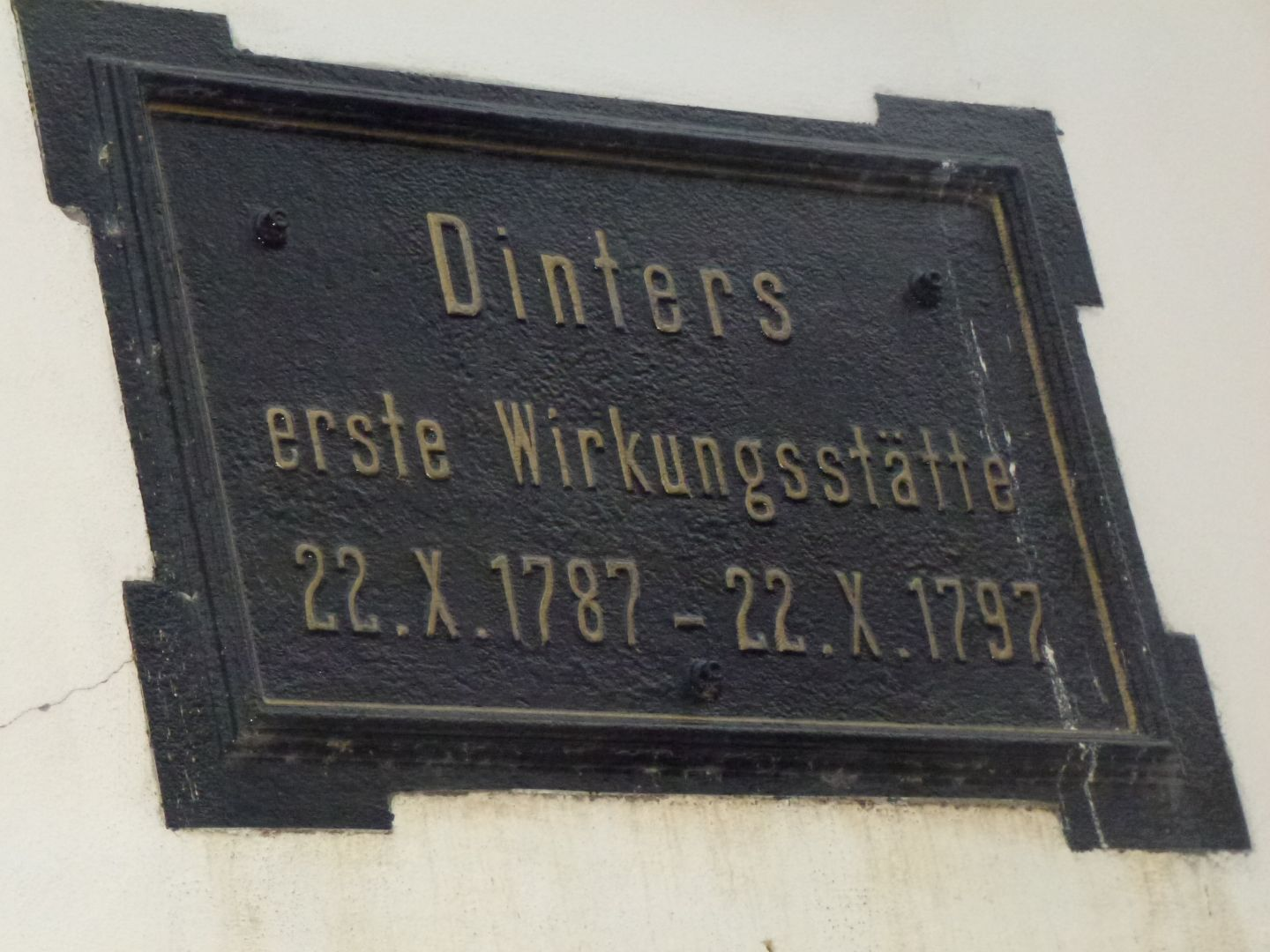
Plaque on the church school in memory of Dinter

The village was first mentioned in a charter document in the abbey at Grimma in the year 1251 which referred to a noble family, Guntherus de Kiczschere, which ultimately died out in 1676.

The oldest structure in the town is the church the origins of which date back to 1200.
