= Bodies of water in Leipzig =

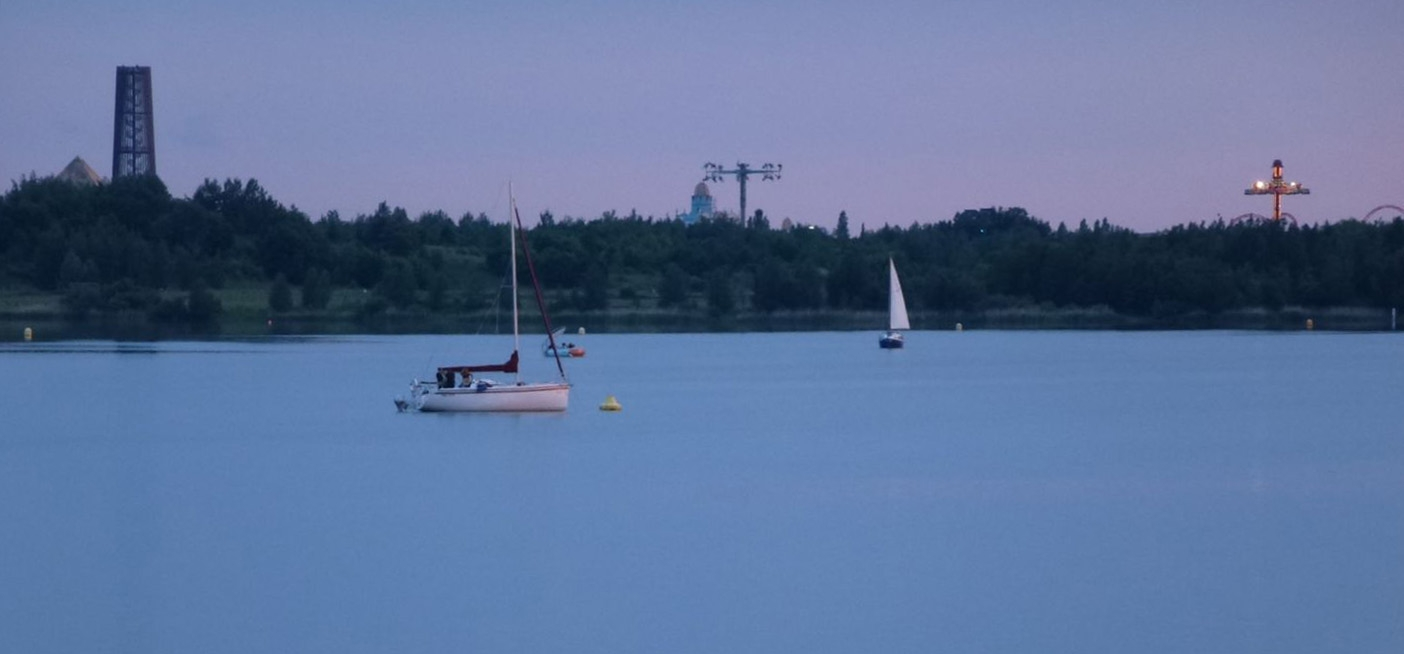
Lake Cospuden with Belantis in the background

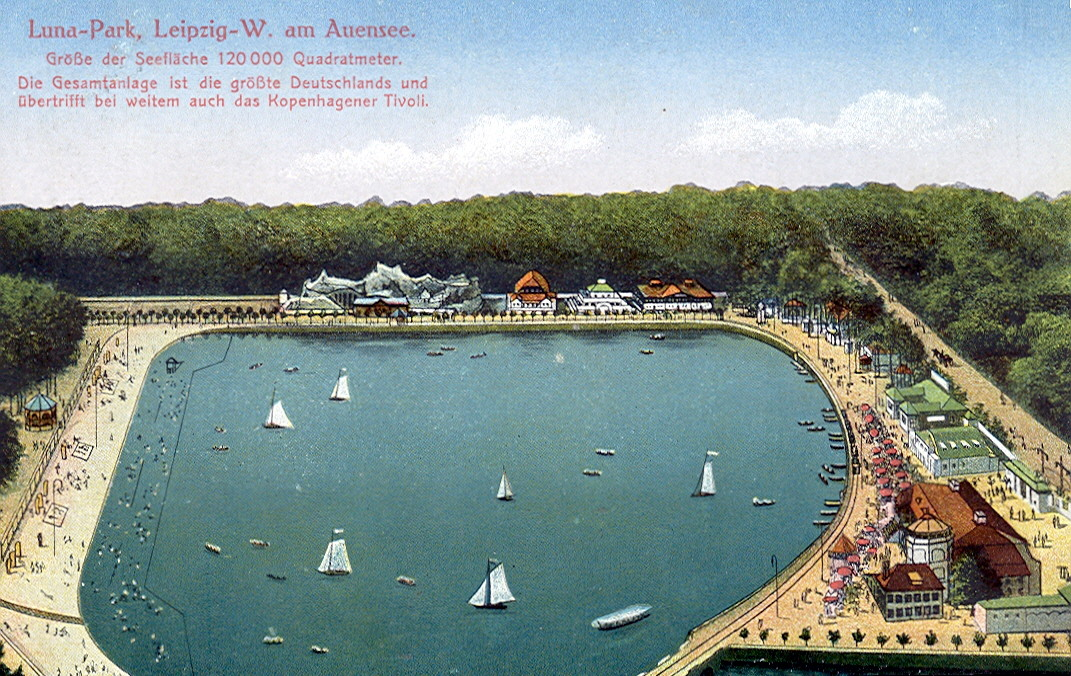
Auensee (around 1914)

Bodies of water in Leipzig are the rivers White Elster, Pleiße and Parthe as well as numerous streams with the Leipzig Riverside Forest in Leipzig, Germany. Many of these watercourses have been diverted, canalised or drained for economic use, to defend the city and to protect against flooding, and new ditches and canals have also been built. A large number of ponds and lakes have also been created for fish farming, for urban planning reasons or as a result of open cast mining.

== Rivers, mill and raft ditches ==
The rivers Pleiße, Parthe and White Elster, which have a confluence in the Leipzig area, shaped the development of the city from early on. In the course of Leipzig's city history, the riverbeds have been shifted and, for the most part, canalised.

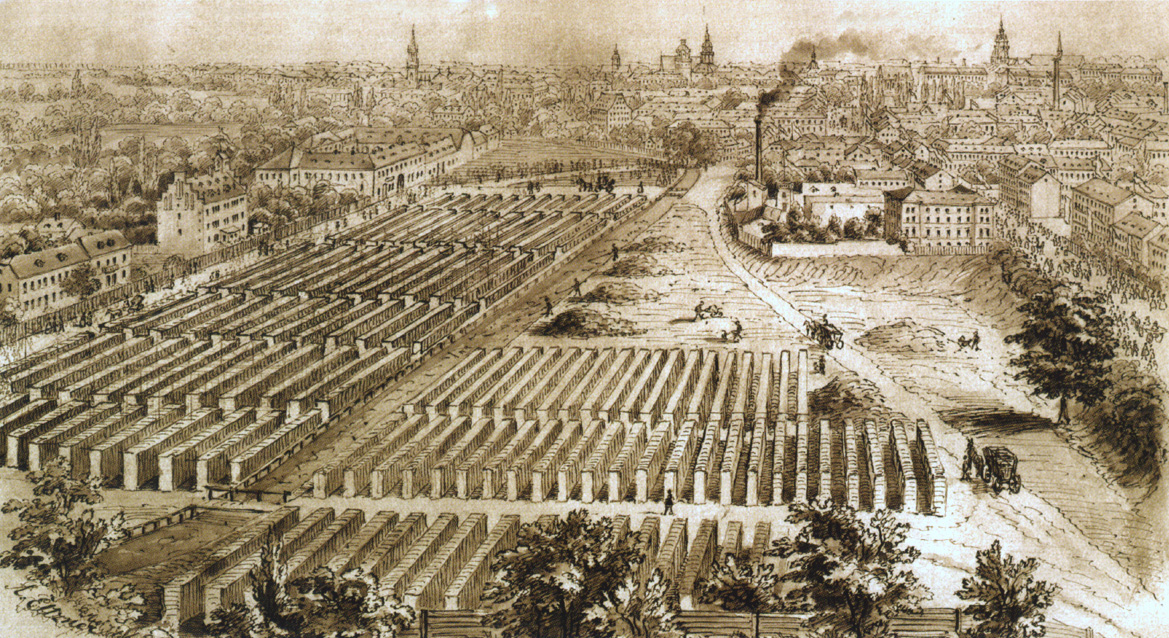
Piles of wood on the Leipzig Flossplatz (1864)

The rivers were used to transport timber as early as the Middle Ages. From the 15th century, canals were built through which firewood and logs were floated into the city to supply the city. The most important canal for Leipzig was the Elsterflossgraben (Elster timber rafting ditch), through which most of the firewood required in the city was transported to a place named Flossplatz.

The water to drive the Leipzig mills was routed via mill races, via the Pleißemühlgraben (Pleiße mill race) to the mills called Nonnenmühle, Thomasmühle and Barfussmühle and via the Elstermühlgraben (Elster mill race) to the Angermühle.

From the late 18th century, river bathing also became popular, so that at the peak in the 19th century there were more than 25 river bathing facilities in Leipzig and in the suburbs that were incorporated into it, before pollution finally ended them as a result of increasing industrialization in the first third of the 20th century.

== Pleiße ==
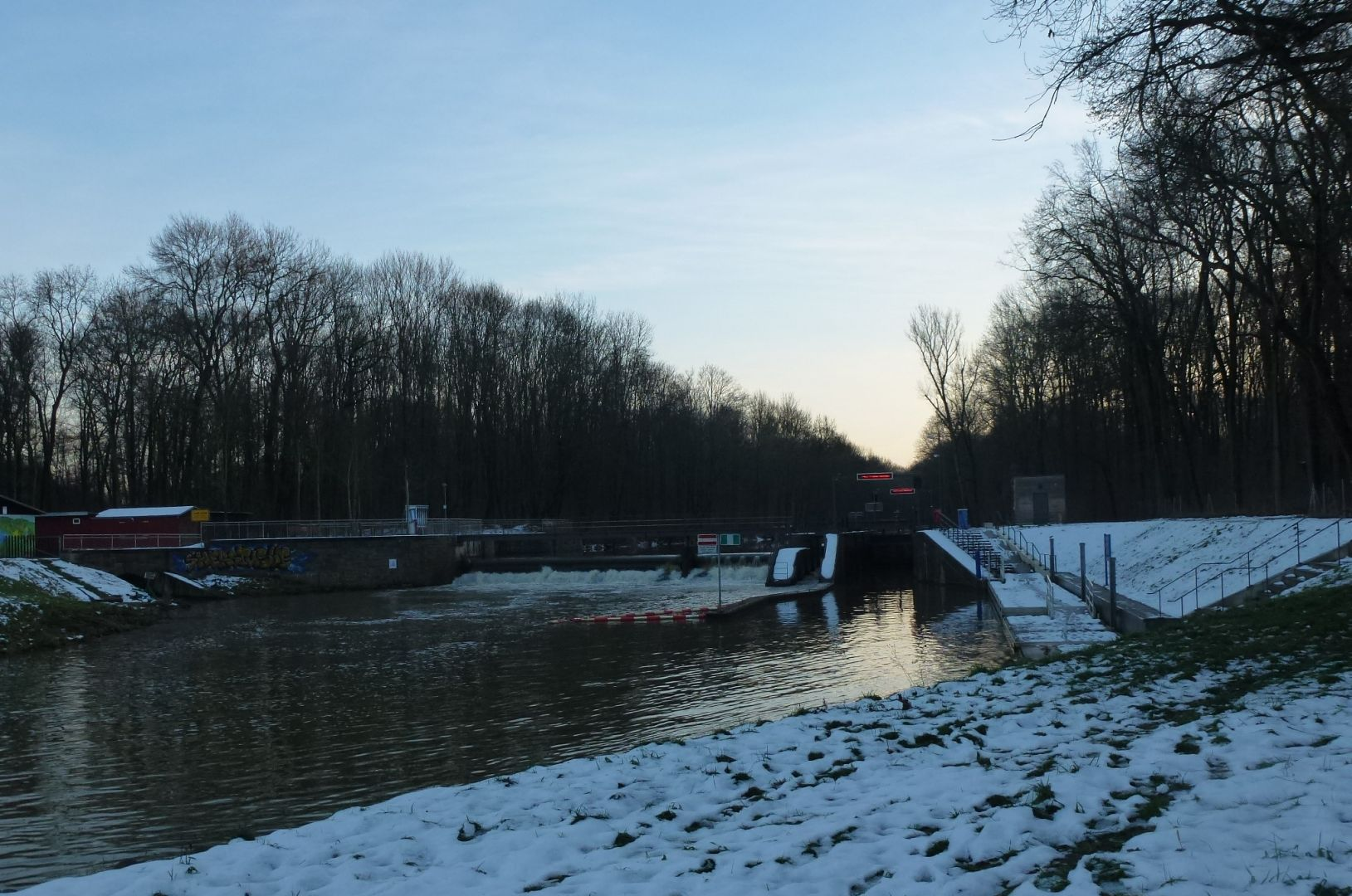
Today's Connewitz Pleiße weir with sluice

The Pleiße river originally divided into two natural branches around the area of today's Connewitz Pleiße weir in the riverside forest: The Rödel flowed from there along the locality of Schleußig and around today's boathouse of the canoe department of the sport club SC DHfK Leipzig into the Elster river. From around 1880, the Rödel branched off from the newly built Elsterflutbett (Elster flood channel), cutting off the inflow from the Pleiße. After that, it only carried a little water and was filled up in 1926/27.

The eastern branch, later called Alte Pleiße (Old Pleiße) and then Kuhstrangwasser, flowed from the Connewitz weir through the Elster flood channel to its confluence with the Elster which was formerly located adjacent today's Bachviertel, near today's swimming bath Schreberbad. This branch was filled in 1879.

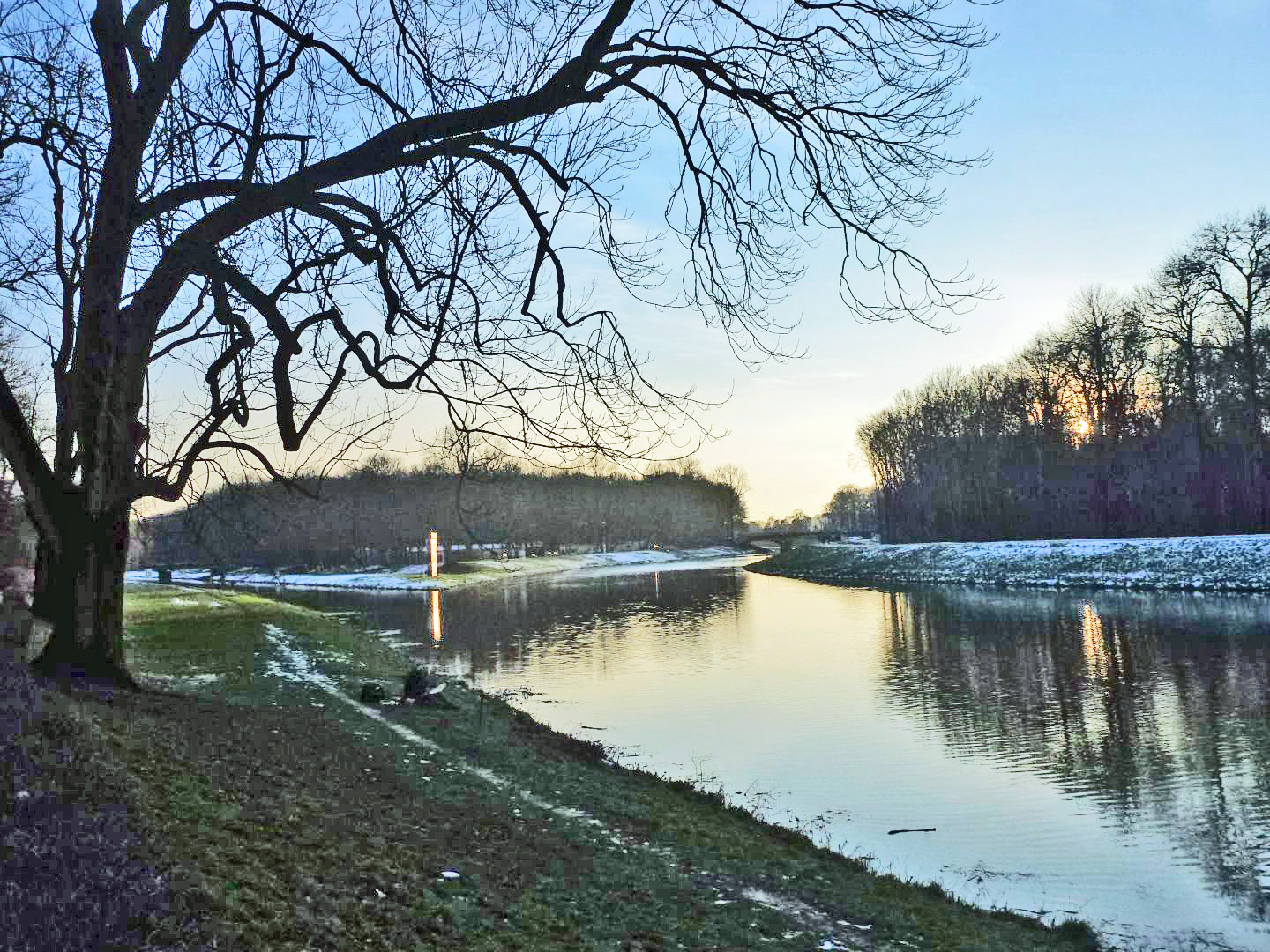
Mouth of the Pleiße flood channel (left) into the Elster flood channel

In 1287 the Nonnenmühlgraben (Nuns Mill Race) was created from the area of today's Connewitz weir to the water mill called Nonnenmühle located in the south of the Pleissenburg (today: New Town Hall). Nowadays, it is connected again with the mill races Thomasmühlgraben and Barfussmühlgraben. They all together form the water body called Mühlpleiße (a combination of the German word for "mill" and Pleiße). In history, the Mühlpleiße absorbed the main part of the Pleiße water and was therefore generally referred to as the Pleiße together with the Gohlis mill race (Gohliser Mühlgraben) and the old stream bed of the Northern Rietzschke until the 20th century. Due to its location directly west of the former moat and the course of the Parthe River from the northern city limits further north to its current stream bed, it has become common to regard Leipzig as a city on the Pleiße.

Until the middle of the 19th century, the Elster-Pleiße floodplain was regularly inundated by floods. According to a project by the Leipzig hydraulic engineers Kohl and Georgi from the years 1852 to 1854, the flooding of the Elster and the Pleiße was subsequently changed. For the Pleiße, the Pleiße flood channel was created from the Connewitz weir to the Elster in the area of today's Palmengarten weir, into which the Elster flood channel was later integrated at the Leipziger Eck and has been called that from there ever since.

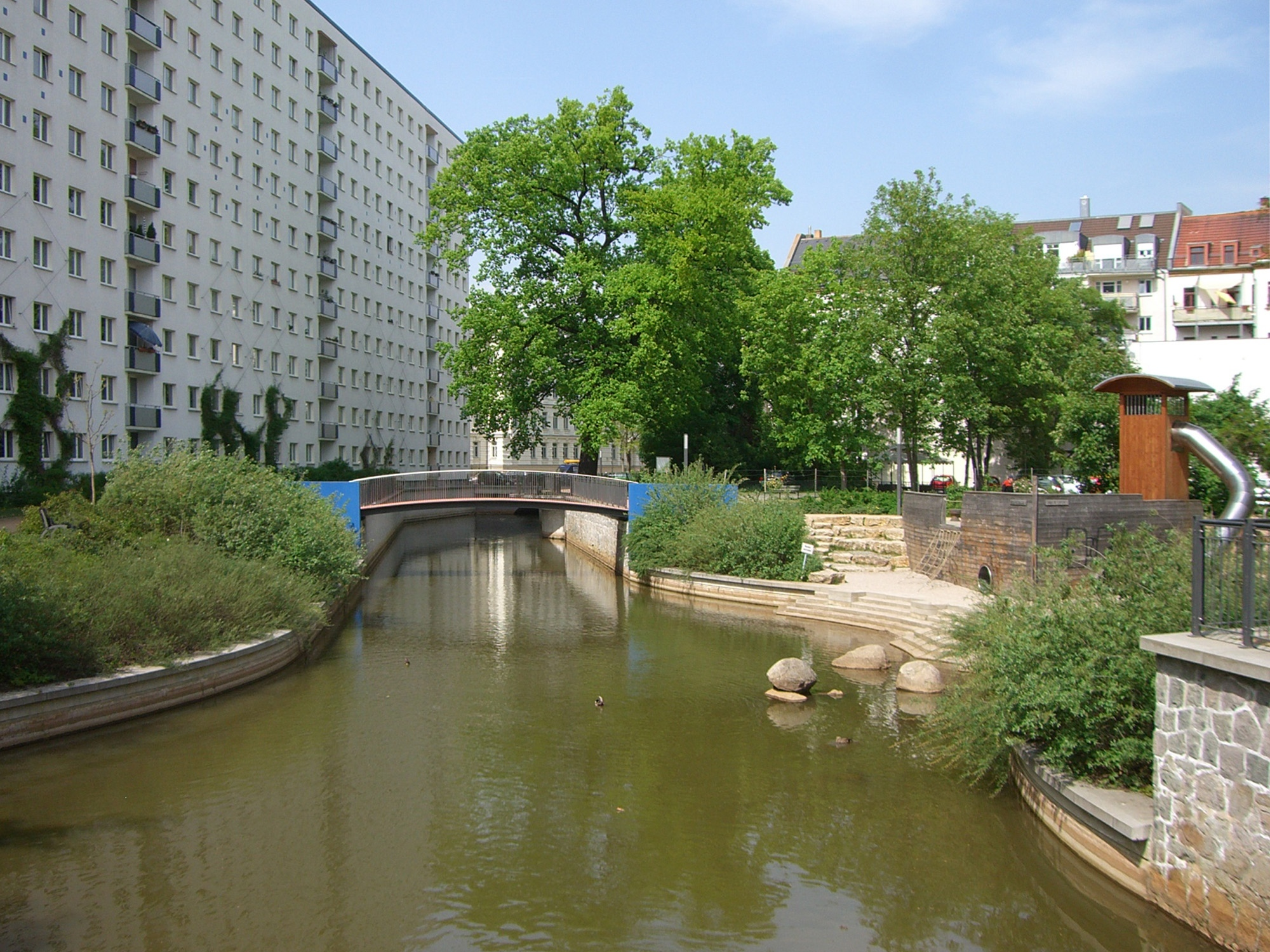
The re-established Pleißemühlgraben at the Spieß bridge

In addition, there were two Pleiße high flood runways in the Leipzig area: the one that still existed north-east of the wildlife park and another from today's Primavesistraße in the neighbourhood of Gohlis to the White Elster south of today's Pohlestraße.

From about 1915, the Pleiße was heavily polluted by the introduction of untreated industrial waste water, so that between 1951 and 1956 the Pleißemühlgraben in the inner city area was arched up to the Goerdelerring and from there to the confluence of the Parthe in the Leipzig Zoo was filled in. Since then, the water from the Pleißemühlgraben has flowed via a short transverse channel at the former location of the Angermühle into the Elstermühlgraben in the neighbourhood of the Waldstraßenviertel, which from there is the former natural stream bed of the Parthe.

After protests by the citizens' movement in 1989 about the pollution of the Pleiße and the economic collapse of many industrial enterprises in the drainage radius of the Pleiße river, the inner-city mill races have been gradually excavated and reopened since 1992.

Step by step, large parts of Leipzig become navigable by light boats.

All of Leipzig's watercourses are (as of 2018) in poor condition according to the European Water Framework Directive.

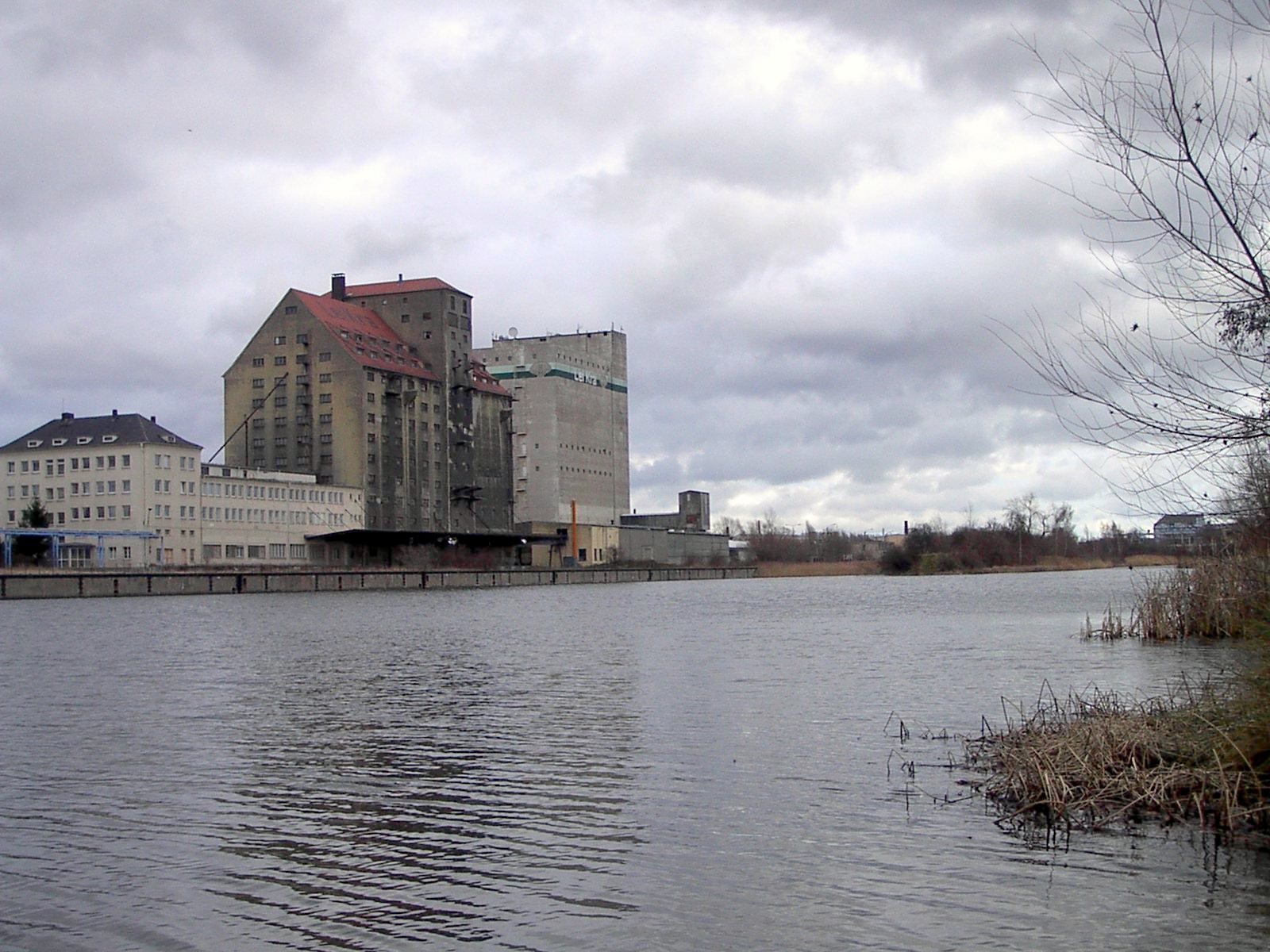
Lindenau Harbor

== Shipping Canals and Harbor ==
Plans to build a canal from Leipzig to the Mulde or Elbe date back to the 17th century. Around 1850, Karl Heine again took up the idea of creating an artificial waterway with a connection to the Elbe. From 1856 to 1896, the Karl Heine Canal was built first, followed by the Elster-Saale Canal from 1933 to 1943, which ends at Günthersdorf, 7.8 km (5 mi) from the Saale. Both canals are to be connected via the Lindenau harbor. The breakthrough of the Karl Heine Canal was completed in July 2015. On 5 June 2026, the newly built Leipzig City Harbour was opened.

== Lakes ==
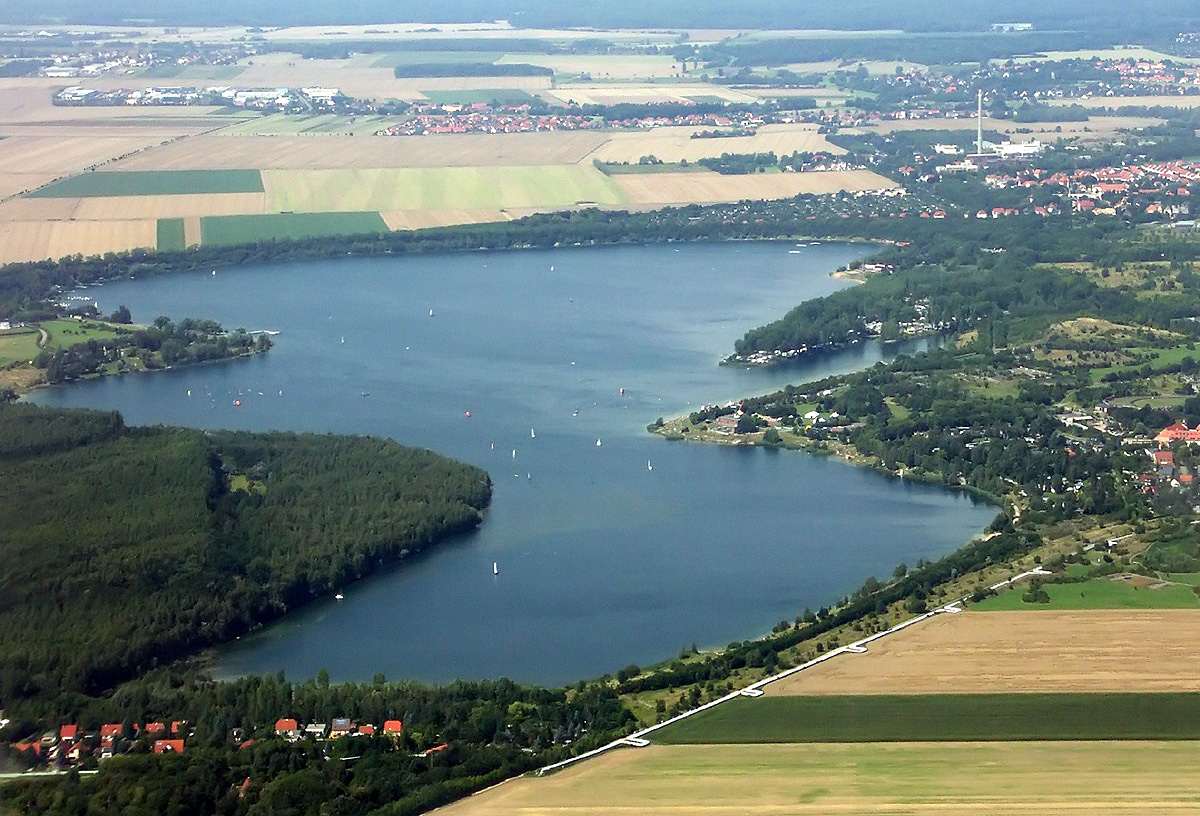
Lake Kulkwitz

The best-known and oldest lakes in the Leipzig urban area are the Kulkwitzer See on the south-western edge of Leipzig (neighbourhoods of Miltitz, Grünau, Lausen) on the border to Markranstädt and the Auensee in the neighbourhood of Leipzig-Wahren, which with the Luna Park from 1914 to 1932 was Germany's largest amusement establishment. Other lakes are located with the Cospudener See also in the southwest of Leipzig on the border to Markkleeberg in the south in the district of Leipzig and in the north in the district of Nordsachsen (North Saxony). They were largely created through the recultivation of former opencast mining areas. Together they form the Leipzig Neuseenland.

== See also ==
- Neuseenland
- Waterknot of Leipzig

== Bibliography ==
- Grebenstein, Georg (1995). "Die Leipziger Gewässer von der Jahrtausendwende bis zur Gegenwart". Neue Ufer (in German) (3). Leipzig: Passage-Verlag.
- Leo Artmann, Axel Bobbe (2005). "Hochwasserschutz in Leipzig". Der Leipzig Atlas [Flood Protection in Leipzig] (in German). Herrmann-Josef Emons Verlag. pp. 32–33. ISBN 3-89705-269-5.
- Niels Gormsen (2005). "Gewässer ans Licht - Öffnung und Renaturierung der Mühlgräben in der Stadt". Der Leipzig Atlas [Uncover the Bodies of Water - Opening and Renaturation of the Mill Races in the City] (in German). Herrmann-Josef Emons Verlag. pp. 40–41. ISBN 3-89705-269-5.
- Diana Pöschel, Helga Schmidt (2005). "Canale Nostalghia - Karl-Heine-Kanal". Der Leipzig Atlas (in German). Herrmann-Josef Emons Verlag. pp. 136–137. ISBN 3-89705-269-5.
- Andreas Bergner (2005). "Leipzig im Zentrum der "Neuen Wasserlandschaft Mitteldeutschlands"". Der Leipzig Atlas [Leipzig in the Middle of the "New Water Landscape of Central Germany] (in German). Herrmann-Josef Emons Verlag. pp. 142–143. ISBN 3-89705-269-5.
- Mitteldeutsche Seenlandschaft (in German) (Leipziger Blätter ed.). Leipzig: Passage Verlag. 2007-06-27. ISBN 978-3-938543-35-1.
- Stadt am Wasser (in German) (Leipziger Blätter ed.). Leipzig: Passage Verlag. 2010-05-15. ISBN 978-3-938543-80-1.
- Ringel, Sebastian (2015). Leipzig! One Thousand Years of History. Leipzig: Edition Leipzig in the Seemann Henschel GmbH & Co. KG. ISBN 978-3-361-00710-9.
