= Auensee =

Auensee (Meadow lake) is the name of the following bodies of water:

- Auensee (Kissing), in Bavaria
- Auensee (Leipzig), Leipzig

== See also ==
- Haus Auensee
