= Leipziger Parkeisenbahn =

Miniature railway in Leipzig, Germany

Coordinates: 51.370762°N 12.31915°E

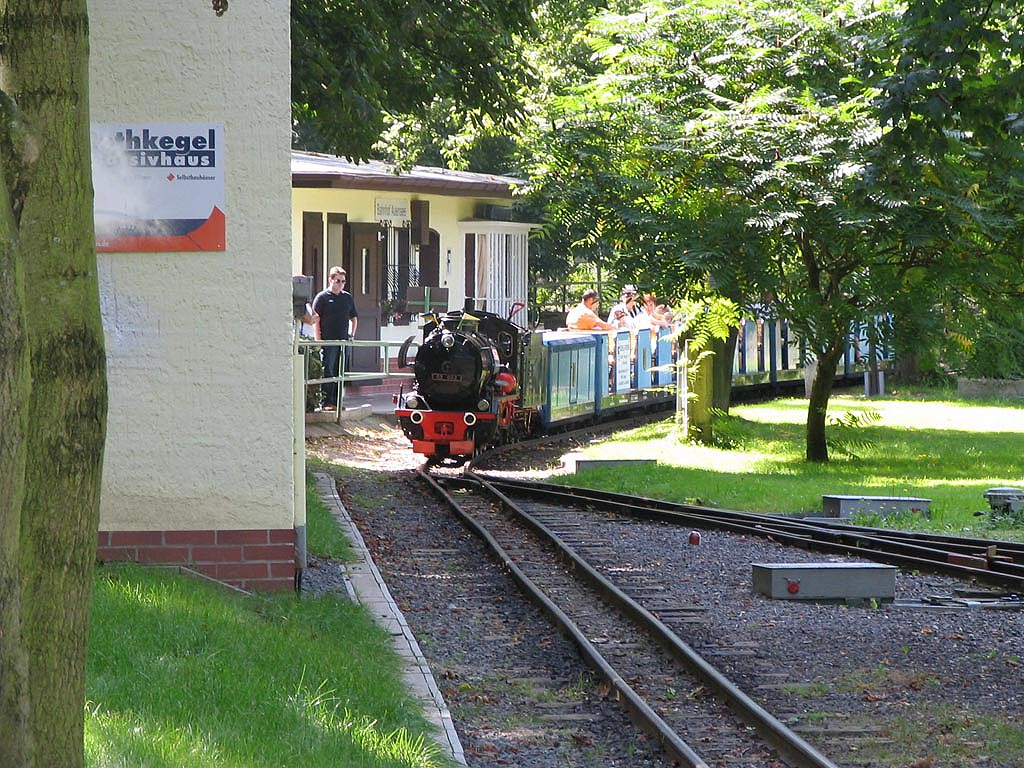
The Leipziger Parkeisenbahn

The Leipziger Parkeisenbahn (Leipzig park railway) is a 15 in (381 mm) minimum-gauge railway in Leipzig, Germany. The line is also known as the Parkeisenbahn Auensee.

The Railway was first opened in 1951 as "Pioniereisenbahn", one of the children's railways in the former Eastern Bloc Countries.

The line of 1.9 kilometres (1.2 mi) goes around a lake called Auensee (formed in 1909, from a gravel pit, the material used to build Leipzig Central Station).

== See also ==
- Fifteen-inch–gauge railway

== History ==
The line opened on 5 August 1951, the second children's railway in the DDR. The railway survived the end of the DDR, and continues its original intention, the education and instruction of children.
