= Kulkwitzer See =

Lake in Saxony, Germany

- Location within Saxony
- Location: Saxony
- Coordinates: 51°18′30.95″N 12°14′50.1″E
- Basin countries: Germany
- Surface area: 1.7 km^{2} (0.66 sq mi)
- Max. depth: 36 m (118 ft)
- Water volume: 26,800,000 m^{3} (950,000,000 cu ft)
- Shore length^{1}: 8 km (5.0 mi)
- Surface elevation: 114.5 m (376 ft)
- Settlements: Leipzig (Grünau), Markranstädt
- ^{1} Shore length is not a well-defined measure.

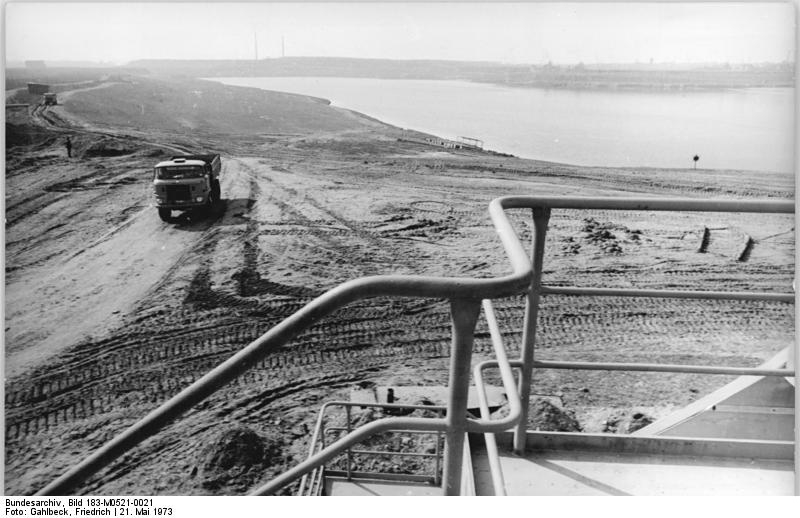
Earth moving at the Kulkwitzer See, May 1973

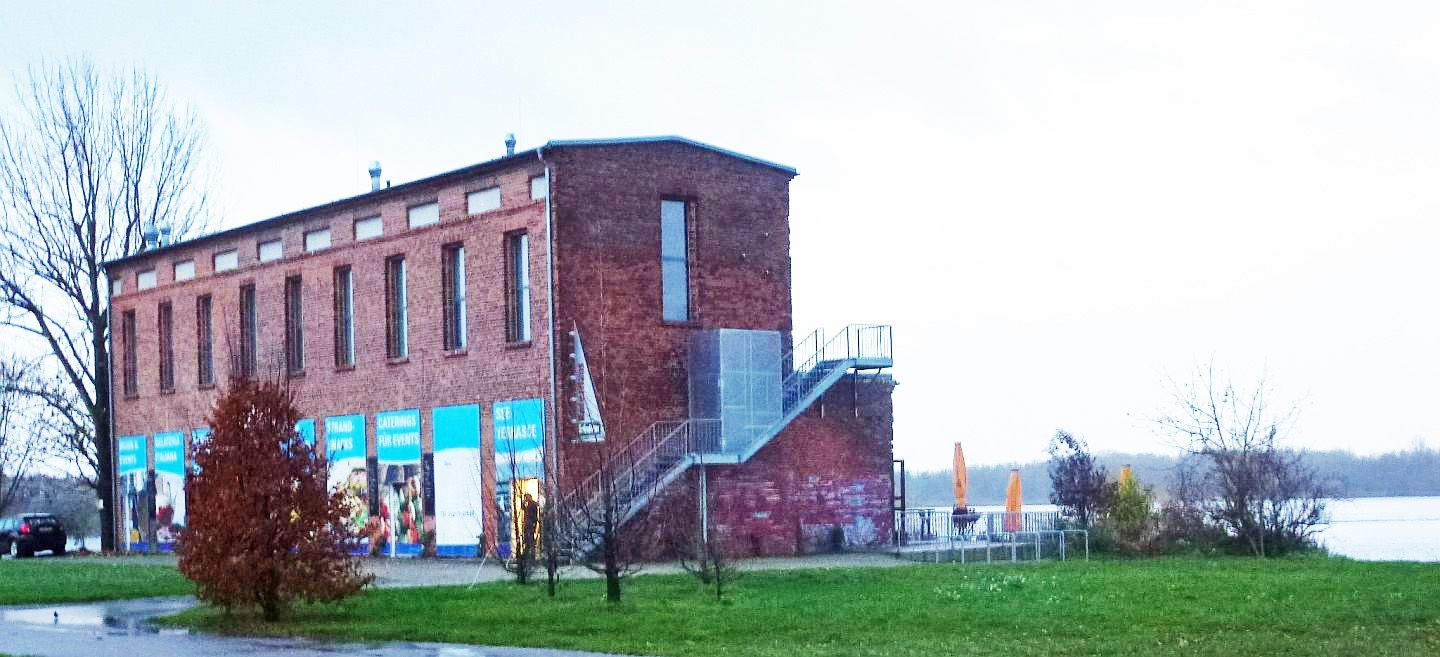
So-called Red House

The Kulkwitzer See (Lake Kulkwitz), colloquially called Kulki, is a lake in the western part of Saxony, Germany. The lake is a part of the Central German Lake District.

Kulkwitzer See emerged from two former lignite opencast mining areas southwest of Leipzig. Coal was mined here from 1864, first underground and from 1937 in opencast mining. The two remaining opencast mines were flooded from 1963 and opened in 1973 as a local recreation area.

== Location ==
The lake is located east of Markranstädt, north of the former village of Göhrenz, 1999 incorporated as a neighborhood into Markranstädt, south of the former village of Miltitz, 1999 incorporated as a neighborhood into Leipzig, and west of Grünau and Lausen, both parts of Leipzig. It is named after the former village of Kulkwitz, which became a neighborhood of Markranstädt in 1999.

== Tourist facilities ==
There are substantial tourist facilities: several bathing beaches - on the western shore also one suitable for the disabled, a circular hiking trail, a ship restaurant, the restaurant Rotes Haus (in English: Red House, formerly the control center of the opencast mine) and other restaurants and snack bars, a camping site, a sauna, a high ropes course, a sledding hill, diving, sailing, boating and surfing opportunities. In 2018, the cycle path around the lake was handed over.

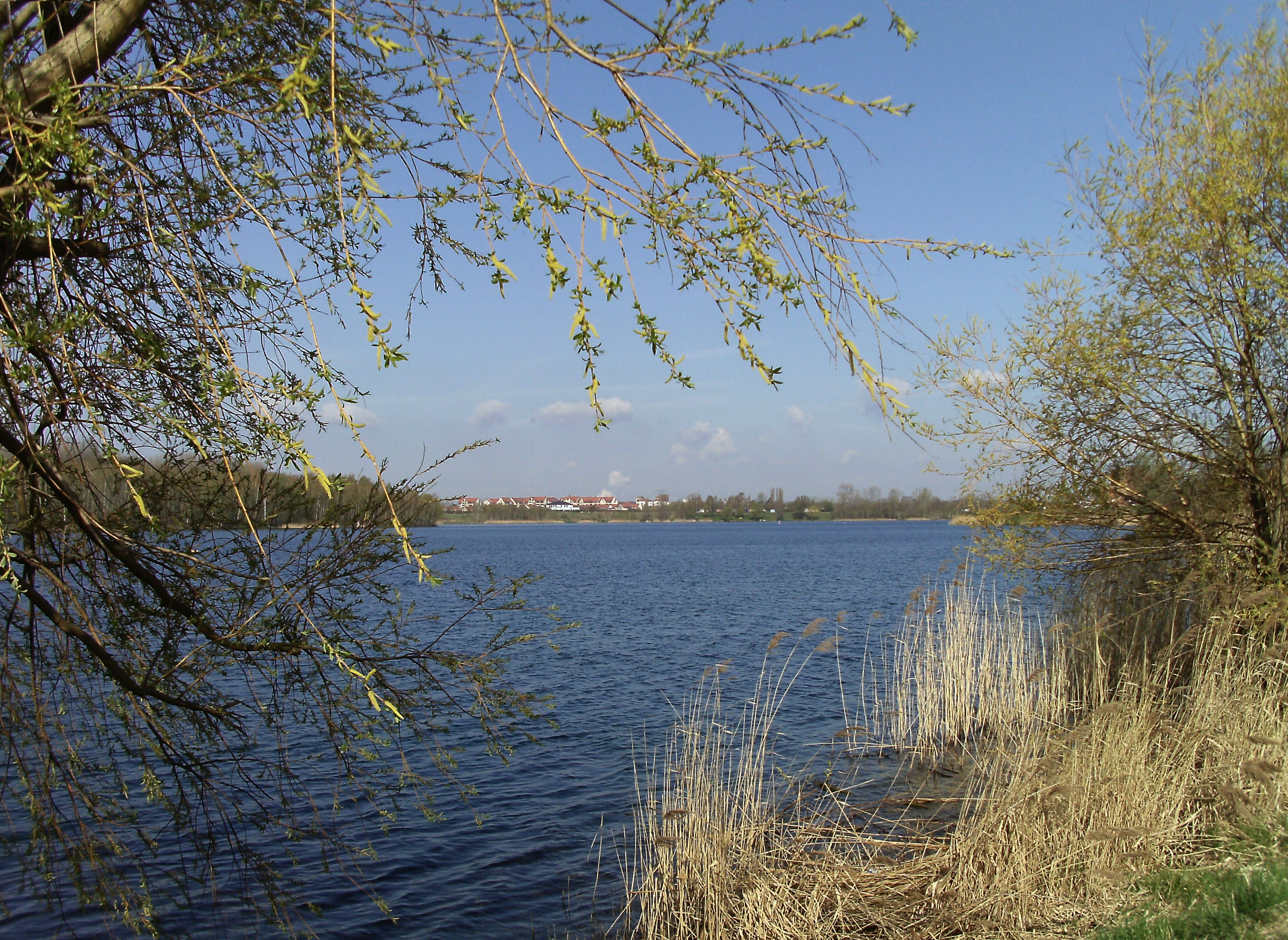
View from Lausen towards Markranstädt

Together with bathers, anglers and surfers, around 500,000 visitors visit Lake Kulkwitz every year.

== Operation ==
From 1993 until 2021, the lake has been operated in the responsibility of the "Zweckverband Kulkwitzer See" association. At last, two cities belonged to this association – Leipzig and Markranstädt. The chairman was the respective mayor of Markranstädt. In 2003, the association outsourced the operation of the lake to an external private business agency - LeipzigSeen GmbH based in Leipzig.

== Underwater diving and sports events ==
Marathon and triathlon events, lake festivals and other sporting events have also been held here since the 1970s.

Due to its underwater flora and fauna and its good depth of visibility, the lake is applied one of the ten best diving waters in Germany and attracts around 35,000 overnight stays from tourists, mainly divers from all over Germany and Europe. There are several underwater hotspots especially for divers. A small chapel, an airplane wreck and a set up scaffolding that were formerly sunk by the Bundeswehr for training purposes. The Kulkwitzer See is home to various types of fish such as perch, pike, catfish, carp, roach, eel, ruff and tench.

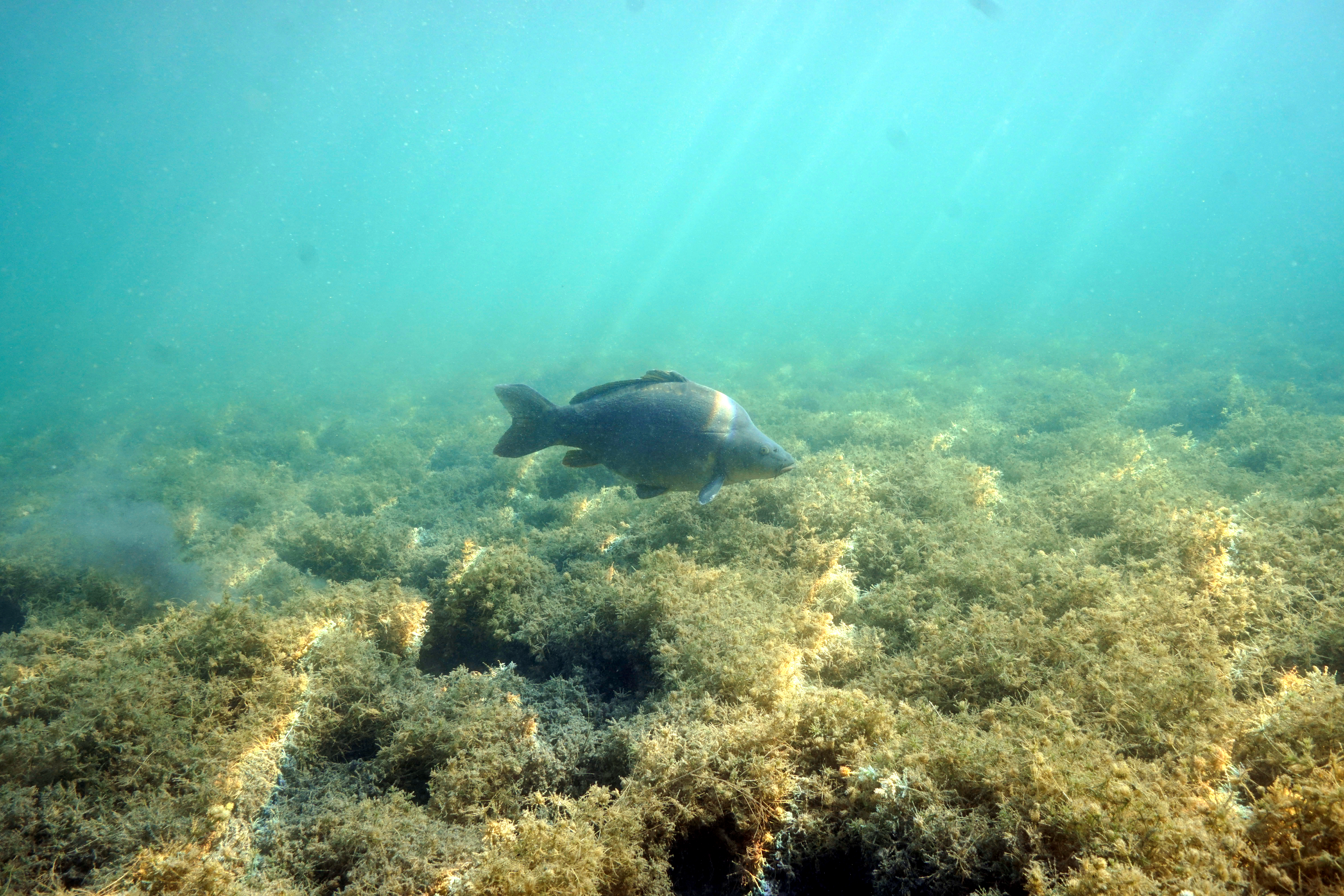
Carp over a bed of Characeen

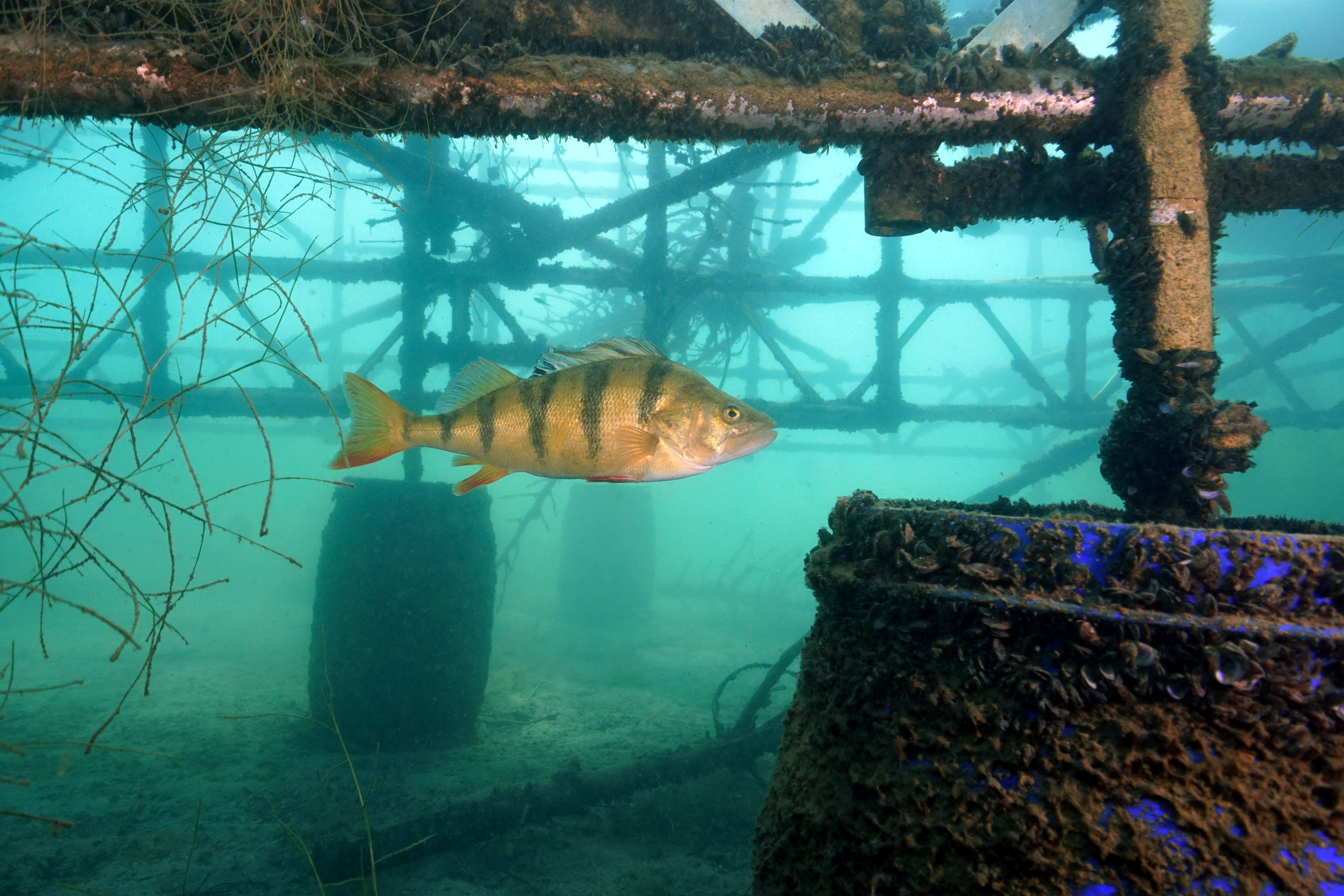
Perch on sunken scaffolding

== Traffic ==
The Kulkwitzer See is easily accessible by public transport:

- Terminus "Lausen" of the tram
- Terminus of the S-Bahn "Miltitzer Allee"
- as well as bus routes.

Bundesstraße 87 runs on the north side of the lake. Parking spaces, some of which are subject to a fee, are connected to the Bundesstrasse both on the Markranstadt side and on the Leipzig side.

On the route of the former railway line, which touches the Kulkwitzer See in the southeast, the Elster-Saale cycle path was laid out, which connects the Elster cycle path with the Saale cycle path.

== See also ==
- Bodies of water in Leipzig

== Literature ==
- Kulturbund der DDR, Gesellschaft für Heimatgeschichte Leipzig (Hrsg.), Historisches rund um Grünau, Leipzig 1988 (in German)
- Thomas Herles, Lutz Schiffer: Bergbaurestseen in Mitteldeutschland. Seenkompass. Campus Espenhain GmbH und Sächsische Akademie der Wissenschaften zu Leipzig, Chemnitz/Espenhain 2002 (in German)
- Dachverein Mitteldeutsche Straße der Braunkohle e.V. and Pro Leipzig (ed.), Auf der Straße der Braunkohle, Leipzig 2003, ISBN 3-936508-98-4, pp. 125-127 (in German)
- Dieter Florian, Der Kulkwitzer See, ein Tauchparadies im Leipziger Westen, in: Leipziger Blätter, Sonderausgabe Mitteldeutsche Seenlandschaft, Leipzig 2007, ISBN 978-3-938543-35-1, S. 54-56 (in German)
- Horst Riedel: Kulkwitzer See. In: Stadtlexikon Leipzig von A bis Z. PRO LEIPZIG, Leipzig 2012, ISBN 978-3-936508-82-6, p. 326 (in German)
