= Northern Rietzschke =

River in Germany

Coordinates: 51.3684°N 12.3826°E

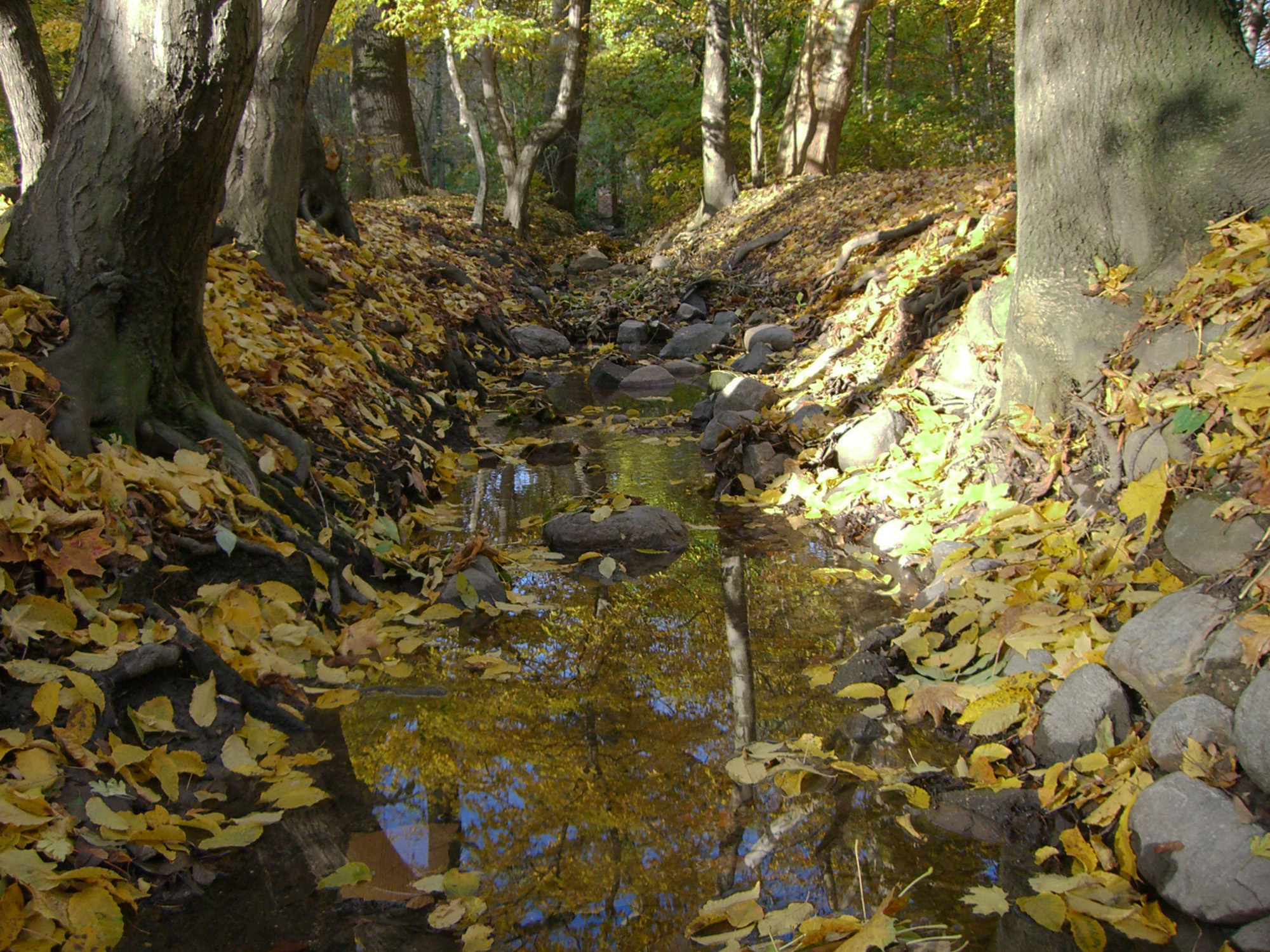
- Native name: Nördliche Rietzschke (German)

Location
- Country: Germany
- States: Saxony

The Northern Rietzschke (German: Nördliche Rietzschke) is a river of Saxony, Germany.

The Northern Rietzschke River has two source streams: the Seehausener Mühlgraben, which originates in Seehausen, and the Lindenthaler Wasser , which originates west of Lindenthal.

== See also ==
- List of rivers of Saxony
- Bodies of water in Leipzig
