= Haus Auensee =

Coordinates: 51°22′11″N 12°18′56″E

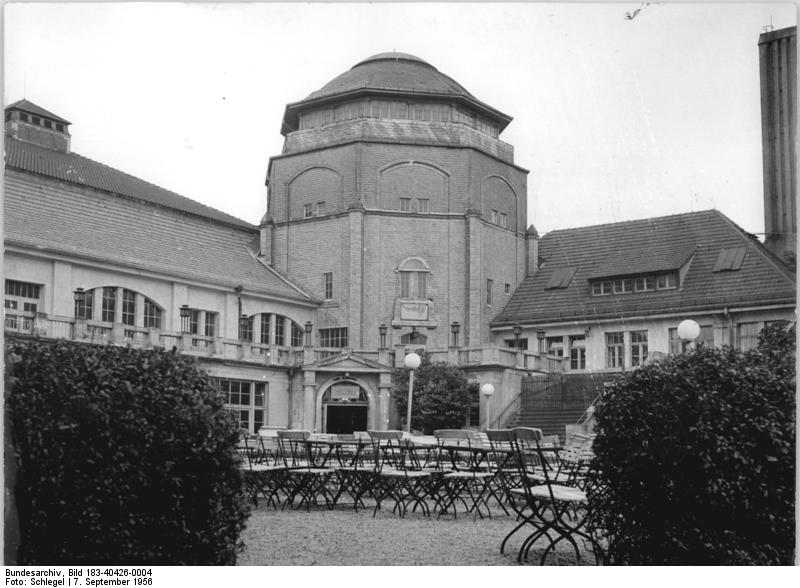
Haus Auensee in 1956.

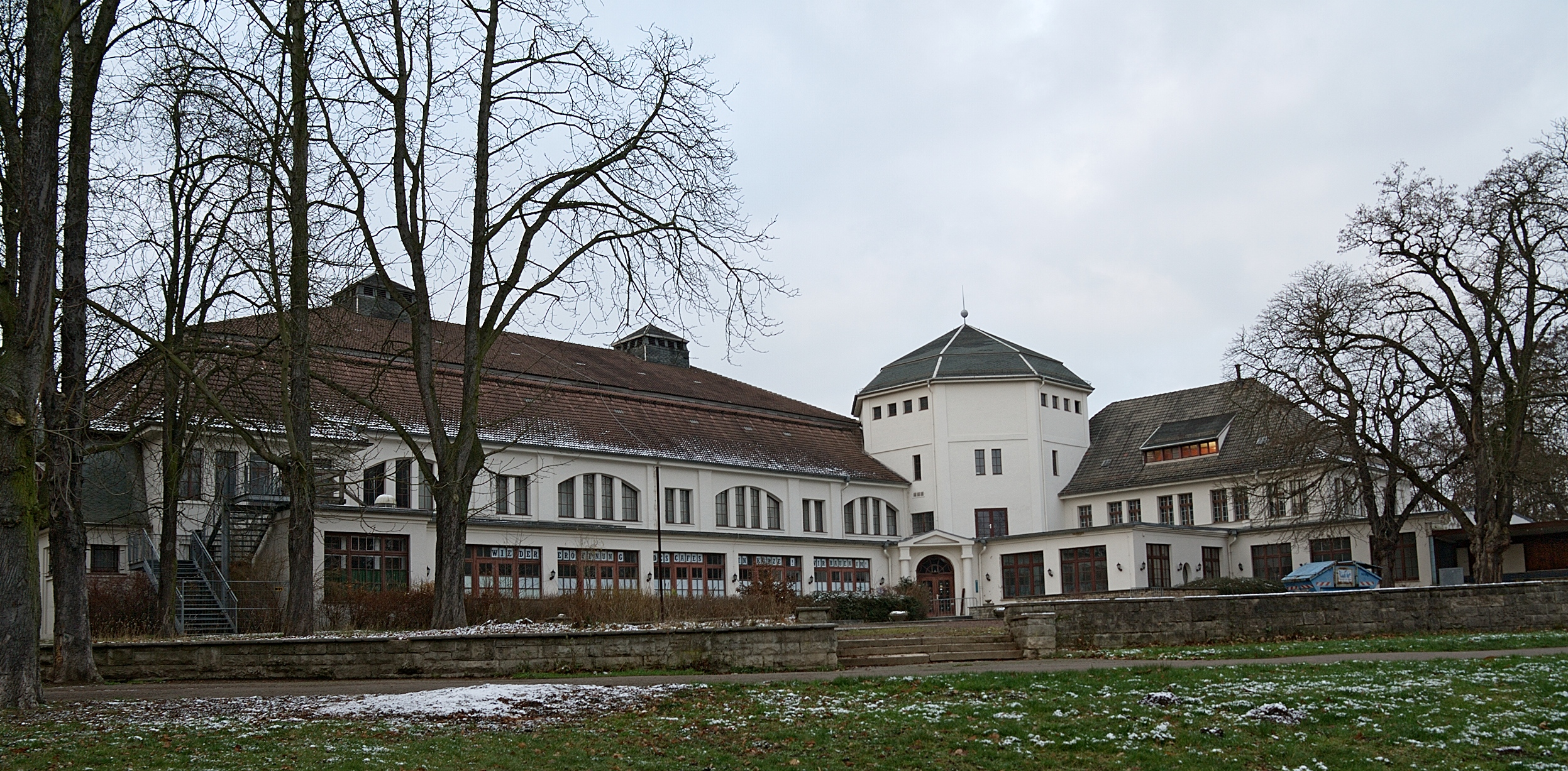
Haus Auensee today

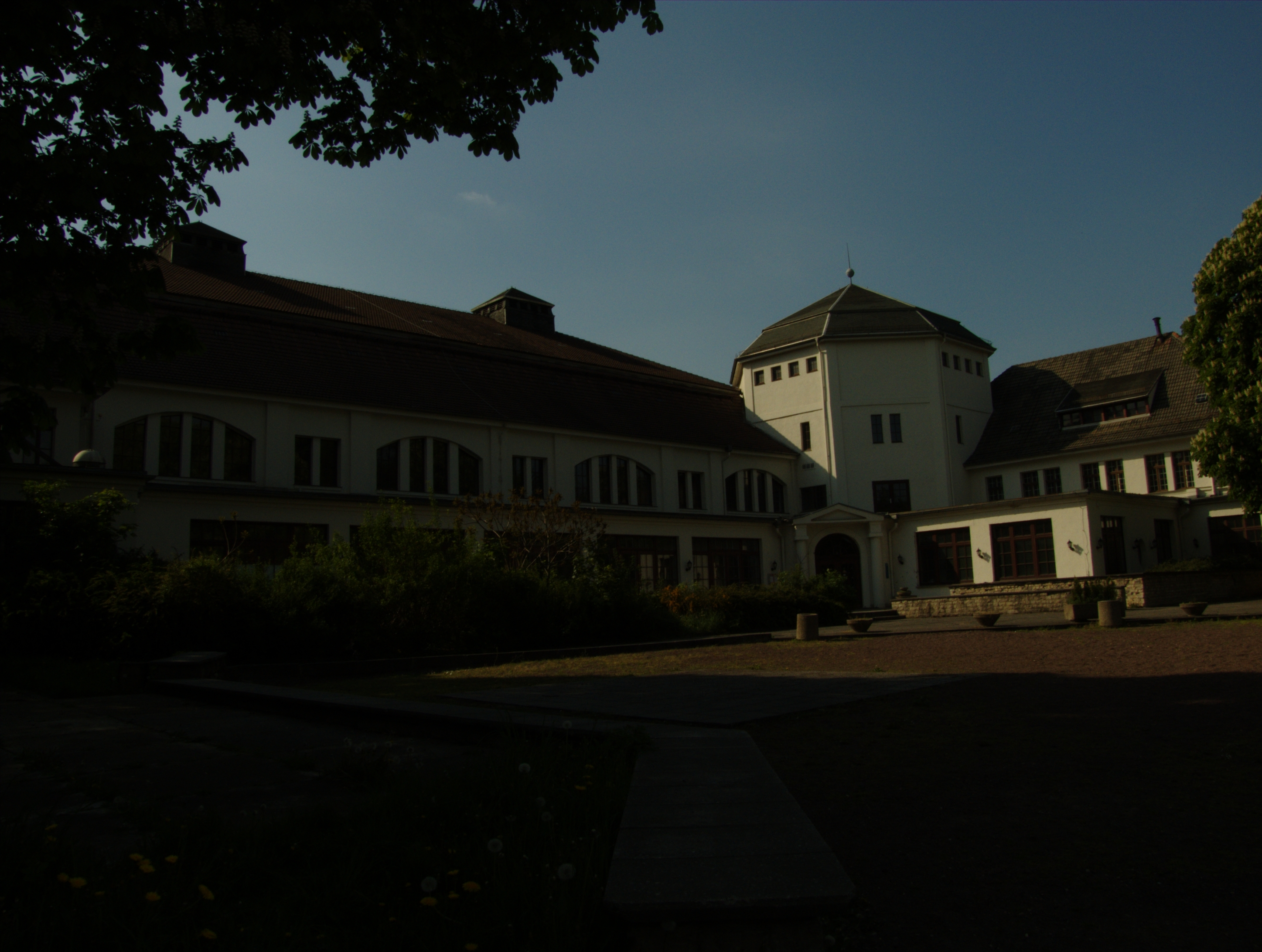
Haus Auensee today

Haus Auensee is a concert hall located in Leipzig, Saxony, Germany. Leipzig Auensee is a frequently used concert venue for national and international artists in Leipzig. The capacity is about 3,600 people. The house is named after the nearby lake Auensee which in turn is named after Leipzig Riverside Forest.

== History ==
Construction began in 1911. The house was originally meant as the main restaurant of the Luna Park. On 5 May 1914 the new house was completed. With the bankruptcy and the foreclosure of the Luna Park on 13 January 1932 only the restaurant remained. In 1936, the house became known as Haus Auensee.

In 1949, Auensee House reopened as a restaurant again, after wartime closure.

From 1981 to 1985 the house was renovated. The reopening took place on 5 October 1985.

In the 1990s, the house was known as Easy Auensee. On 13 November 1998, a new nightclub inside the house opened under the name Luna Park. There were financial problems and the property went into receivership. After that the property was used only occasionally for concerts. Under a new operator "MAWI Concert" concerts and events began again from 2010.
