= Markranstädt =

Town in Saxony, Germany

- Town
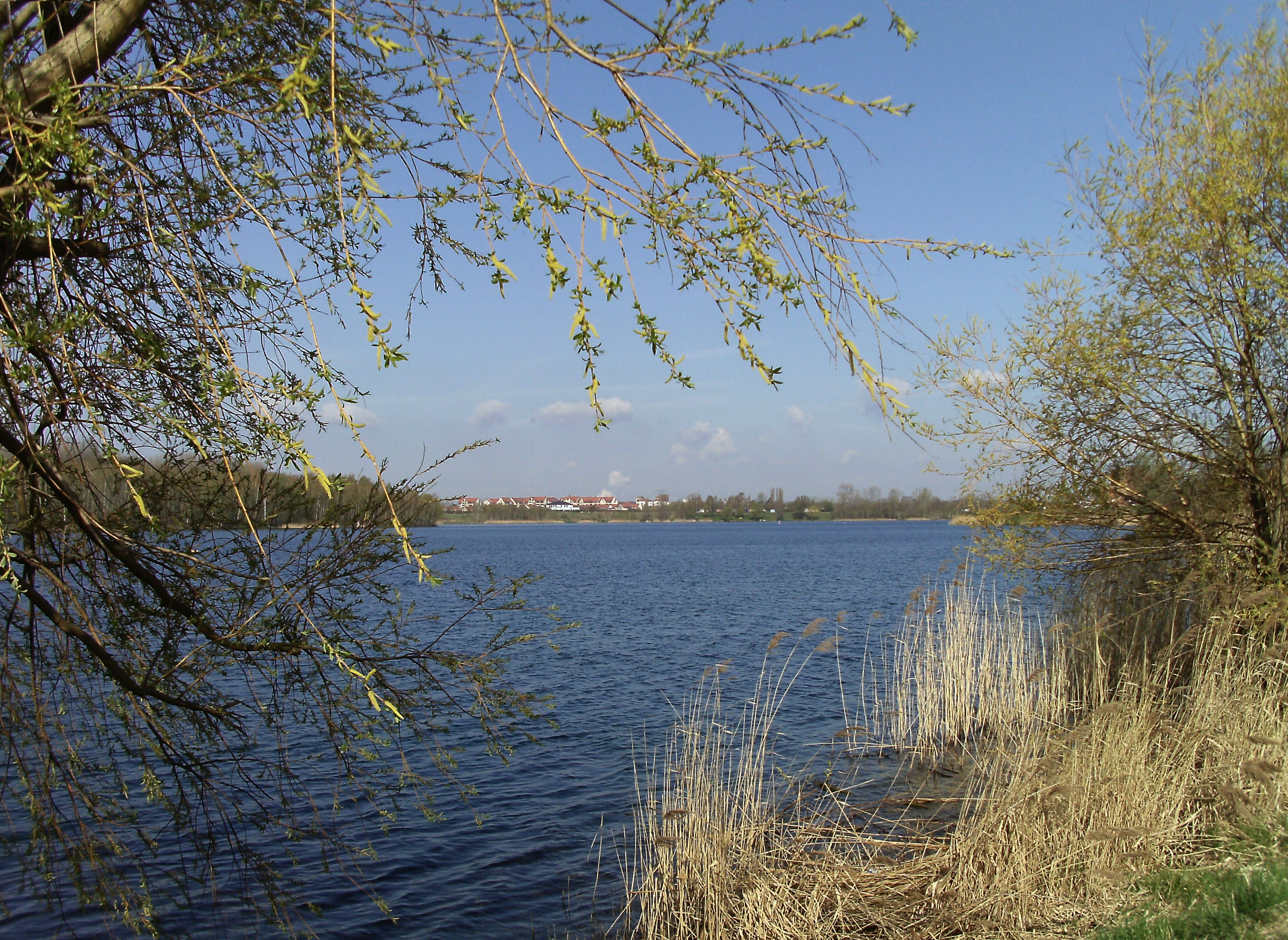
- Kulkwitzer See with Markranstädt in the background

- Coat of arms

- Location of Markranstädt within Leipzig district
- Interactive map of Markranstädt
- Location within Germany Location within Saxony
- Coordinates: 51°18′6″N 12°13′16″E
- Country: Germany
- State: Saxony
- District: Leipzig
- Subdivisions: 9

Government
  - Mayor (2020–27): Nadine Stitterich

Area
  - Total: 58.46 km^{2} (22.57 sq mi)
- Elevation: 119 m (390 ft)

Population (2025-12-31)
  - Total: 16,069
  - Density: 274.9/km^{2} (711.9/sq mi)
- Time zone: UTC+01:00 (CET)
  - Summer (DST): UTC+02:00 (CEST)
- Postal codes: 04420
- Dialling codes: 034205
- Vehicle registration: L, BNA, GHA, GRM, MTL, WUR
- Website: www.markranstaedt.de

Markranstädt (German: [ˈmaʁkʁanʃtɛt]) is a town in the Leipzig district, in Saxony, Germany. It is situated 11 km southwest of the city of Leipzig and has close to 15,000 inhabitants.

== Geography ==
=== Location ===
Markranstädt is located about 10 km (6.2 mi) south-west of Leipzig city centre, between Saxony-Anhalt and the Leipzig housing estate Grünau, to the west of the Kulkwitzer See. It is the only municipality in the Landkreis Leipzig that lies west of the city.

=== Divisions ===
Markranstädt is a municipality consisting of the town itself and the following six Ortschaften (localities), each containing several Ortsteile or divisions:

- Frankenheim (incl. Lindennaundorf and Priesteblich)
- Großlehna (incl. Altranstädt)
- Göhrenz (incl. Albersdorf)
- Kulkwitz (incl. Gärnitz and Seebenisch)
- Quesitz (incl. Döhlen and Thronitz)
- Räpitz (incl. Meyhen, Schkeitbar and Schkölen)

== History ==
The first documentary mention of Markranstädt was in 1285 as the seat of a court. Probably founded as a subsidiary settlement of the neighbouring monastic settlement Altranstädt, it was mentioned as a marketplace in 1287 and as a small town in 1354.

The name is also derived from its foundation: it was founded as Ranstädt (ran = "place on cleared land"), while meanwhile Ranstädt became known as Altranstädt (literally "Old Ranstadt"). Ranstädt then obtained the right to hold markets, hence the current name "Markranstädt".

In the year 1633, during the Thirty Years War, the town was burned by the Holk'sche Reiter. The fire destroyed, amongst other buildings, the town hall and all its records. The plague epidemic of 1634 and the famine of 1639 led to a drastic population decline. In the year 1650 Markranstädt numbered fewer than 150 inhabitants. The next local disaster happened in 1671, as 31 houses were destroyed by a large fire. At the beginning of the 18th century, the town began to recover again.

In 1706 and 1707, the "Treaties of Altranstädt" were signed.

Markranstädt had its brush with world history on 23 July 1807, when Napoléon Bonaparte, together with his entourage, stayed overnight in the guesthouse Zum Rosenkranz. In the course of the Völkerschlacht in 1813 the town was once again adversely affected.

Markranstädt experienced an economic boom toward the end of the 19th century. It was concentrated in the furrier business, but machine-building flourished also. A car factory and Markranstädter Brewery were established. The town was well known until World War II for Markranstädter Pilsener beer.

== Culture ==
There are frequent musical events in the local church and the town celebrates the "Kinderfest" yearly, which includes big parades and loud music.

== Attractions ==
- Kulkwitz Lake (Kulkwitzer See), with 1.6 square kilometres (400 acres) surface water and 2 square kilometres (500 acres) surrounding area, popular with watersports enthusiasts, holidaymakers and walkers
- St. Laurentius town church, built 1518–1525
- Altranstädt Castle (Schloss Altranstädt)
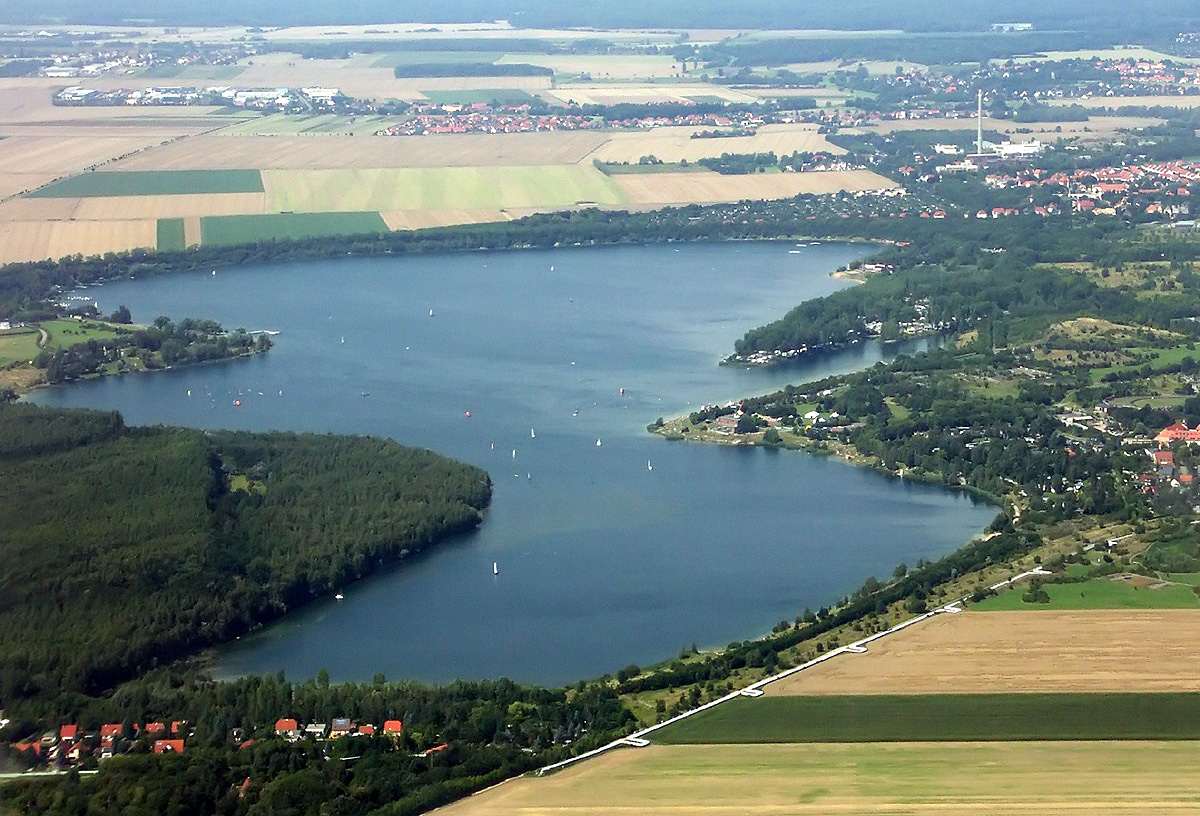
Kulkwitzer See

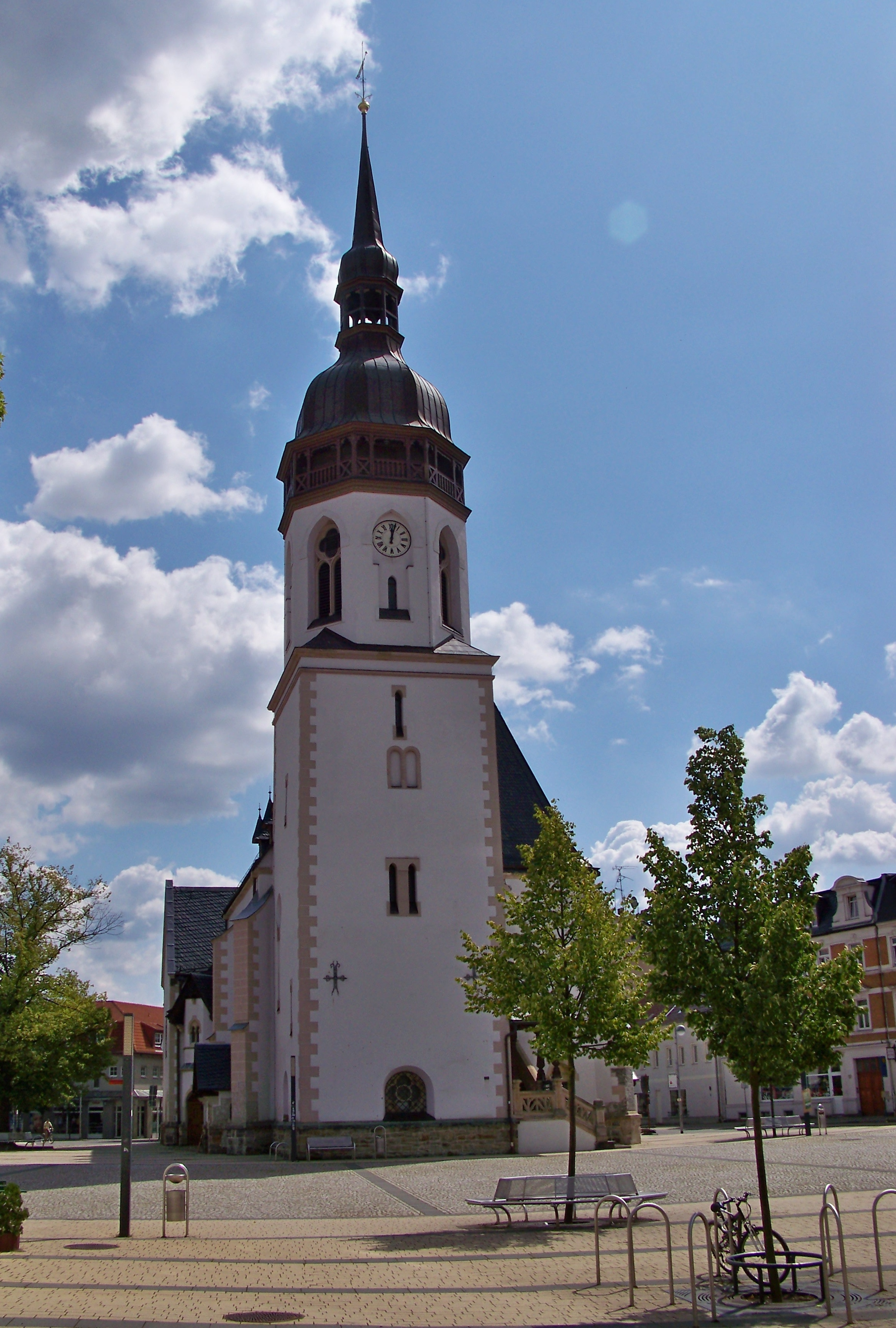
St. Laurentius church

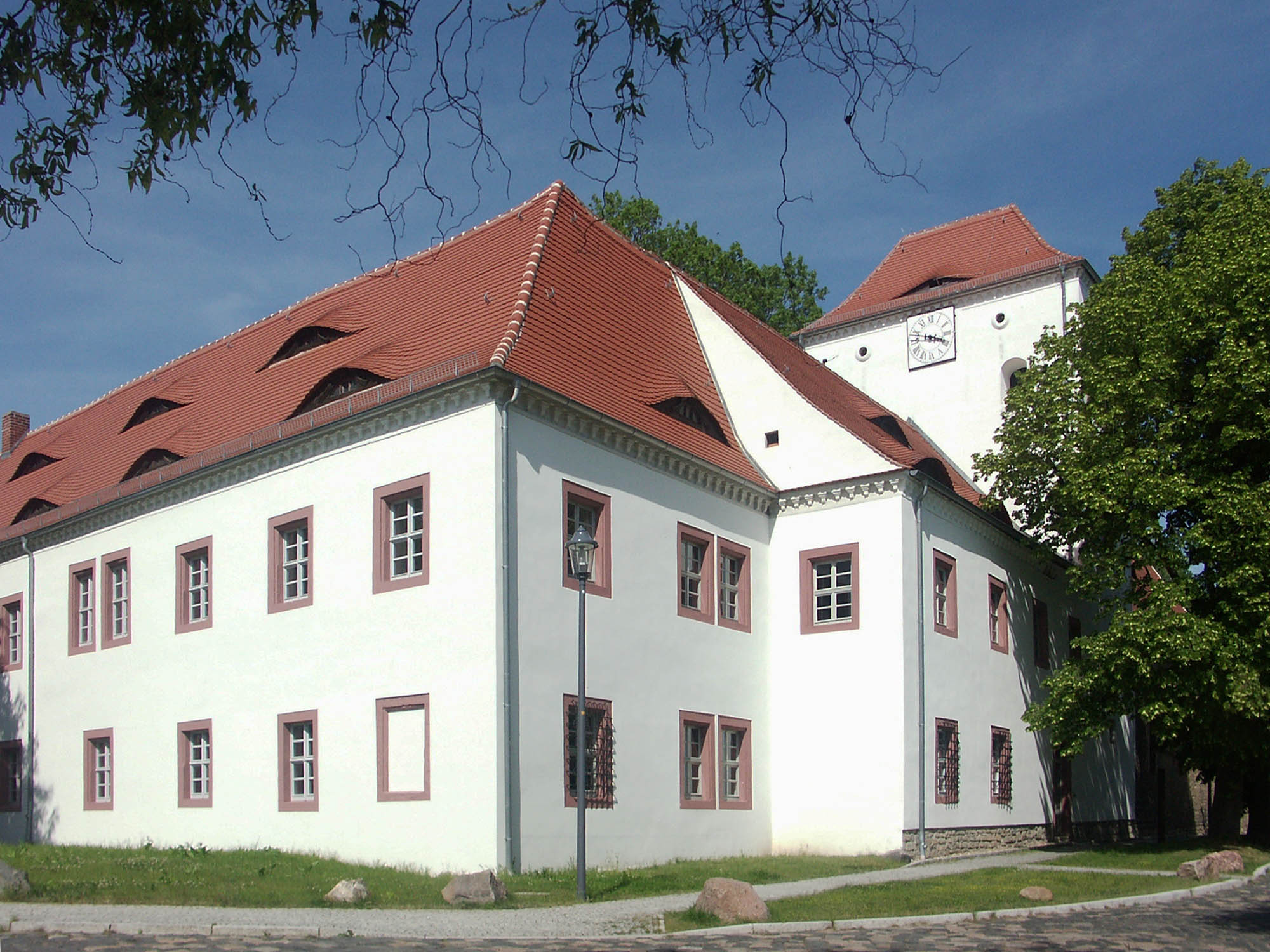
Altranstädt castle

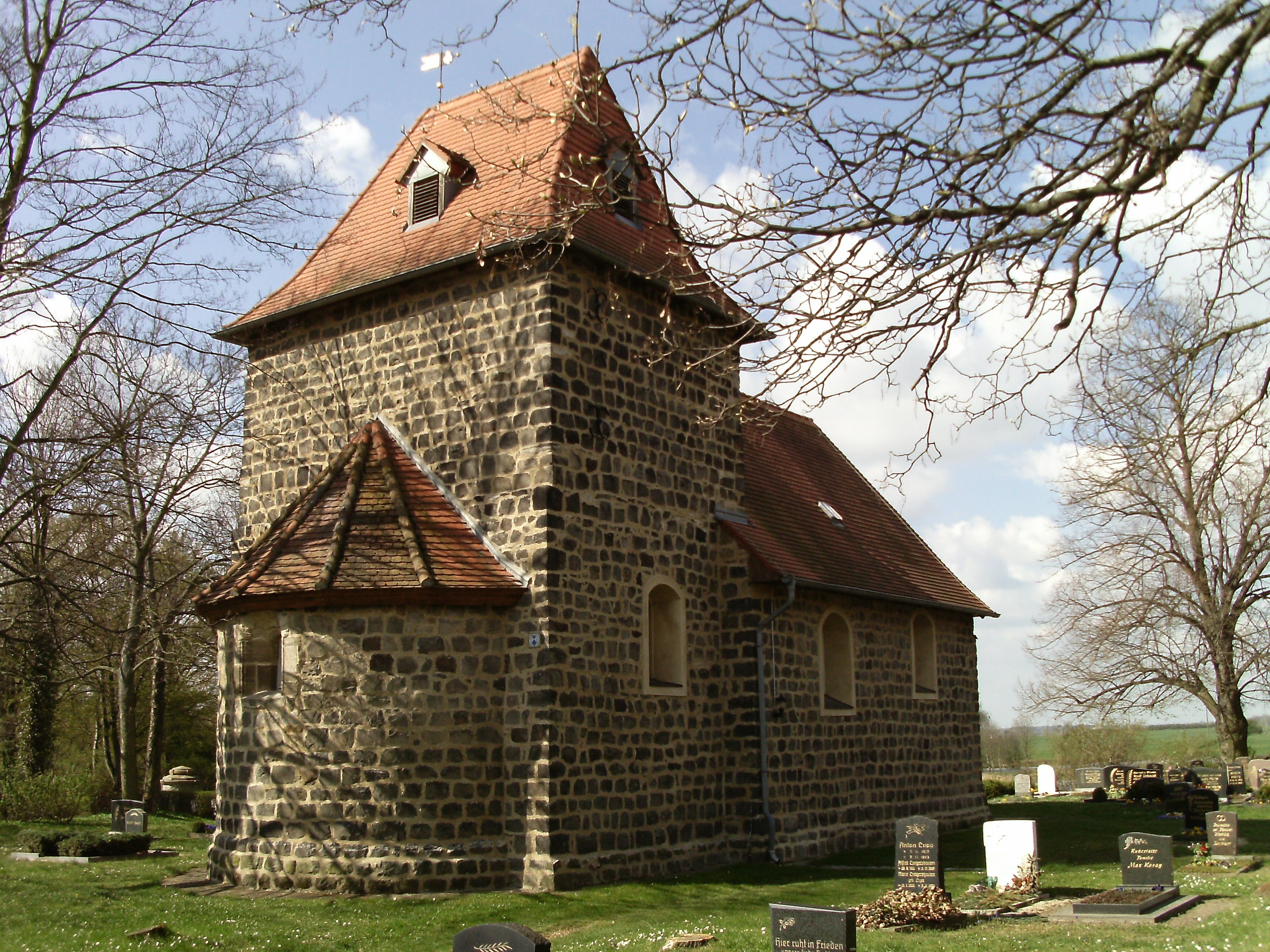
Kulkwitz church

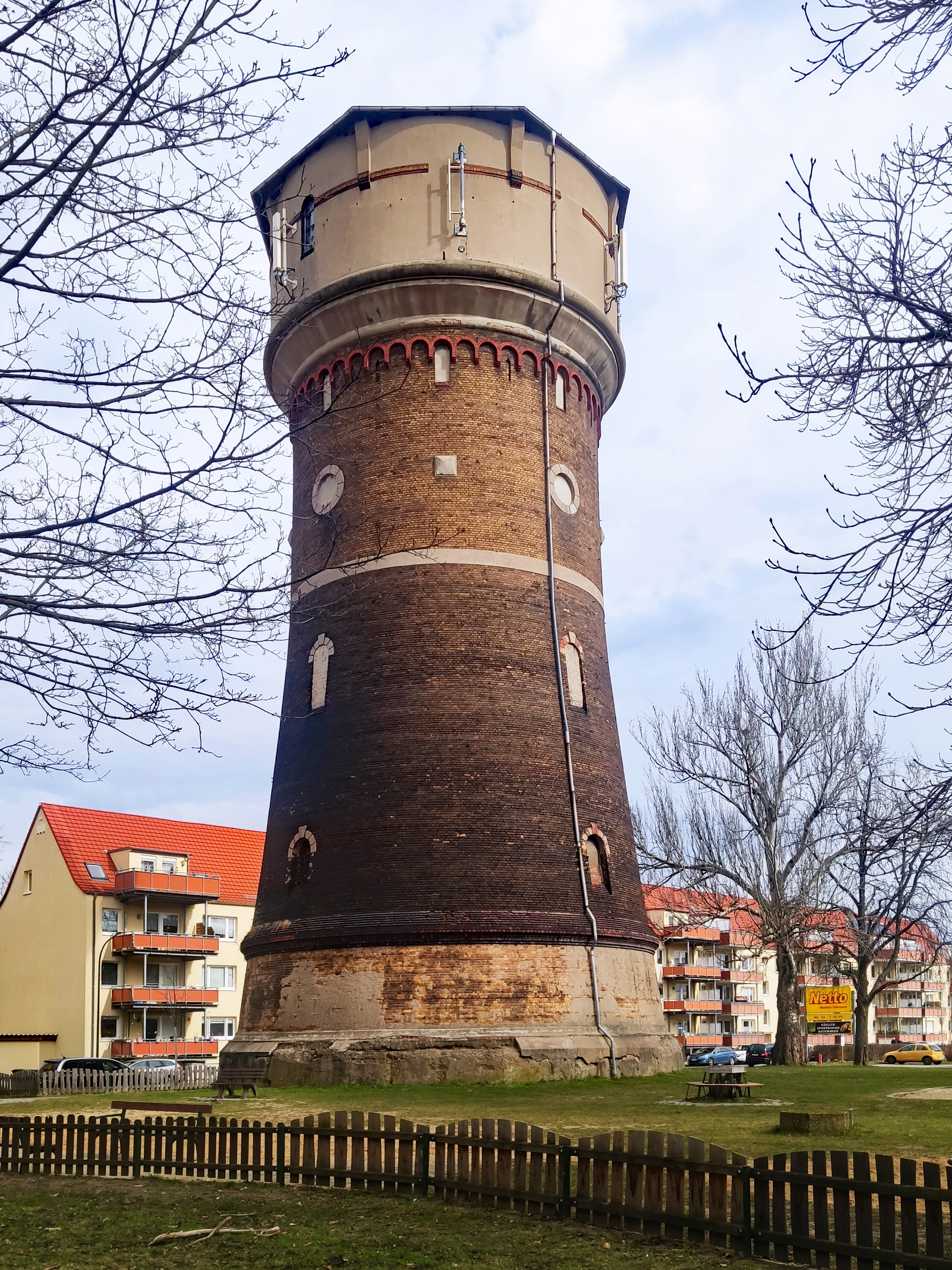
Water tower

== Sports ==
Markranstädt describes itself as a "sports town". The women's handball team of SC Markranstädt plays in the 2nd division of the German League. The men of Markrandstädt Volleyball Club reached the quarterfinal of the 1st division of the German League in 2006. In the same year, the club merged with VV Leipzig to become VC Leipzig. Markranstädt "sports town" club offers a large number of sports, the largest section of which is football, SSV Markranstädt.

RB Leipzig used SSV Markranstädt´s license in the 2009/10 season to enter the German league system in the fifth division. The SSV Markranstädt first team currently plays in the NOFV-Oberliga Süd. The Junior-A team also plays in the State League.

== Infrastructure ==
The proximity to the city of Leipzig and to the Leipzig/Halle Airport (12 km), two interchanges with the motorway A 9, two interchanges with the A 38 and the train station feeding in to the MDV Transport network of Central Germany provide good transport infrastructure. The national roads B 87 and B 186 also intersect in the area of the town.
