= Auensee (Leipzig) =

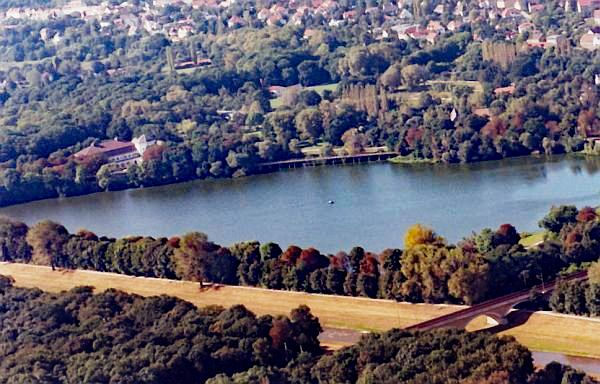
- Auensee in Leipzig, seen from southeast

- Location within Saxony
- Location: Leipzig, Germany
- Coordinates: 51°22′8″N 12°19′10″E
- Type: Artificial lake
- Basin countries: Germany
- Max. length: ca. 400 m (1,300 ft)
- Max. width: ca. 300 m (980 ft)
- Surface area: 12 ha (30 acres)
- Average depth: 3 m (9.8 ft)
- Max. depth: 8 m (26 ft)
- Surface elevation: 100.7 m (330 ft)
- References: Regionaler Planungsverband Leipzig-Westsachsen. Regionale Planungsstelle Leipzig, ed. (2015). Mitteldeutsche Seenlandschaft. Gewässerkatalog 2015-2017. Seen, Fließgewässer, Kanäle (in German) (5th ed.). p. 196. ISBN 978-3-00-048526-8.

Auensee (Meadow Lake) is a 12 ha (30 acres) lake with a park in the borough northwest of Leipzig in Germany, in the locality of Wahren. The lake is part of the Leipzig Riverside Forest. Haus Auensee located at the lake is a venue for cultural events and concerts.

== Body of water ==
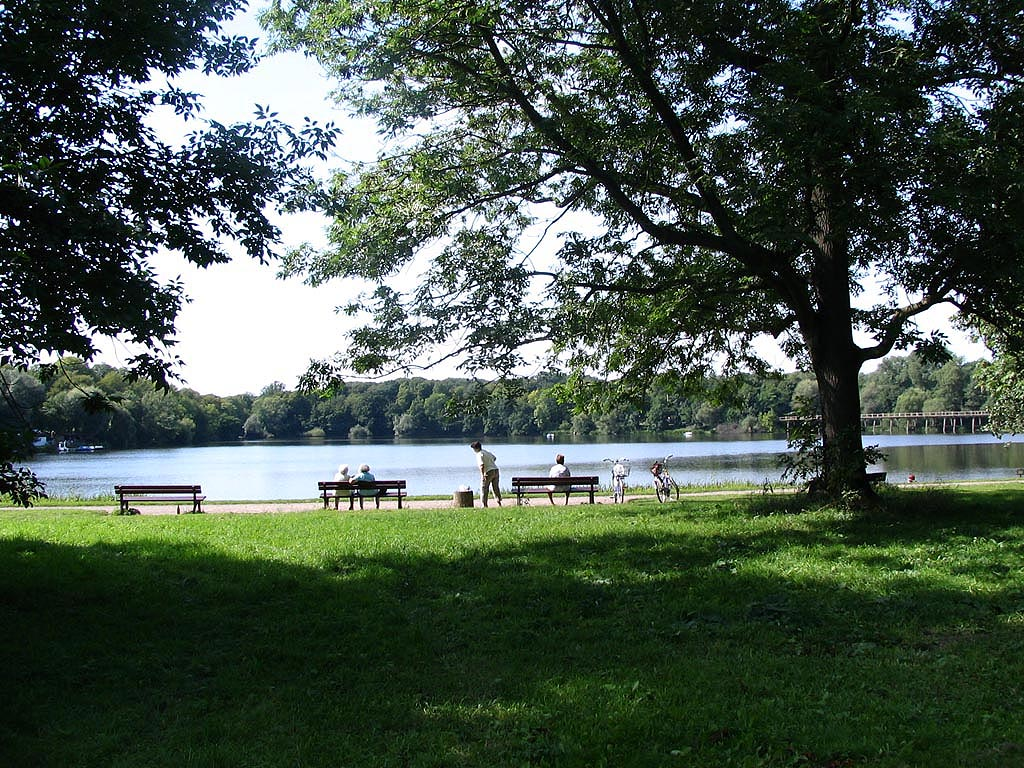
Auensee, eastern shore

The Auensee lies between the water bodies of White Elster and Neue Luppe. It originated from a gravel pit in which the Willybald Hoffmann company extracted gravel for the construction of Leipzig Central Station. In 1908, the Bank für Grundbesitz Leipzig planned to transform this pit into a "large water facility" with a park for amusement purposes. For this reason, from 1913 onwards, the pit was connected to the Hundewasser, a tributary of the White Elster, and flooded, which caused it to become heavily silted. The resulting body of water was given the name "Auensee". The Hundewasser touched the Auensee on its northern shore and thus provided inflow and outflow. However, the construction of the Neue Luppe, completed in 1934, interrupted the flow of the Hundewasser and was filled in the same year. Since then, the lake has had no inflow or outflow, but is fed by groundwater.

The average depth of the lake is 3 metres (9.8 feet), with the deepest point being 8 metres (26 feet). The lake has predominantly steep shores covered with various deciduous trees (willow, birch and beech). Only the eastern and northeastern shores are shallow and treeless.

The vegetation includes various marsh and aquatic plants, especially cattails and bur-reeds, pondweed plants as well as Poaceae and sedge grasses.

The water quality of the Auensee lake was critical from the late 1970s onward, so much so that in 1979 a swimming ban had to be imposed due to the risk of salmonella, which remains in place today. Although it has improved in recent years, the lake is considered hypertrophic, its condition unstable, and visibility is below 1 metre (3 feet 3 inches).

The lake is home to carp, northern pike, zander, eels, and various whitefish. The lake is leased by the German Anglers' Association and maintained by the Leipzig-Gohlis Fishing Club.

At the beginning of August 2008 there was another major fish kill. The reason for this was a lack of oxygen, which had arisen due to the constant sunlight, lack of rain and low air pressure. In addition, strong winds caused oxygen-poor layers of water to rise to the surface. The first to be affected were the sensitive zander, followed by pike, bream and grass carp weighing up to 15 kilograms (33 lb). In total, several tons of fish carcasses were removed from the water. After the fish kill became known, pumps were immediately installed to improve the oxygen content. Live fish were fished out and relocated to the White Elster, as there were fears of total extinction.

In order to improve the water quality in the long term, three deep water aeration systems (TIBEAN) have been used starting in spring 2012 for the next ten years to add oxygen to the lake. Nevertheless, there was another fish kill in September 2024.

== Attractions ==
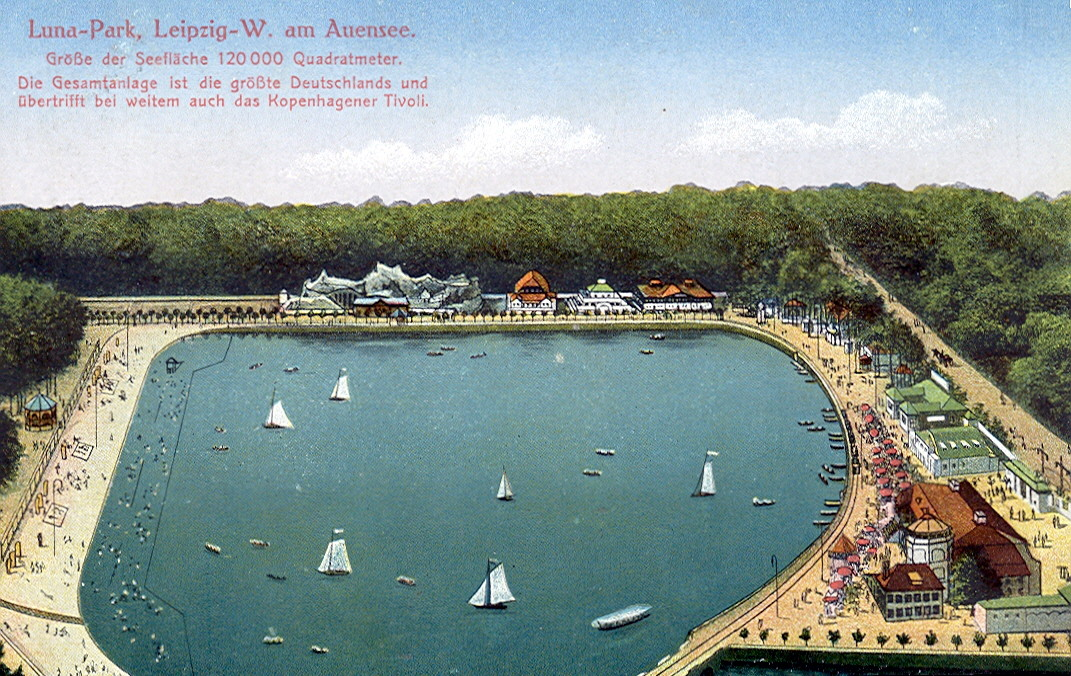
Luna Park (1914)

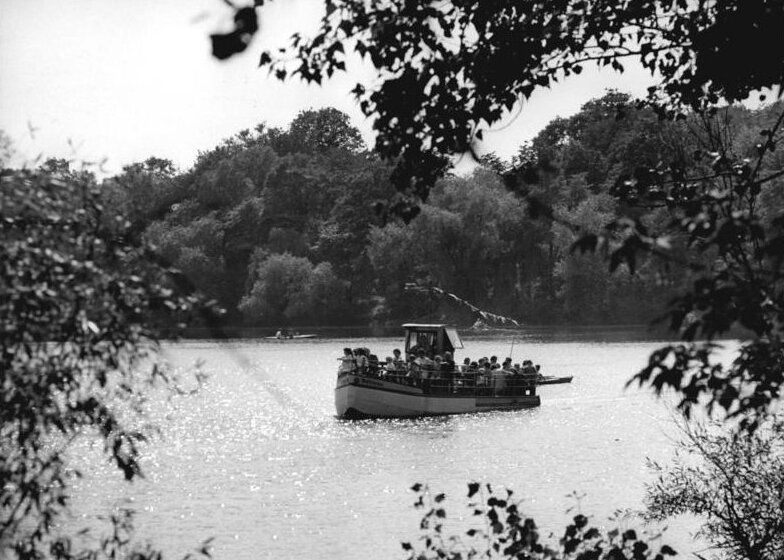
Motor ship „Weltfrieden“ (World Peace) on the Auensee (1965)

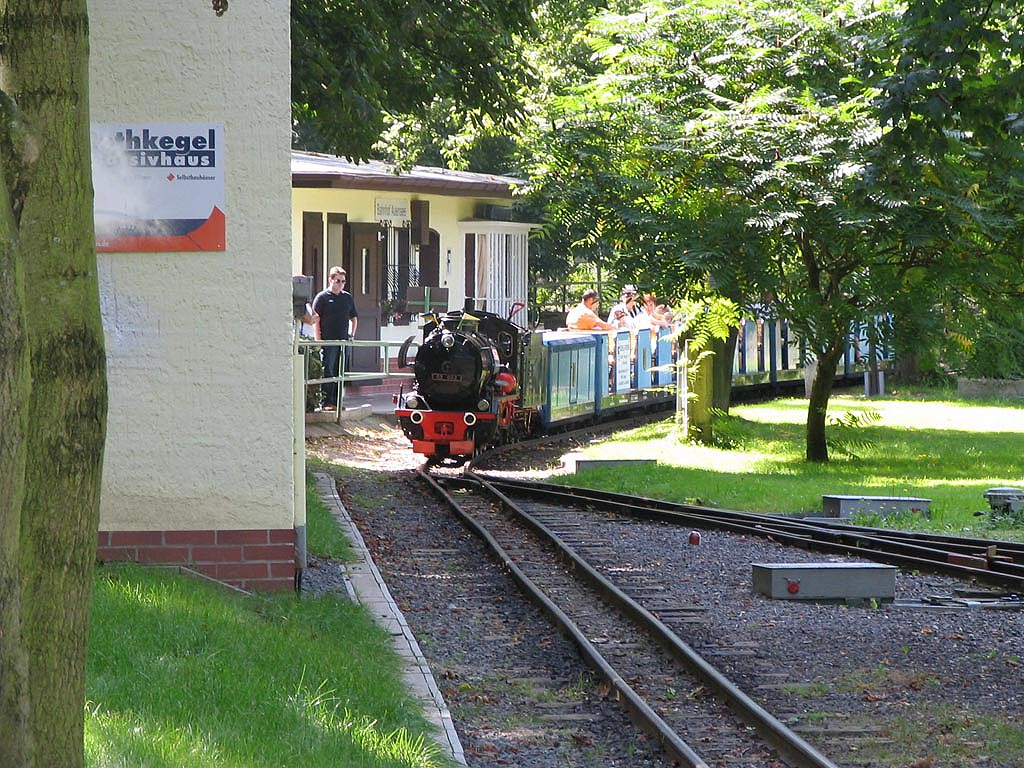
Minimum-gauge railway

In 1914, an amusement park, the Luna Park, was built here. It was auctioned off in 1931, closed in 1932, and largely demolished after 1934. All that remains of it is the main restaurant, which was renamed Haus Auensee in 1936. Today it is mainly used for concerts. Until 2020, the Auensee Bridge also served as a reminder of the park. The bridge spanned a bay on the northern shore of the lake. Originally, the Auensee was connected to the White Elster River here via the Hundewasser. The Luna Express, a narrow-gauge railway that ran around the lake, therefore required a bridge. The bridge became obsolete with the closure and demolition of the insolvent Luna Park and the filling in of the Hundewasser in 1934, but it was still accessible until the early 1980s and was only demolished in 2020.

A miniature railway, the Leipziger Parkeisenbahn (Leipzig Park Railway), has been running around the Auensee since 1951. The current railway was operated as a children's railway until the German reunification, and since 1990 it has been called Leipziger Parkeisenbahn.

There is a boat and bicycle rental at the lake.

The Camping & Motel Auensee campsite has been located near the Auensee, separated from it only by the Gustav-Esche-Strasse, since 1969.

== Sports ==
=== Swimming ===
For decades, the Auensee was used for swimming, including for swimming events. On 13 and 14 August 1921, the 30th German Swimming Federation Festival took place in the Auensee. It was at the same time official German Swimming Championships, organized by the Poseidon Swimming Club in the converted former military pool. Pontoons were used to create a pool with 100 metres (330 feet) lanes, and there was also a wooden diving platform.

Herbert Heinrich, competing for Poseidon, won the 100 meters in 1:05.2 minutes and set the German record for the 400 meters in freestyle swimming in 5:38.2 minutes. F. Wiesel of ASV Leipzig won the third championship title for Leipzig in diving. The specially constructed 100-meter lanes were used again the following year for the 1. Deutsche Arbeiter Turn- und Sportfest.

Leipzig's citizens enjoyed using this "bathtub" and numerous generations learned to swim there. Due to the rapidly declining water quality in the 1970s, a general swimming ban was imposed in 1979, and the swimming pool was dismantled.

=== Running ===
The Auensee is a popular meeting place for runners. From 1980 to 1990, the Auensee Marathon took place annually in April. It was a marathon over four laps in the Leipzig Riverside forest, the second Leipzig marathon alongside the Leipzig Marathon, which had been running since 1977. Since 1990, the ultramarathon Leipziger 100-km-Lauf (Leipzig 100 km (62 mi), also known as the 100 km Run at the Auensee) has taken place in September or (since 1997) August, on the same route but over ten laps. It also includes a 50 km (31 mi) running competition. The event is organized by the Laufclub Auensee e. V. Leipzig, which also organizes several shorter running competitions throughout the year, as well as a practically weekly running meet-up for everyone at the Auensee.

== Miscellaneous ==
Meadow Lake is the English term for Auensee, and Meadow Lake Music GmbH is therefore the name of the record label of Matthias Winkler, managing director of MAWI Konzert GmbH with Haus Auensee as its concert venue.

== See also ==
- Bodies of water in Leipzig
