= Leipzig City Harbour =

Leipzig City Harbour German: Stadthafen Leipzig
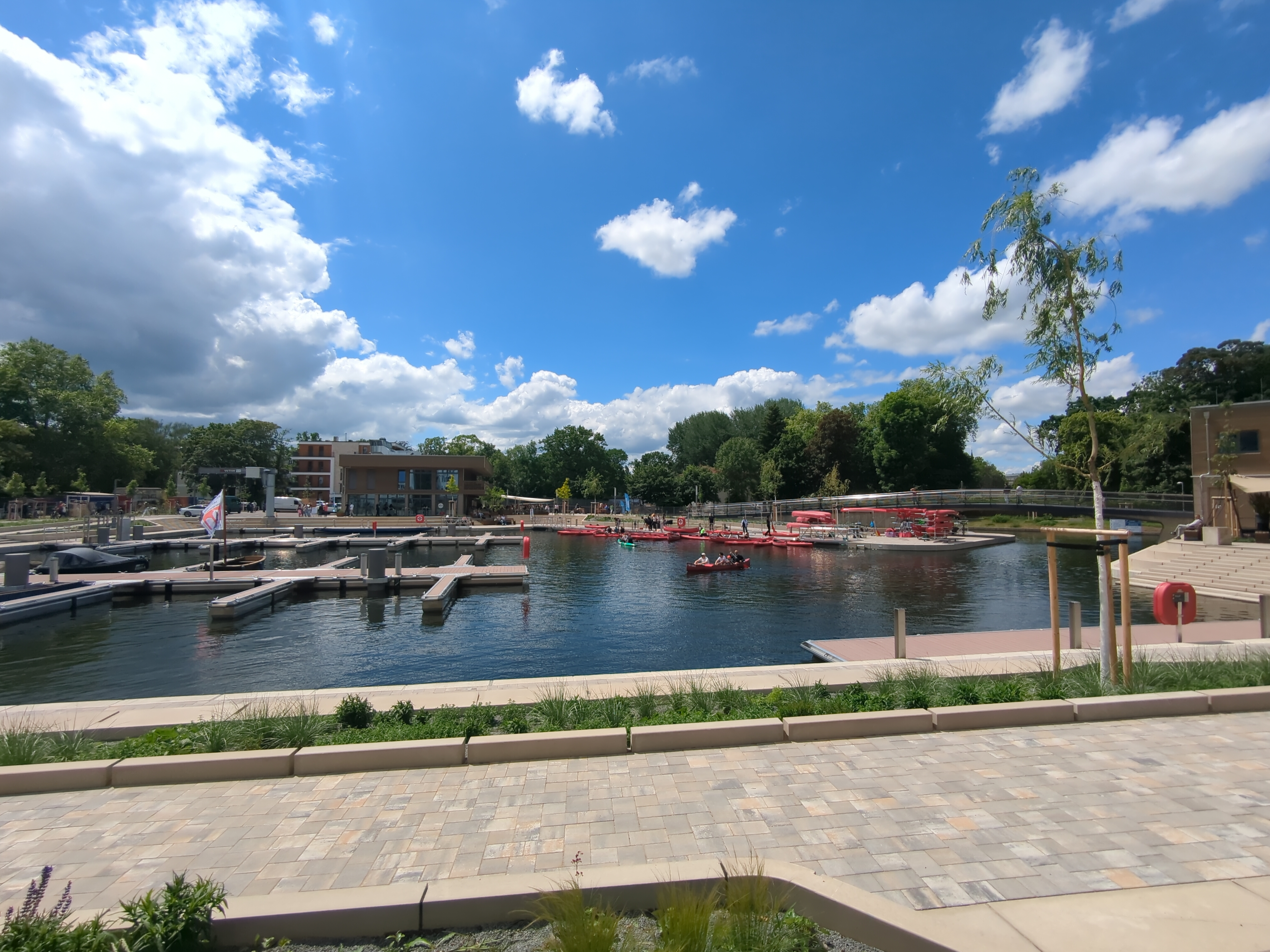
- Leipzig City Harbour, Leipzig, Germany
- Interactive map of Leipzig City Harbour; German: Stadthafen Leipzig

Location
- Country: Germany
- Location: Leipzig
- Coordinates: 51°20′20.8″N 12°21′37.9″E

Details
- Opened: 5 Juni 2026
- Type of Harbor: leisure harbour for individual boats and passenger boats, marina
- Size of harbour: 0.4 hectares (0.99 acres)
- Land area: 1.38 hectares (3.4 acres)

Statistics
- Website https://www.stadthafen-leipzig.com/home-2

The Leipzig City Harbour (German: Stadthafen Leipzig) is a leisure harbour in Leipzig, Germany. Close to the city center, it is the gate to Leipzig's waterway network, which extends south to the Lake Cospuden. The harbour offers take-off and berths for individual boats and small passenger ships. There are rental options and a catering service.

== Location ==
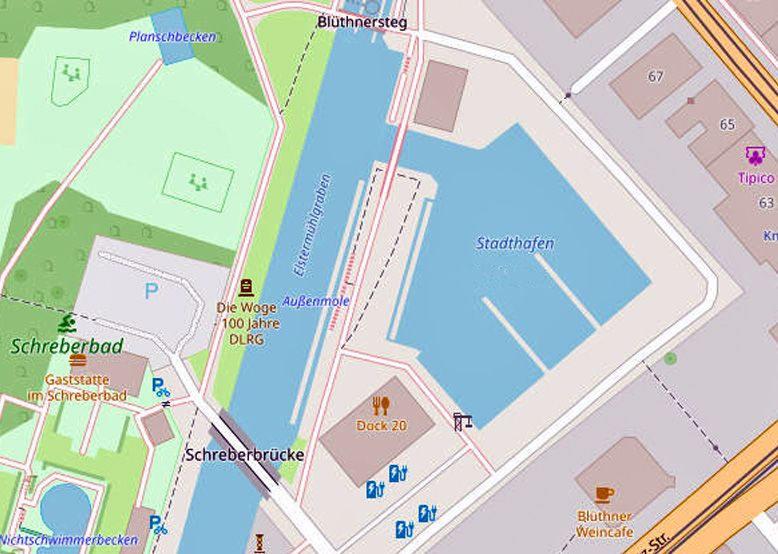
Site plan of Leipzig City Harbour

The city harbour of Leipzig is located in the locality of Zentrum-West. The site has the shape of a triangle and is bordered by the properties of Friedrich-Ebert- and Käthe-Köllwitz-Strasse, by Schreberstrasse and Elstermühlgraben, over which the water connection runs. In relation to the Elstermühlgraben, the city harbour is located between the bridges Schreberbrücke and Blüthnersteg. On the land side, the port can be reached via Schreberstrasse. It is only 1 kilometre (0.62 miles) away from the market square as the crow flies.

== Design ==
The facility with a total area of 1.38 hectares (3.4 acres) contains the inner harbour basin with an area of 0.4 hectares (0.99 acres) as a central element. This is irregularly designed and is reminiscent of the shape of a concert grand piano. This can probably be understood as a homage to the Julius Blüthner piano factory, which had its production facility here. At two jetties, 40 berths are available for private sports and family boats and 3 for passenger ships. Motorized boats moored here must be purely electrically powered. In addition, there are six places for passenger ships at the newly designed outer pier at Elstermühlgraben. A 3.2-tonne slewing crane is available at the inner basin for launching and unloading boats.

Southwest of the inner harbour basin near the Schreberstrasse entrance is the two-storey service building. Like all buildings in the port, it is built in sustainable wood-hybrid construction and has wooden facades with large windows and a green roof. In addition to rooms for water tourism functions on the ground floor, it houses the DOCK 20 restaurant with 72 seats and a large outdoor terrace, as well as an exclusive event room for special events on the upper floor.

On the north side of the complex are the canoe house for storing boats and two smaller boathouses. The newly built city harbour bridge leads over the entrance to the inner harbour basin near the canoe house, which allows to go around the inner basin.

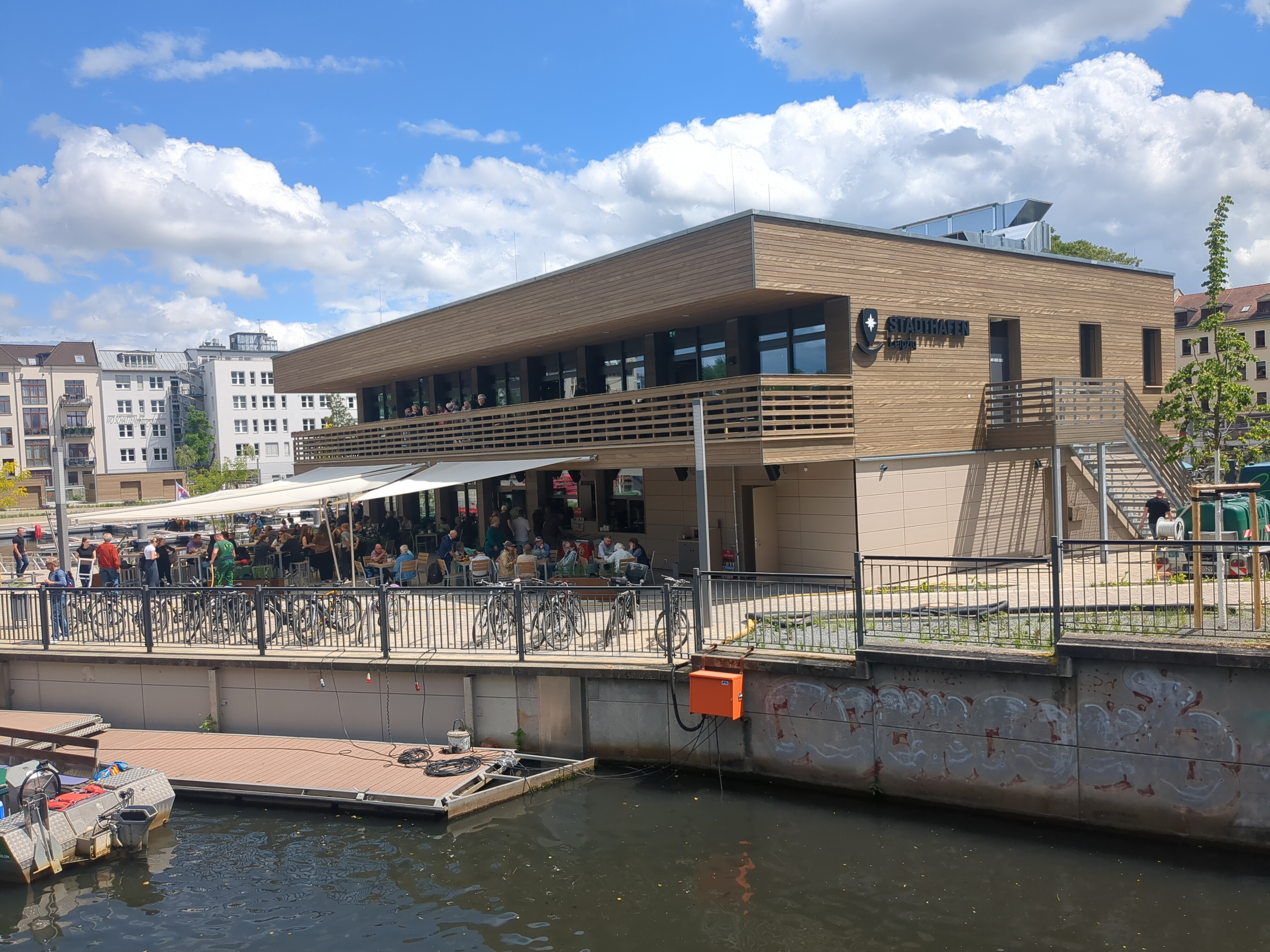
Service building with Elstermühlgraben

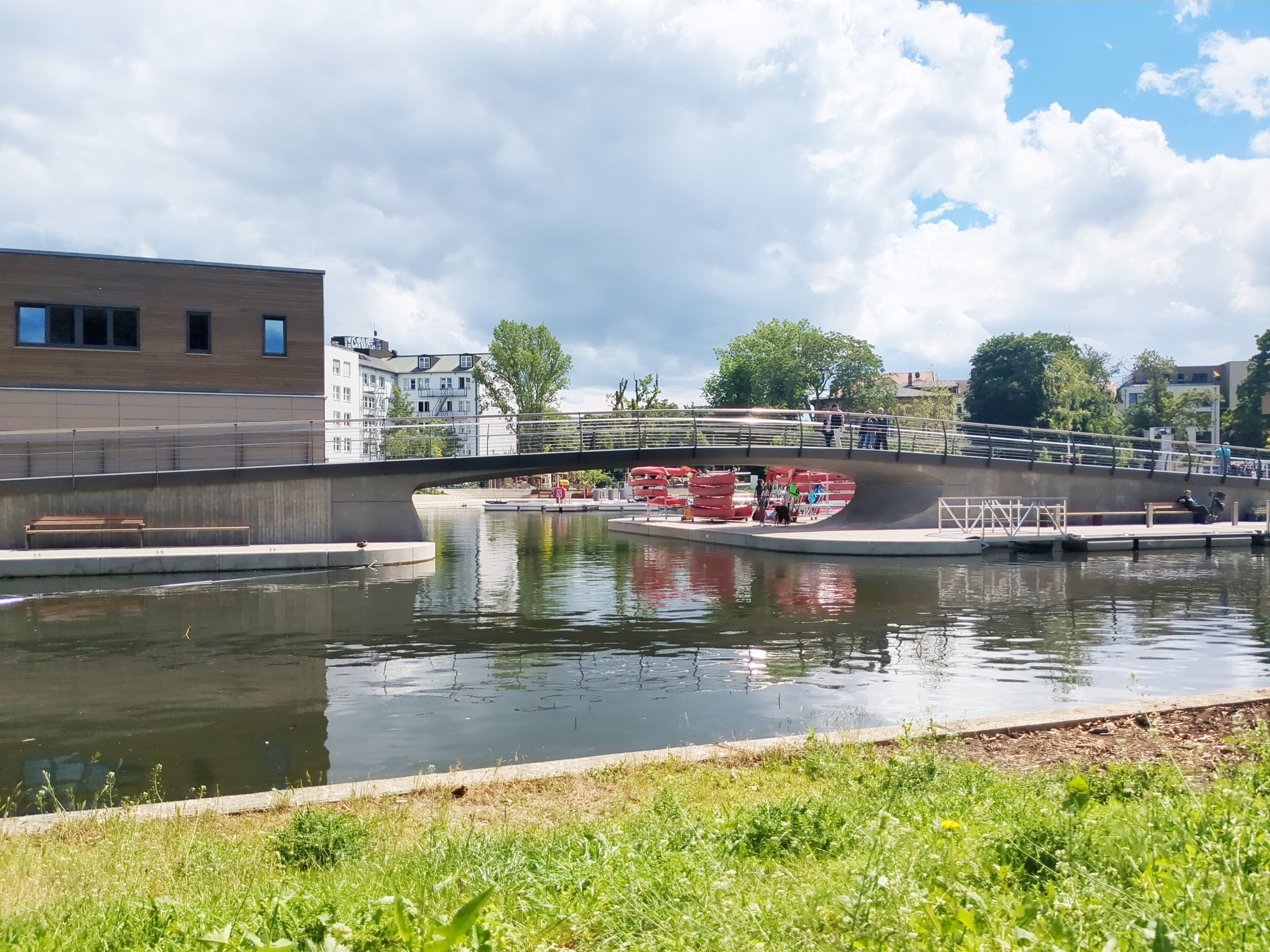
City Harbour Bridge with Canoe House and Harbour Entrance

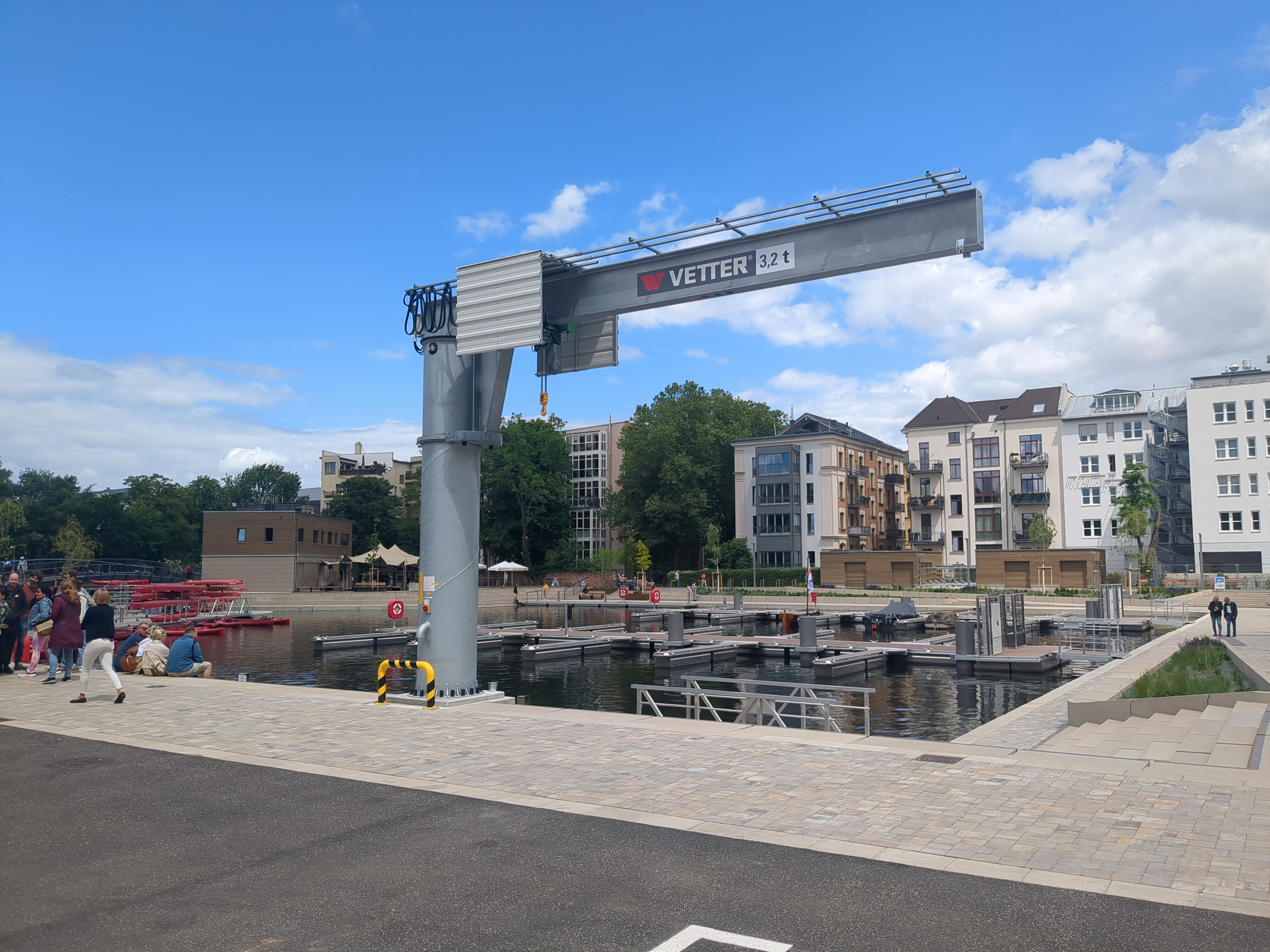
Boat crane

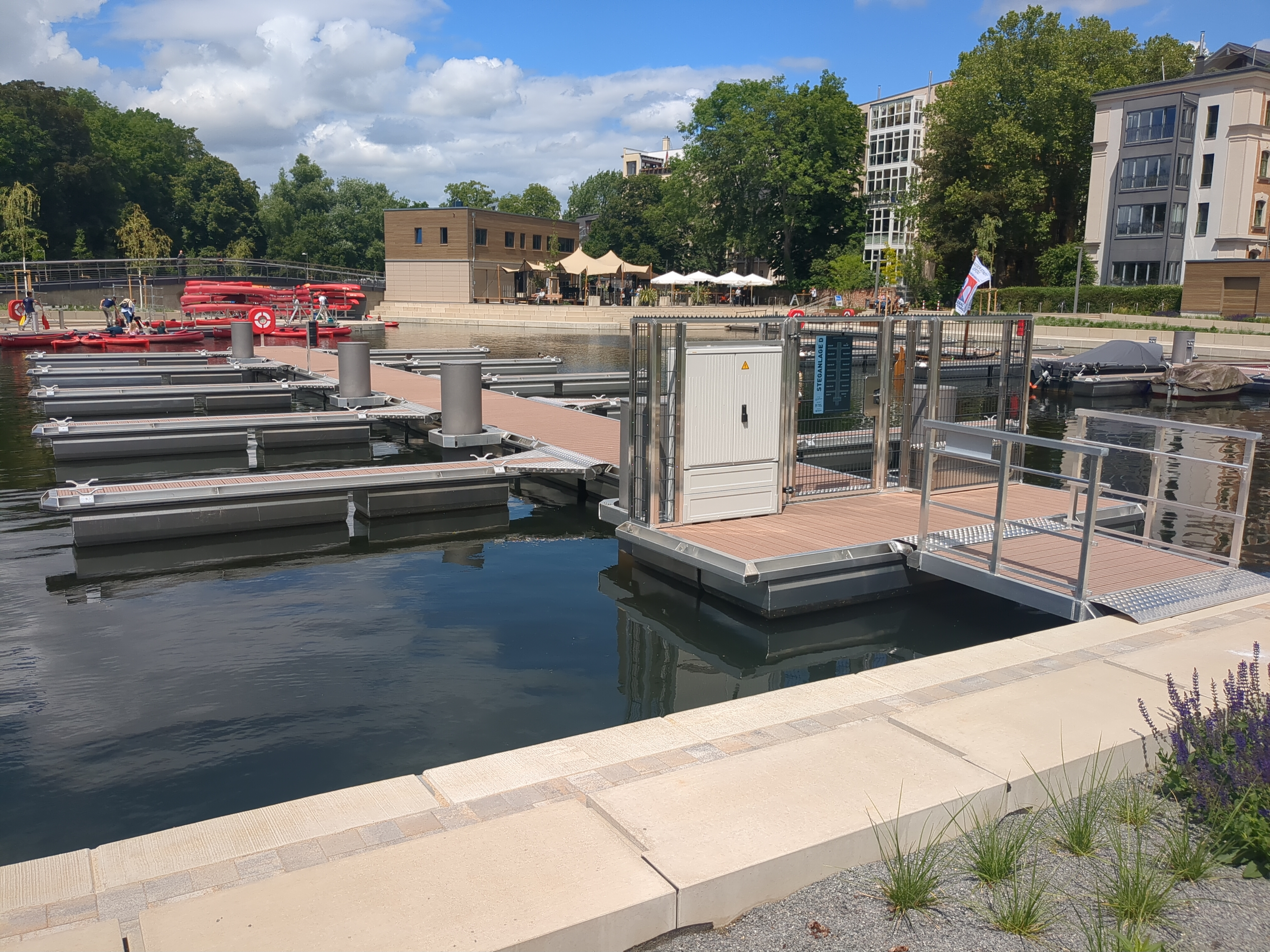
Jetty with berths

== History ==
With the beginning of the opening of Leipzig's watercourses, which had been partially piped during the GDR era due to industrial pollution, after the German reunification new water tourism wishes and opportunities arose. As early as 2008, plans were aimed at building a city harbour near the city centre. On 31 August 2010, the 78 metres (256 feet) long outer pier of the future city harbour was handed over at the reopened Elstermühlgraben near Schreberstrasse. Since no private investor could be found, Stadthafen Leipzig GmbH was founded on 17 March 2014 for the operation and further development. The former canoeist and double world champion Jan Benzien and the head of Leipzig's Olympic bid 2012, Dirk Thärichen, became managing directors.

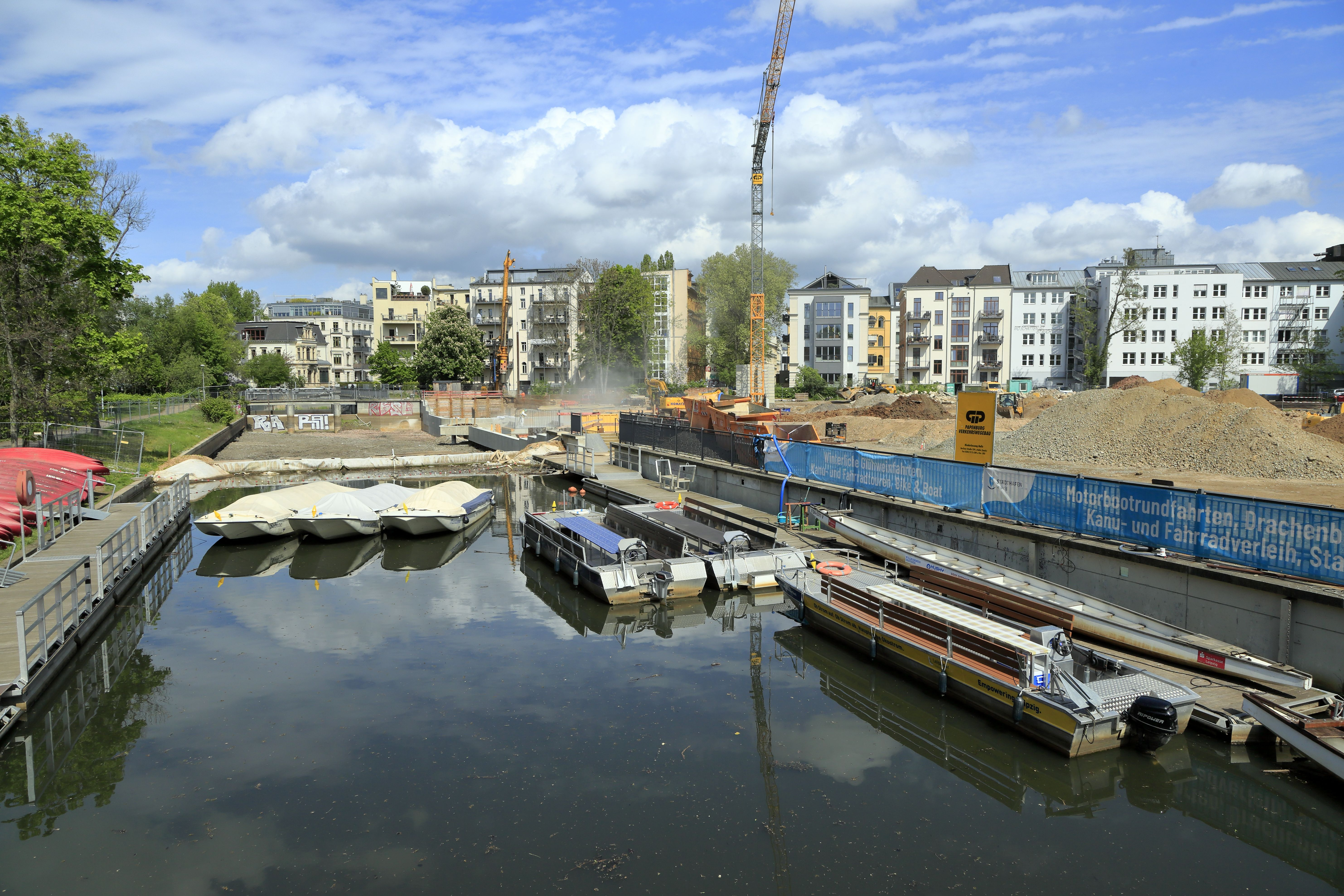
Closure of the Elstermühlgraben by a cofferdam for dry work in the future harbour basin (April 2024)

The further expansion of the port was slowed down for years by a lack of investors and a lack of money, until 2019 when the construction was made possible by the funding of over 6,000,000 euros from the state of Saxony. Nevertheless, after preparatory construction measures from 2021, the official start of construction was not until 2023. In order to be able to carry out the main construction work for the harbour basin in the dry from September 2023, the Elstermühlgraben was closed off by a cofferdam in spring 2023. The flooding of the harbour basin took place in November 2025, after the Elstermühlgraben had dried up due to the annual lowering of the Palmengarten weir and the cofferdam could thus be removed. The ceremonial opening of the Leipzig City Harbour took place on 5 June 2026.
