= Luna Park, Leipzig =

Former amusement park in Germany

Coordinates: 51.370°N 12.321°E

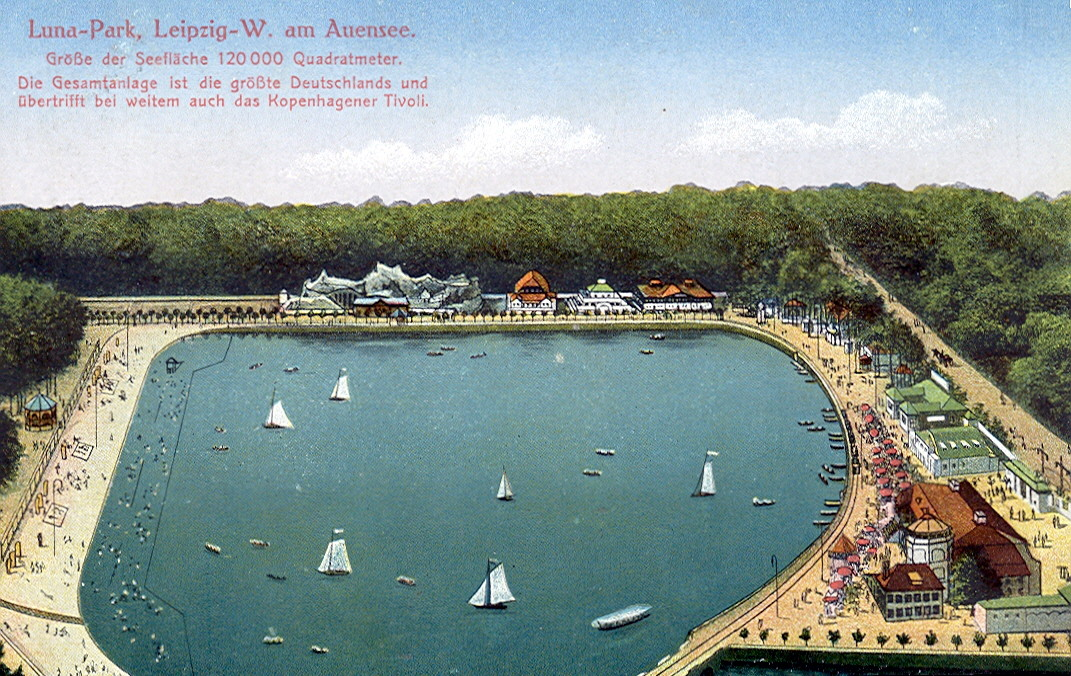
Luna Park, Leipzig post card, ca. 1914. The park surrounded the Auensee lake, a former gravel pit.

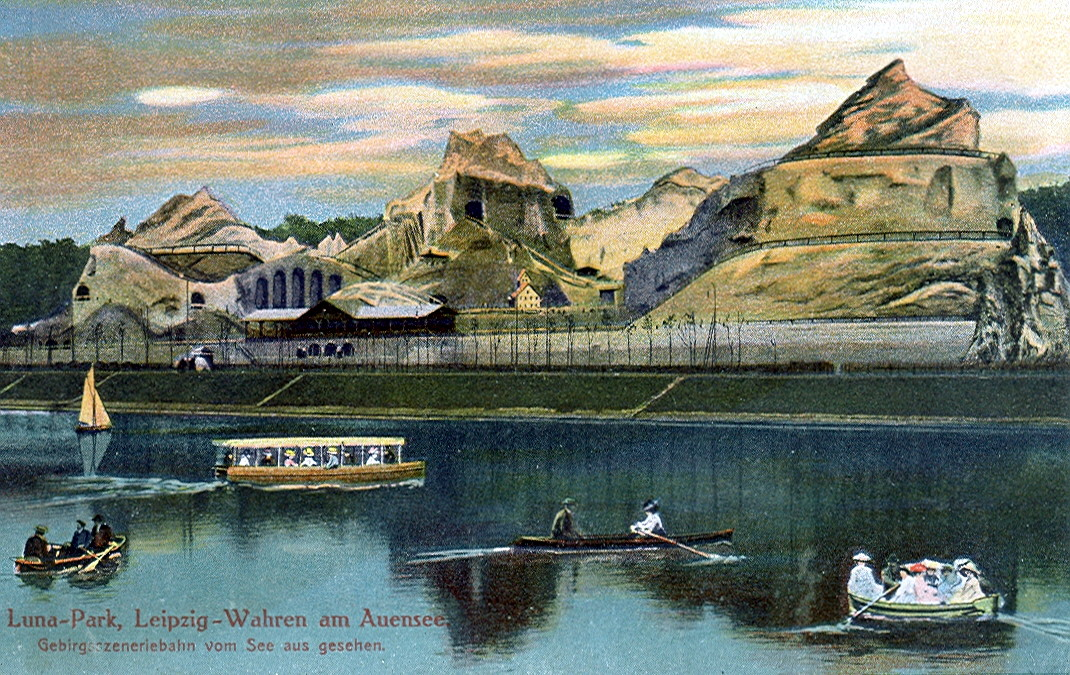
Luna Park, Leipzig, scenic railroad, post card, ca. 1914. Scenic railroads were a staple of Luna Parks of the pre-World War I era.

Luna Park was an amusement park near Leipzig, Germany that existed from 1912 to 1932. It was built around the Lake Auensee, a former gravel pit. The park featured a scenic railroad ride, a hippodrome, a dance hall, restaurants, and a public beach. Immensely popular prior to the onset of World War I, Luna Park's fortunes waned in the latter 1920s and early 1930s as the effects of the Great Depression encircled the world. The park ceased operating as a commercial enterprise on January 13, 1932.

The main restaurant stayed open, even after the close of the park, which eventually became (1941) property of the city of Leipzig.
