= Neuseenland =

Area south of Leipzig, Germany

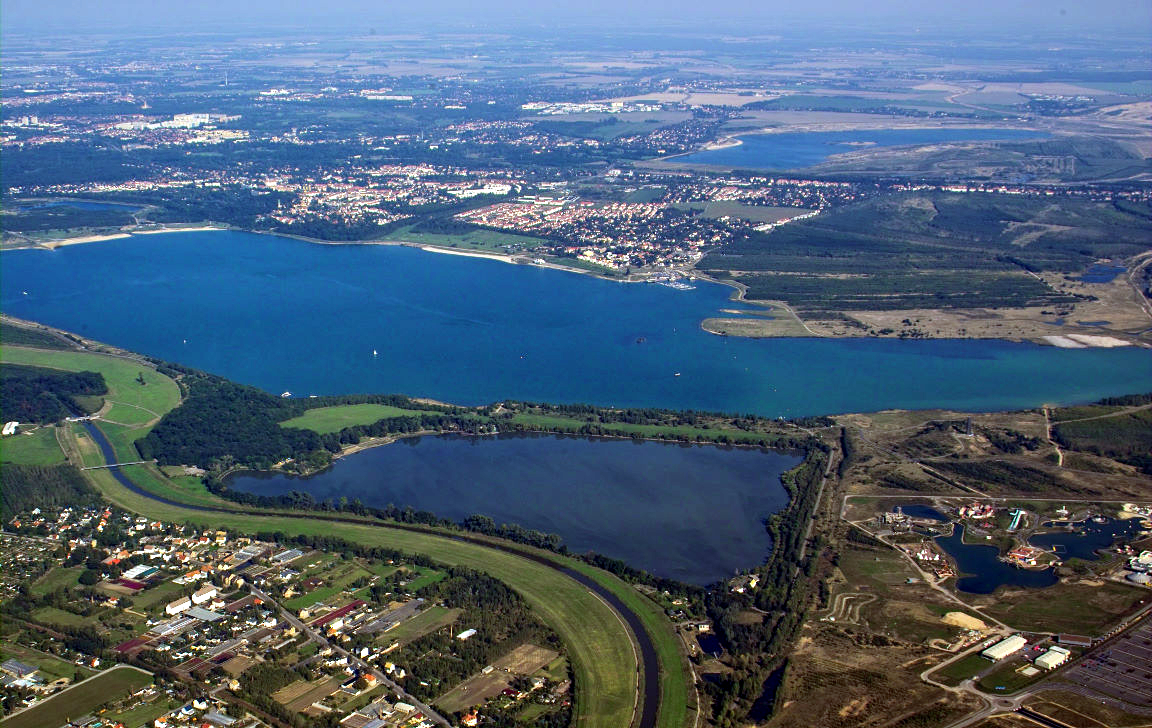
Cospudener See

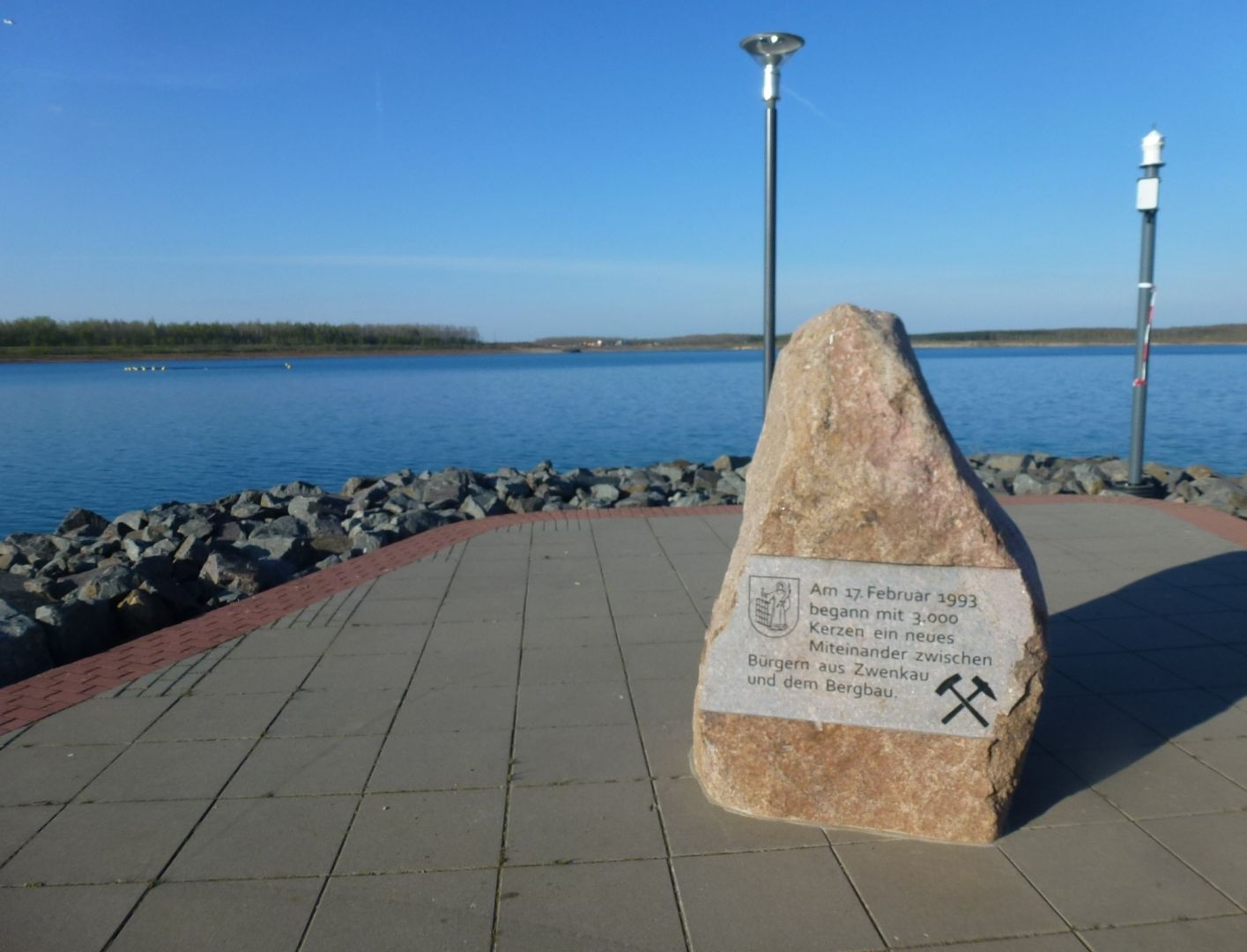
Zwenkauer See

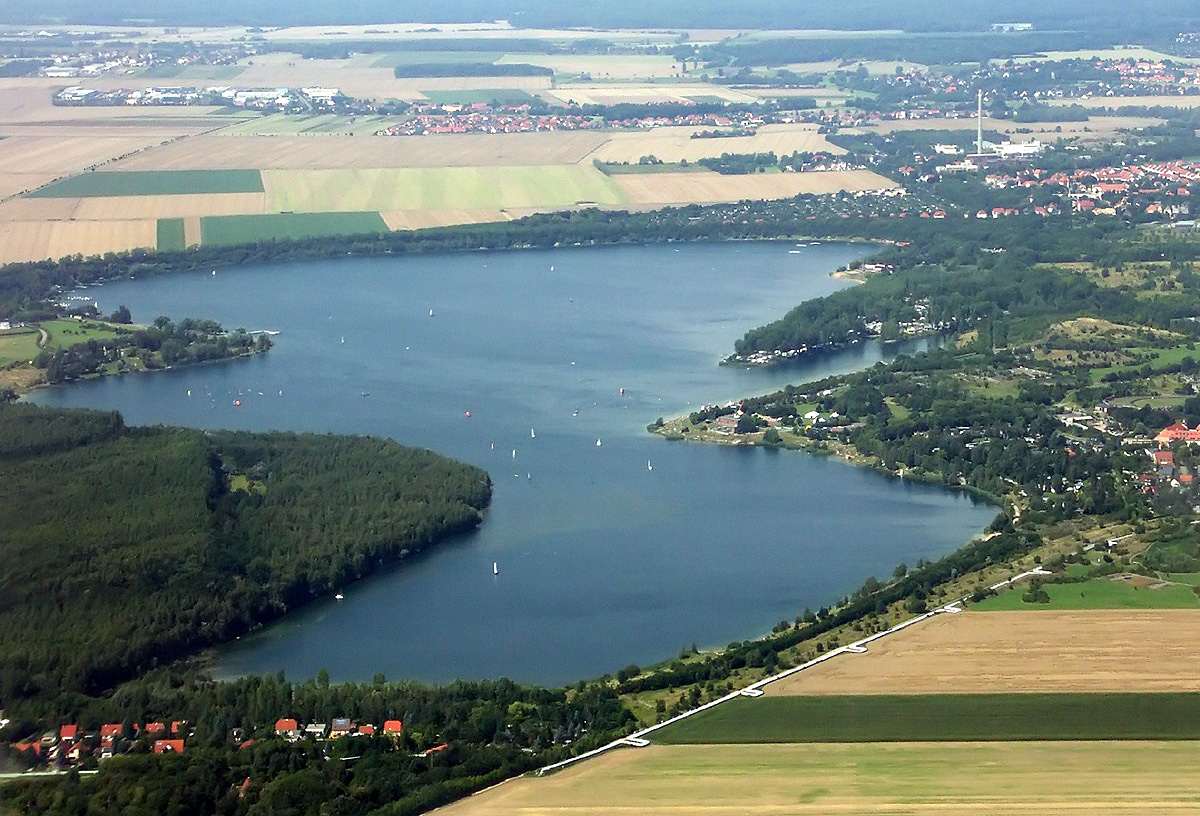
Kulkwitzer See

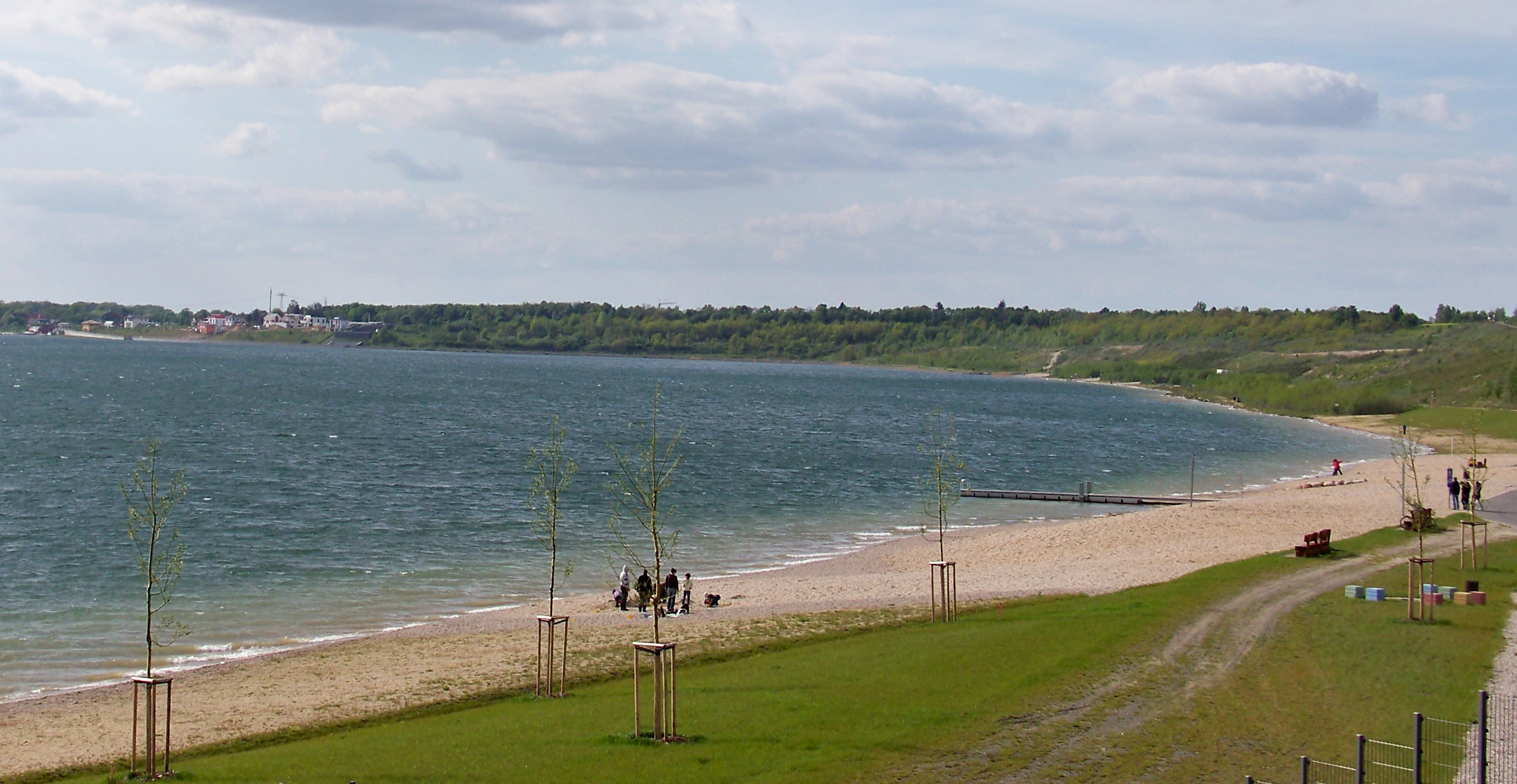
Markkleeberger See

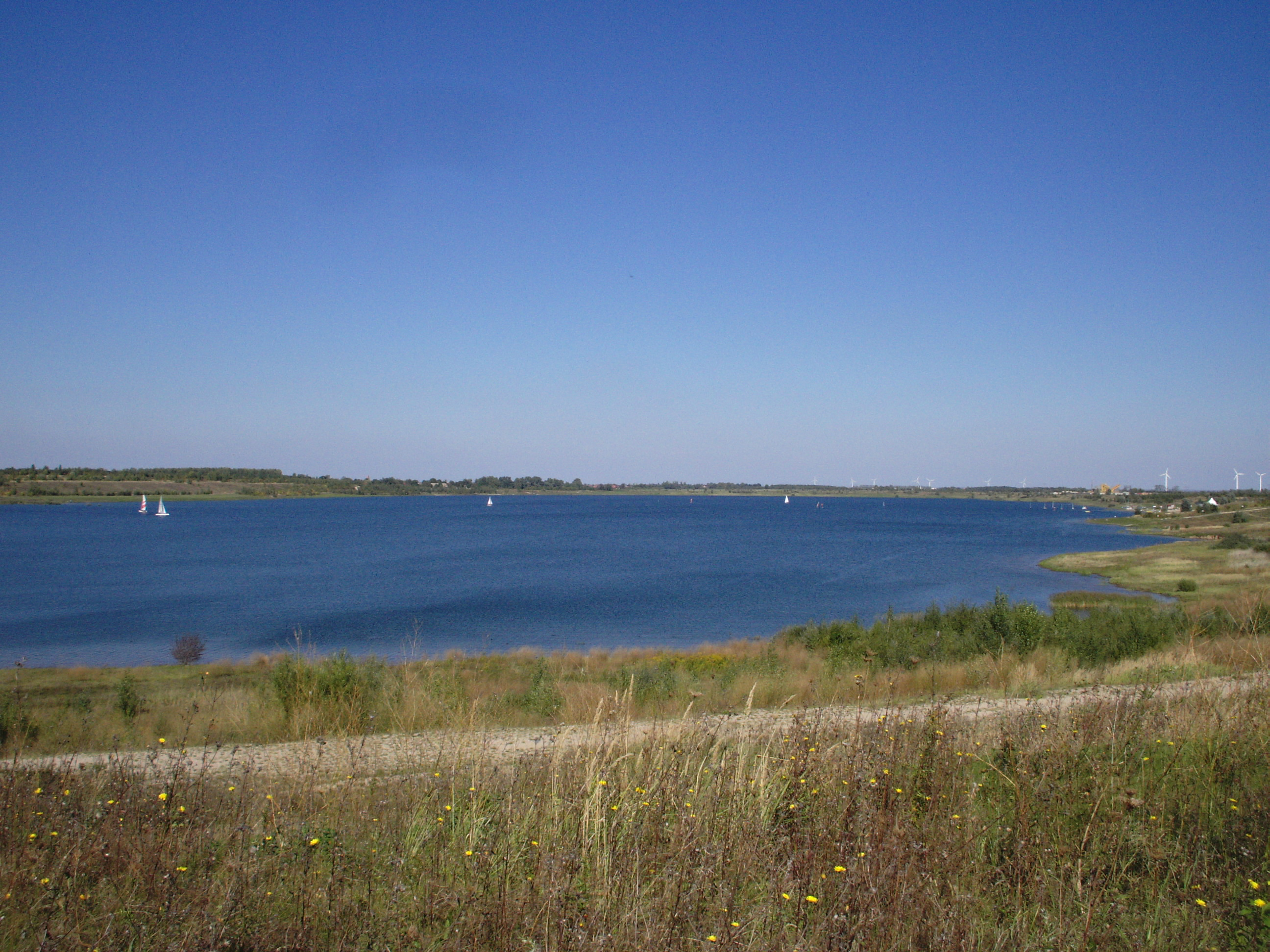
Schladitzer See

Neuseenland is an area south of Leipzig, Germany, where old open-cast mines are being converted into a lake district. Neuseenland includes shares in the district of Leipzig, in the district of Nordsachsen and in the city of Leipzig. The lake network is to cover a water area of around 70 square kilometres (27 sq mi) and be used for tourism as well as for flood protection. It is a part of the larger Central German Lake District.

== Name ==
The region's name is a marketing concept and it means "New land of lakes" in German. It should not be confused with the German name for New Zealand, "Neuseeland". It is planned to be finished in 2060.

== The Lakes ==
It contains the following lakes, some of which are not yet flooded:

Name	Size
Lake Bockwitz (51.13186°N 12.54638°E)	170 hectares (420 acres)
Markkleeberg Lake (51.2655°N 12.4071°E)	252 hectares (620 acres)
Cospuden Lake (51.269444°N 12.33527°E)	436 hectares (1,080 acres)
Schladitz Lake (51.4385°N 12.3356°E)	220 hectares (540 acres)
Hain Lake (51.1688°N 12.4598°E)	387 hectares (960 acres)
Borna Reservoir (51.1105°N 12.4514°E)	265 hectares (650 acres)
Harth Lake (51.0861°N 12.5482°E)	65 hectares (160 acres)
Witznitz Reservoir	236 hectares (580 acres)
Haselbach Lake (51.0834°N 12.3985°E)	335 hectares (830 acres)
Störmthal Lake (51.2342°N 12.4514°E)	730 hectares (1,800 acres)
Haubitz Lake (51.1620°N 12.4878°E)	160 hectares (400 acres)
Werben Lake (51.1952°N 12.2368°E)	80 hectares (200 acres)
Kahnsdorf Lake (51.1761°N 12.4274°E)	112 hectares (280 acres)
Zwenkau Lake (51.2366°N 12.3079°E)	914 hectares (2,260 acres)
Kulkwitz Lake (51.3093°N 12.2480°E)	170 hectares (420 acres)
Peres Lake (51.1290°N 12.3847°E)	699 hectares (1,730 acres)
Lake Groitzsch	840 hectares (2,100 acres)

== Olympic bid ==
As part of the city of Leipzig's bid for the 2012 Olympic Games, the Neuseenland was intended for competitions in sports such as rowing, canoeing, canoe slalom, tennis, mountain biking, cycling, clay pigeon shooting, triathlon and beach volleyball. The Markkleeberg canoe park was built for this purpose in Markkleeberg.

== See also ==
- Bodies of water in Leipzig
- Leipzig City Harbour

== Bibliography ==
- Berkner, Andreas (2005). "Leipzig im Zentrum der "Neuen Wasserlandschaft Mitteldeutschlands"". In Schmidt, Helga; Mayer, Gudrun; Wiktorin, Dorothea; Tzschaschel, Sabine; Blenck, Jürgen (eds.). Der Leipzig-Atlas (in German). Herrmann-Josef Emons Verlag. pp. 142–143. ISBN 3-89705-269-5.
