= Cospudener See =

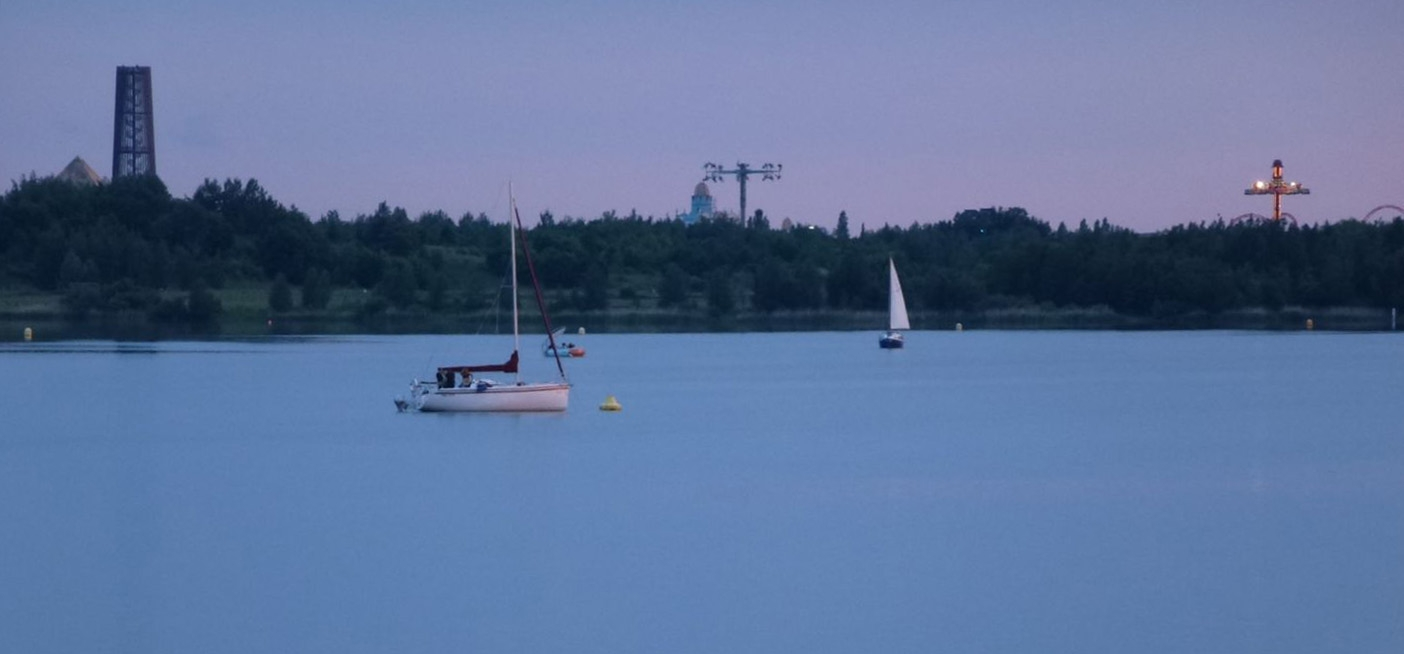

- Location within Saxony
- Location: Saxony
- Coordinates: 51°16′10″N 12°20′7″E
- Type: artificial lake
- Primary outflows: Neuer Floßgraben → Batschke → Pleisse → White Elster → Saale → Elbe → North Sea
- Basin countries: Germany
- Max. length: 4 km (2.5 mi)
- Max. width: 1.7 km (1.1 mi)
- Surface area: 4.39 km^{2} (1.69 sq mi)
- Average depth: 25 m (82 ft)
- Max. depth: 54 m (177 ft)
- Water volume: 109 million cubic metres (88,000 acre⋅ft)
- Shore length^{1}: 10.5 km (6.5 mi)
- Surface elevation: 110 m (360 ft)
- Settlements: Leipzig, Markkleeberg, Zwenkau
- ^{1} Shore length is not a well-defined measure.

The Cospudener See (sometimes translated as Lake Cospuden) is an artificially constructed lake situated directly on the southern outskirts of Leipzig, Germany. Leipzig, Markkleeberg and Zwenkau have shares in the lake which is on the site of a former open cast mine. The lake is popularly known as "Cossi", more rarely "Cospi", and has become highly popular with the local population, with long stretches of sand beaches (some clothing-optional, following the East German tradition of public nude bathing) and with a sauna directly located at the lake. There is also a small sailing harbor. The lake is a part of the Central German Lake District.

== Etymology of the name Cospuden ==
The name comes from the owner of the seigneurial domain (Rittergut) located there: Heinricus de Kozebude around 1216. The name then evolved from Kozbude (1240), Kossebude (1350), Kossebode (1378), Kostworde (1564) to Kospuden in 1875. Otto von Dieskau built a paper mill here in 1599. It became a hamlet to which Johann Sebastian Bach refers in his Peasant Cantata written in 1740. Cospuden is then attached to the municipality of Gautzsch in 1875 which is in turn attached to Markkleeberg 1934. The population was 54 in 1871.

== Origin of the lake ==
The opening of the Cospuden opencast mine (1981) as a branch from the Zwenkau opencast mine coincided with the radical coal mining policy that had been in operation in the GDR since the mid-1970s, in which the aim was to maximize the use of domestic lignite as a result of the oil crisis. The opencast mine was to be operated in several fields with an annual output of approx. 5-6 million tons until around 1996. The excavation of the floodplain landscape of the White Elster, which is used for agriculture and forestry, destroyed a hitherto popular local recreation area south of Leipzig. In addition, several small settlements, such as the former manor Lauer, were devastated and resettled a total of 43 residents. The eponymous village of Cospuden (38 inhabitants), whose inhabitants had already been resettled in 1974 in connection with the Zwenkau opencast mine, was finally dredged over in the course of 1981. The economic structural change and massive acceptance problems in the population resulted in the establishment of the broad citizen initiative Stop Cospuden in 1989. This led to the suspension of production in 1992. Until then, the opencast mine had taken up an excavation area of 5.1 km^{2} (2.0 sq mi) and delivered around 32 million tons of lignite to the surrounding processing companies.

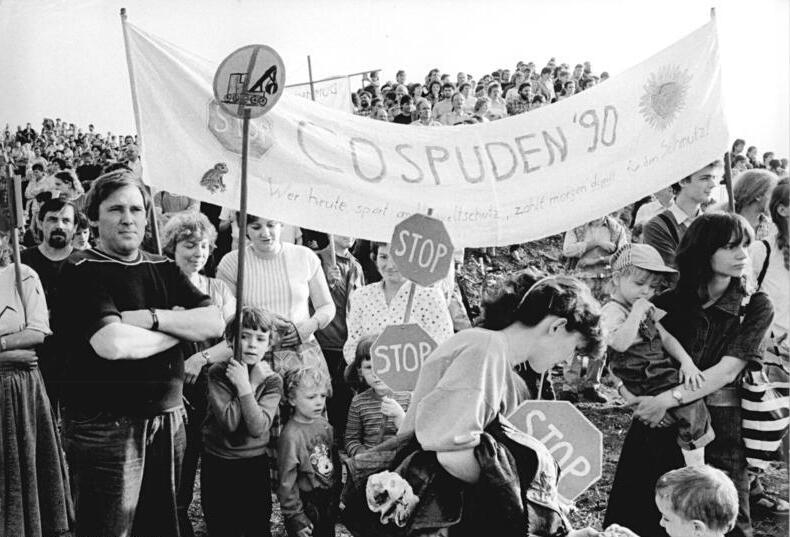
Protesting against the open pit mining Cospuden (1990)

Due to the location on the immediate outskirts of Leipzig, the GDR's re-use plan already provided for the remaining hole to be completely filled with water after the end of production and for the creation of leisure-oriented re-use options. This core idea was retained in the revitalization of the site. The lake reached its final water level of 110 m (360 ft) above sea level in the spring of 2000 due to the inflow of groundwater and precipitation water as well as pit water from the Zwenkau opencast mines (from 1994) and Profen (from 1998) with neutral water conditions.

This made the Cospudener See the first mining lake in the Neuseenland of Leipzig that could be handed over to subsequent use. The advantage in terms of time compared to the other lakes and the location close to the city and with good transport connections caused the comparatively rapid establishment of the demanding leisure facilities in the vicinity of the lake. In terms of scope, these extend far beyond the legally prescribed revitalization services and also beyond the forms of use at comparable residual lakes, since the Cospudener See was viewed as a model project for the possibilities of designing a post-mining landscape. The financing and implementation of the plans was essentially due to the subject of Expo 2000's motto "man - nature - technology", in which the Cospudener See took part as a decentralized contribution of the city of Leipzig. It was the focus of the contribution "landscape use - landscape care". The Expo was the occasion and motor for the revitalization of the Cospuden opencast mine site.

== Usage ==
=== Overview ===
During the revegetation, a local recreation area with a beach and landscape park was laid out around the lake and opened as part of Expo 2000 on 1 June 2000. The leisure activities are for sunbathing and swimming and are well accepted by sailors, windsurfers, kite surfers, inline skaters, divers and cyclists, so that the Cospudener See has developed into a popular local recreation area. In recent years, it has been frequented by an average of around 450,000 people per season. In the course of the Leipzig Olympic application for 2012, competitions were held at Lake Cospuden. Rowing, triathlon and beach volleyball and a wide range of other leisure activities are planned. The lake offers the following uses:

=== North Shore Landscape Park ===
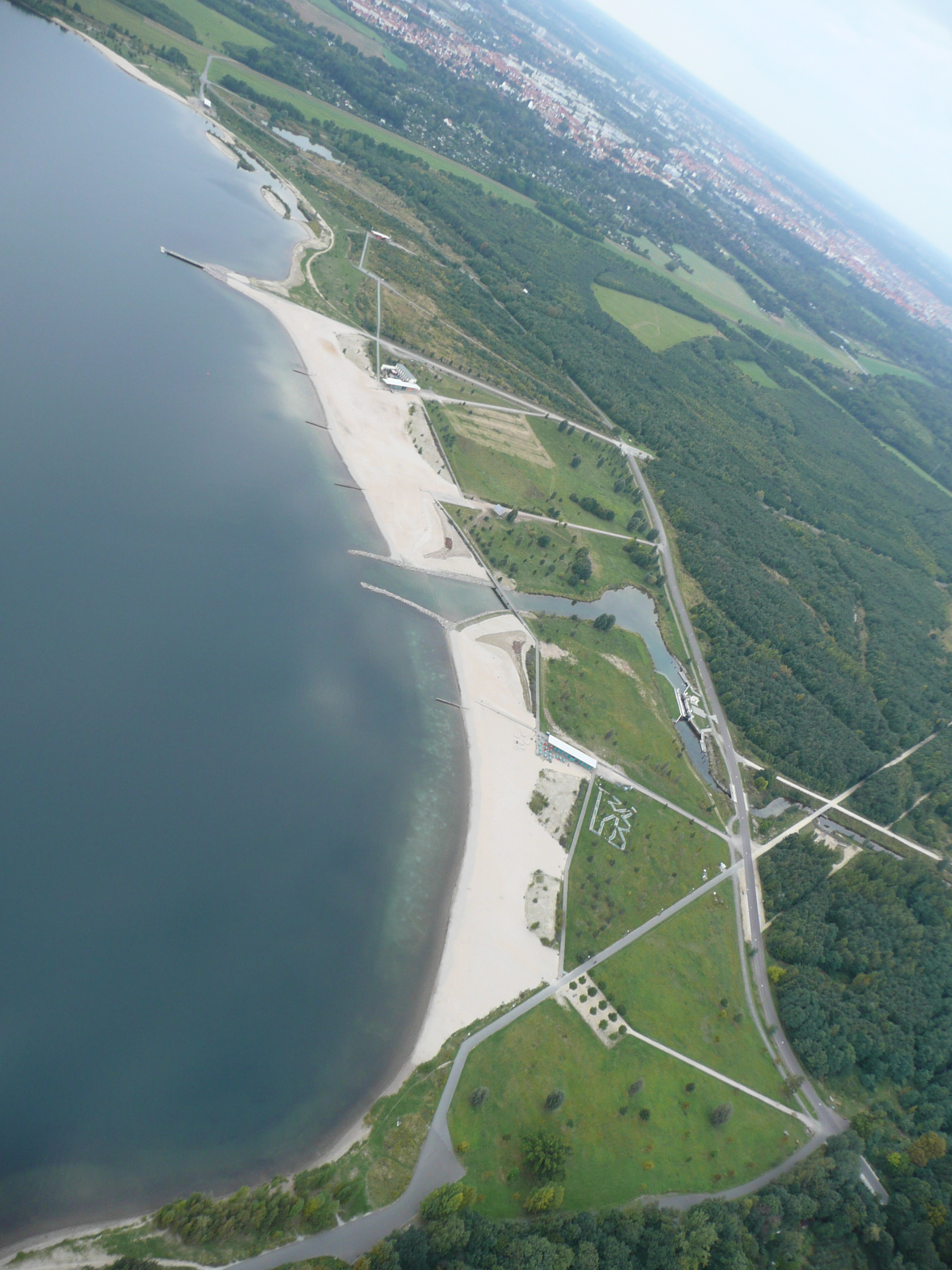
North shore

- Entrance building with an exhibition on the history of mining and the change in landscape in the south of Leipzig and with a bicycle rental station,
- 1.5 km (0.93 mi) long landscape and experience axis from the entrance building to the beach area,
- Tertiary forest (arboretum) consisting of plant communities and geological artefacts reminiscent of the time when lignite was formed
- water playground,
- 1 km (0.62 mi) long and 70 m (230 ft) wide beach with play and sunbathing areas,
- Beach pavilions with service stations (catering, changing rooms, sanitary facilities), pier for boat trips,
- event stage,
- miniature golf course.

Since 2010, the Th!nk? Festival for Techno and House music is held every year on the last Sunday of July.

=== Zöbigker Winkel (East Bank) ===
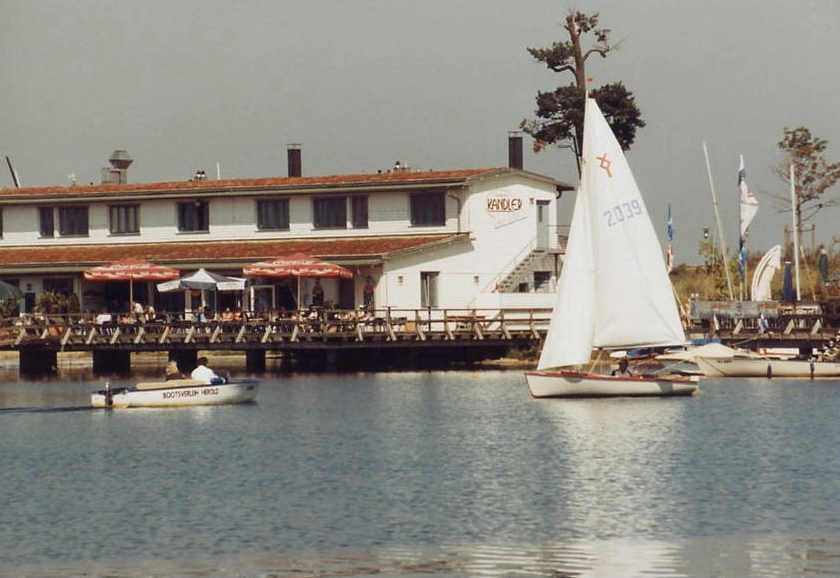
Water sports center Zöbigker Winkel

- Water sports center Pier I (paddling, rowing, surfing, sailing, kite surfing, diving school, boat rental etc.)
- 100 m (330 ft) long marina with three piers and berths for about 200 boats, pier for boat trips,
- three large harbor houses with service stations, gastronomy with lake terrace, retail trade, sauna with lake access, sanitary facilities, holiday apartments,
- gastronomic establishment at the Ostuferweg with restaurant, beach café and beach bar
- nine-hole golf course
- dive trail with natural and artificial underwater attractions (e.g. underwater forest, boat wreck, parking meter, conveyor belts).

=== Bistumshöhe (South Bank) ===
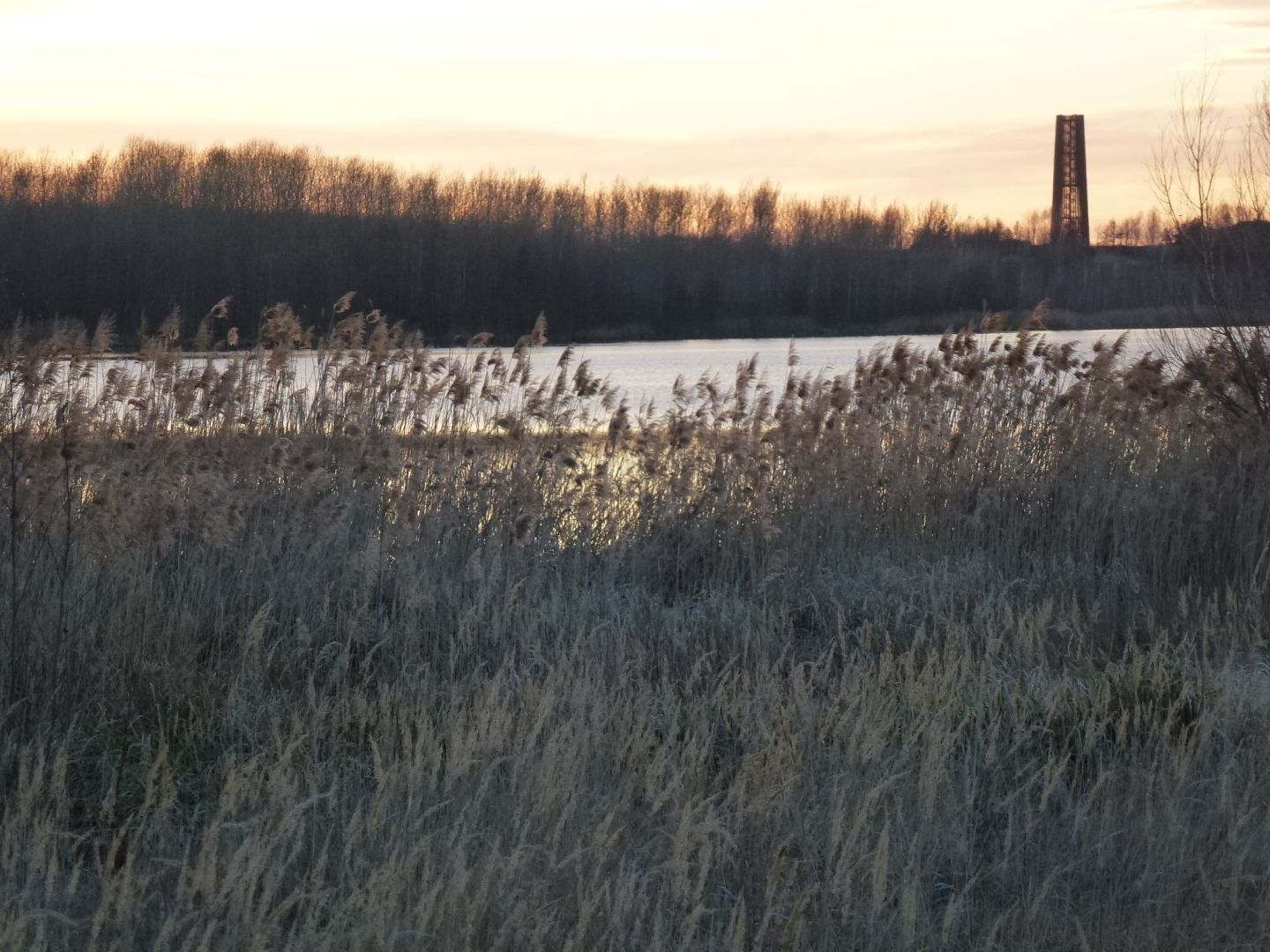
South bank with observation tower

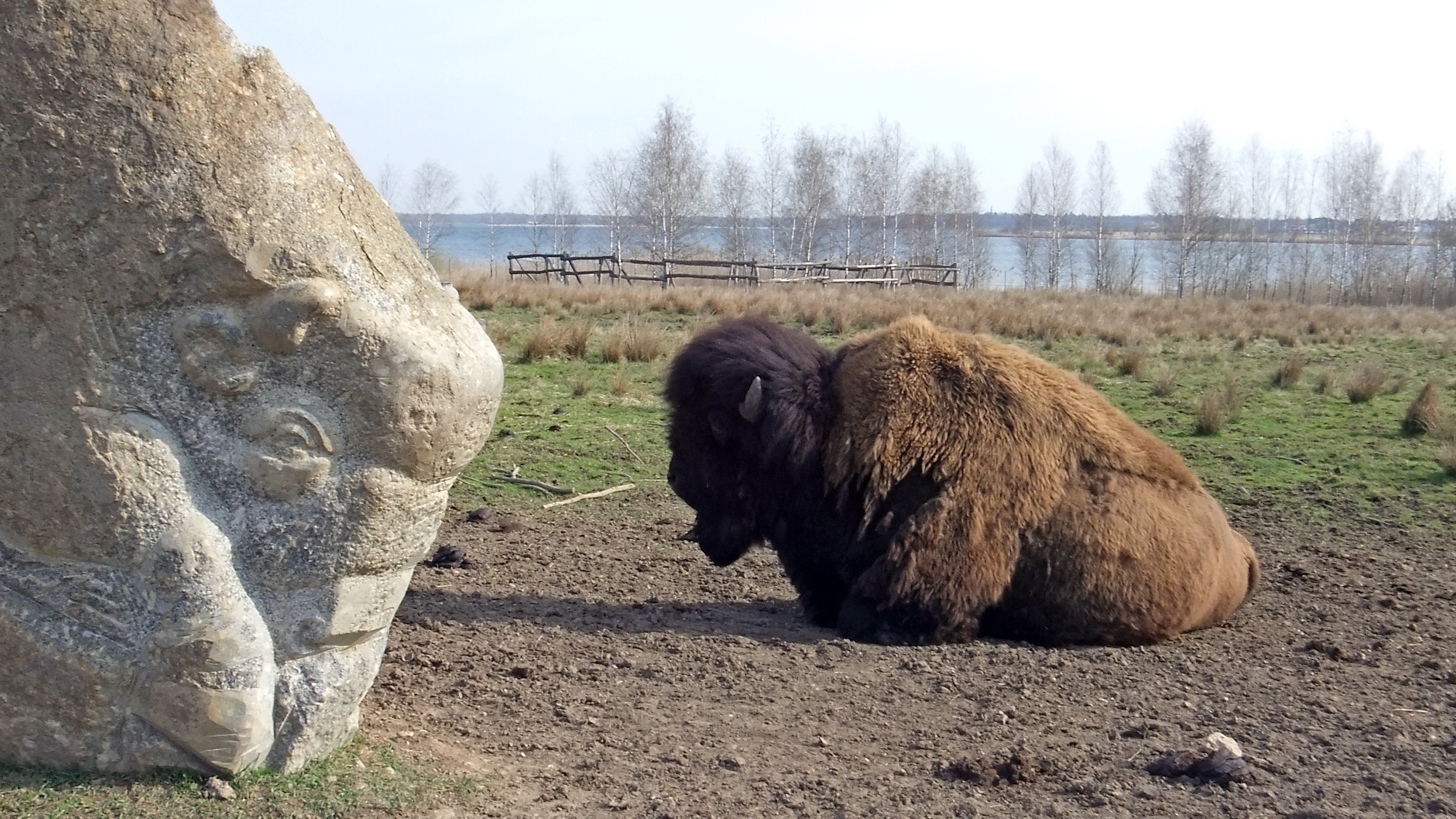
Wood bison at the Bistumshöhe

- Observation tower (35 m (115 ft), 180 steps) on an artificial hill (135 m (443 ft) above sea level), view over the lake, the Belantis amusement park and the towers of Leipzig
- Herds of wood bison and sika deer graze in an enclosure on the shore.

=== West Bank ===
- Priority and reservation area for nature and landscape protection
- Minimum ecological network between the landscape protection areas of Leipzig Riverside Forest in the north and the White Elster floodplain (Elsteraue) in the south.

=== Miscellaneous ===
- an island mailbox,
- two islands with shipwreck,
- 10.6 km (6.6 mi) long circular trail (completely paved bike and skater trail) around the lake with connecting trails, e.g. to Markkleeberg, Belantis, Kulkwitzer See, the Leipzig boroughs of Grünau, Großzschocher and Schleußig, to the southern floodplain forest and to the agra park in Markkleeberg
- Boat tours with the MS Cospuden and the solar boat Solaria 1
- Two covered self-drive rafts with BBQ,
- Covered pedal cars equipped with transparent rain tarpaulins for families and especially people with walking difficulties, which are offered for rent
- Diverse events (outdoor cinema, dragon boat races, long-distance swimming, concerts by the lake, readings, recitals, changing exhibitions, etc.)

== Watercourses ==
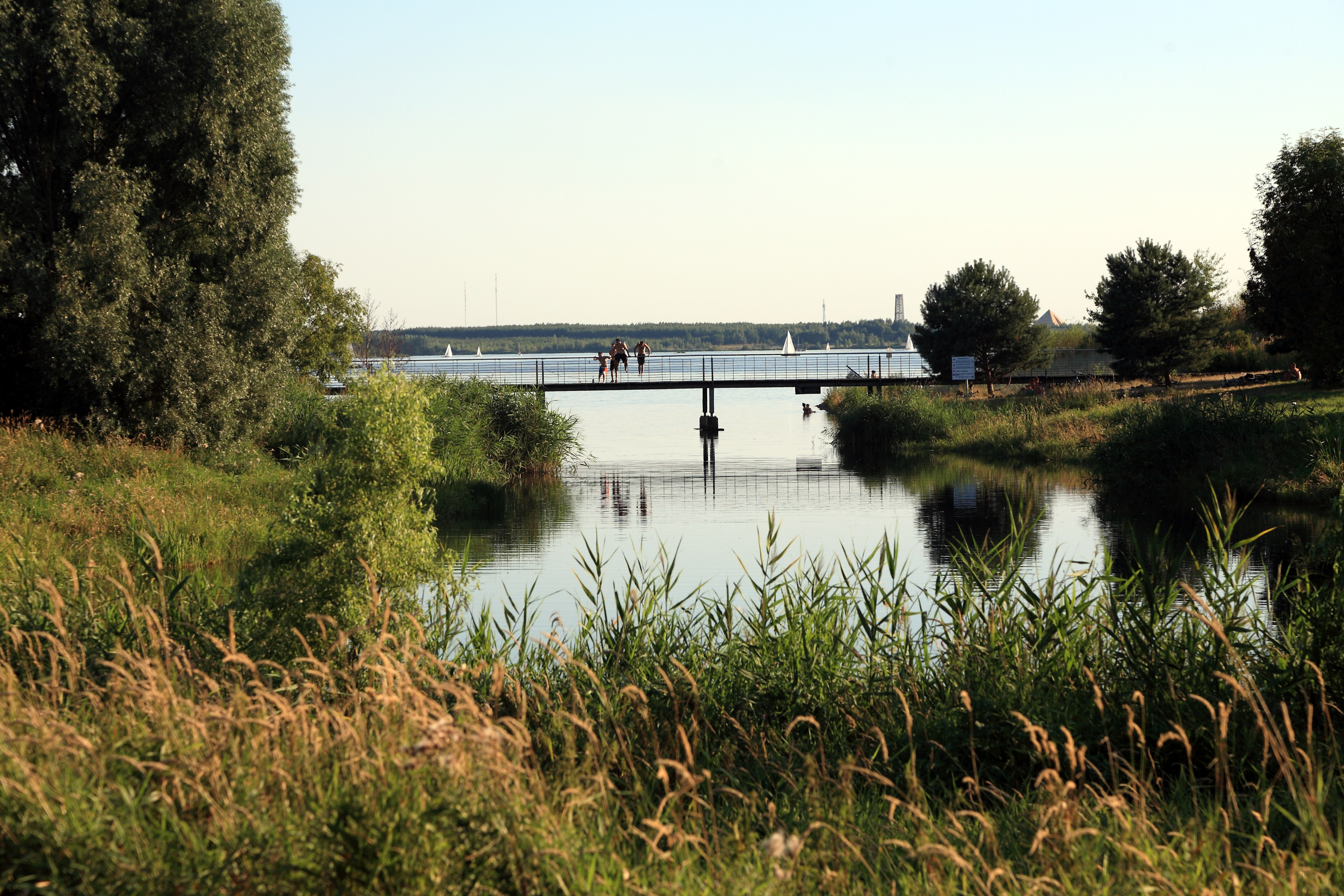
Channel to the forest lake Lauer

A newly created canal connects the northern part of the lake navigable (small boats) via the Waldsee Lauer (Forest lake Lauer) and via the Batschke (today mostly a raft ditch) through the forests of the Elster-Pleiße-Floodplain with the Pleiße and also via the lock at the Connewitz weir with the White Elster. The Zwenkauer See is also to be connected to the Cospudener See via the Neue Harth canal, which, according to press reports, is "stuck in planning and financing issues" in 2022. Both projects are considered the first steps towards the implementation of a water network between the lakes in the Leipzig Neuseenland.

As part of this network, a large part of the flooded opencast mines are to be connected to each other and to the city of Leipzig via the watercourse. This artificially connected lake district, which can be used for water tourism, would have better development and marketing opportunities than a series of unconnected individual lakes due to the synergy effects resulting from the linking of urban landscape, alluvial forests and open-cast mining lakes. Due to the high investments, which are estimated at 30-35 million euros, the participation of private investors and the finding of reliable sponsorship and operator models for the implementation of the plans will be decisive for success. The Cospudener See is part of the 2015 submitted Tourismuswirtschaftlichen Gesamtkonzeptes für die Gewässerlandschaft im mitteldeutschen Raum, which means in English Overall Tourism Concept for the Water landscape in Central Germany.

== Specifics ==
It is possible to marry on the ship The MS Neuseenland, a Hamburg harbor barge, has been operating as a charter ship on the lake since 2003.

== Traffic ==
There is a large, free visitor car park on Brückenstraße, which is 1 km (0.62 mi) from the north beach. In addition, Leipzig bus line 65 runs from there directly to the north beach, which connects the Leipzig borough Großzschocher in the northwest and the Markkleeberg S-Bahn station in the southeast. Cospudener See is part of the tariff zone 110 (City of Leipzig) from the direction of Großzschocher. In the summer months, from May to September, this area can also be reached on weekends with the extended Leipzig bus line 79 (Thekla-Stötteritz-Probstheida-Cospudener See).

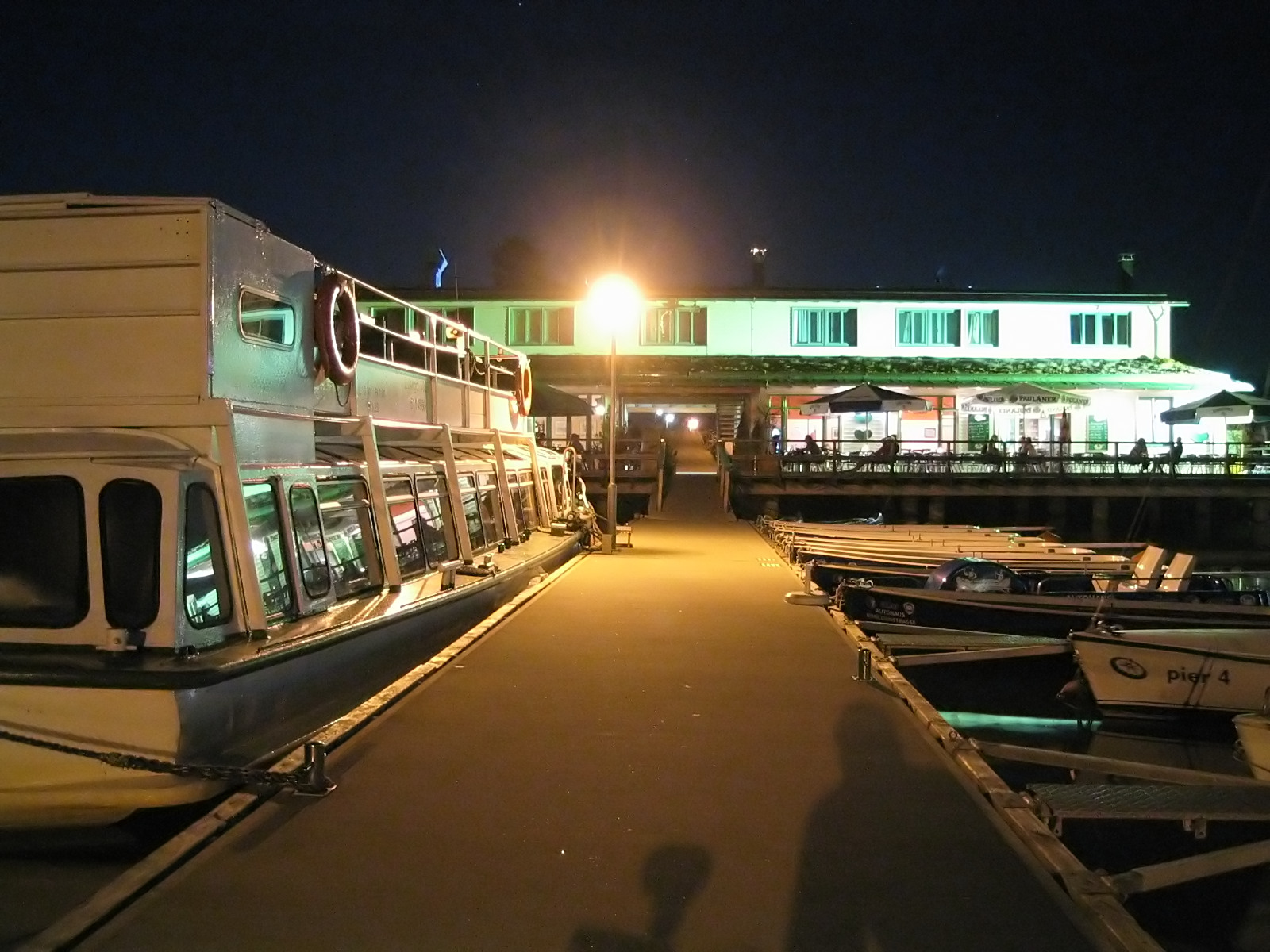
MS Cospuden at Pier I in Markkleeberg

In Zöbigker on the east bank, there are two more parking spaces: the first is 500 m (1,600 ft) from Pier I, the second is directly at the harbor pier and is intended for boat owners and people with walking disabilities. Also in Zöbigker the Leipzig bus line 106 (Probstheida/Auenhain-Markkleeberger See-Markkleeberg-Großstädteln) stops less than 300 m (980 ft) from the beach.

The lake is also connected to the Leipzig river and canal network by a lock in the northern area. This makes it possible to drive from Leipzig City Harbour to the lake. Not only smaller sailing ships can dock in the harbor, but there is also a pleasure boat from Pier I. The ship MS Cospuden operated by Tourismus- und Freizeitservice GmbH has been sailing on the lake since 25 March 2000. It has an upper and a lower deck. A trip with a lecture including the sailors' superstitions takes about an hour.

== Gallery ==
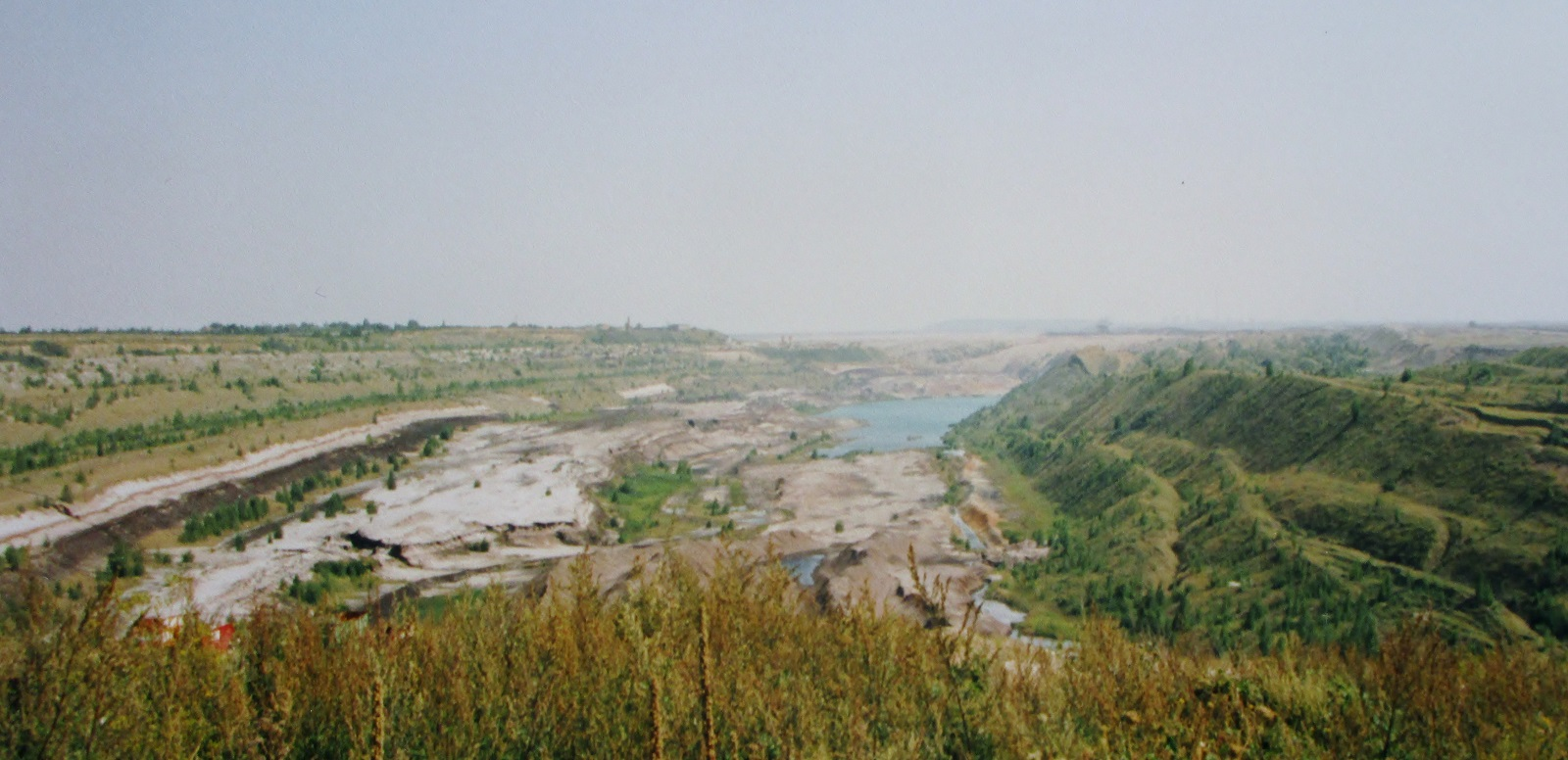
Open pit lignite mine Cospuden in July 1993, today: Lake Cospuden. (Viewing direction southwards)

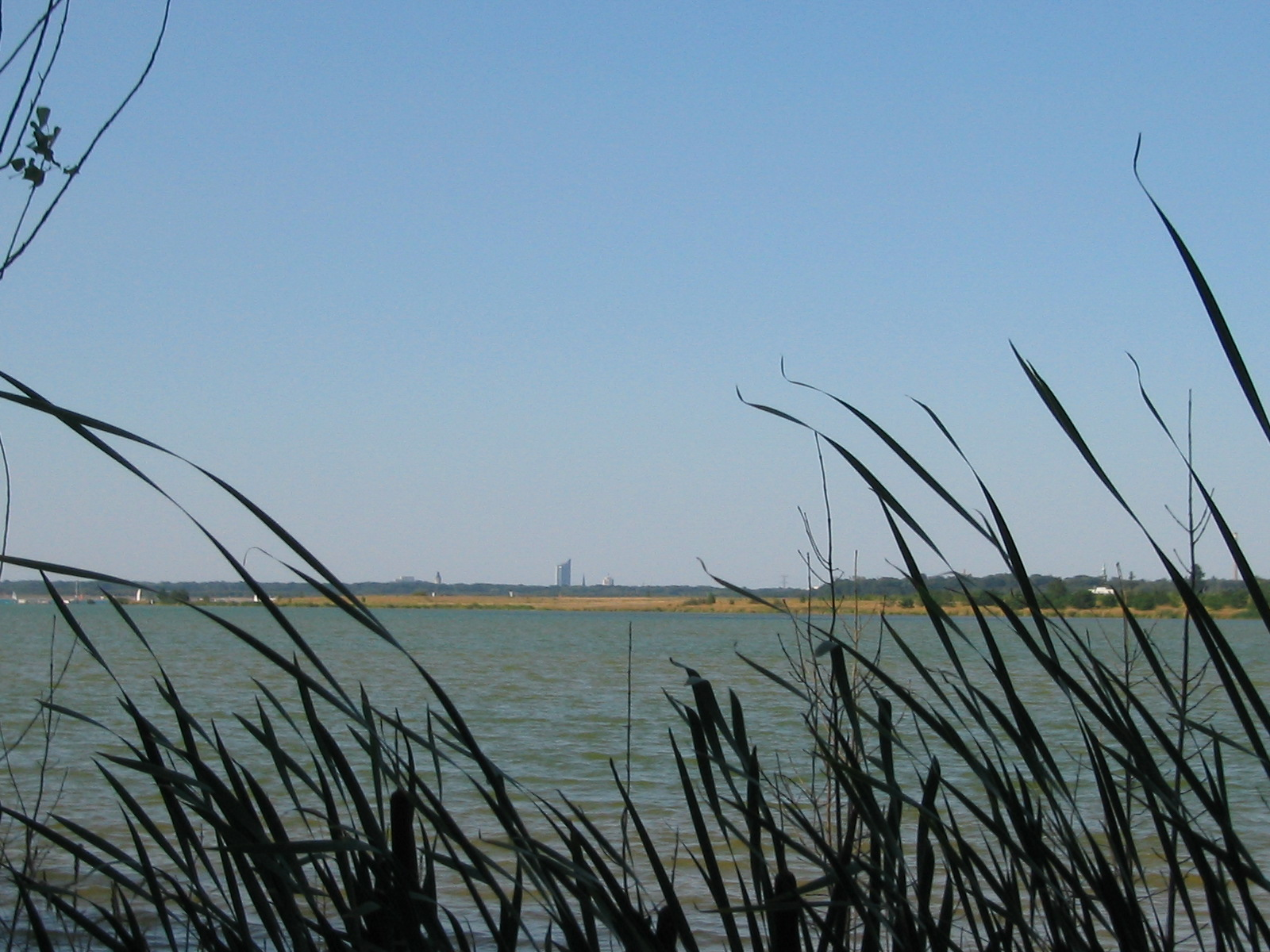
Lake Cospuden today. Viewing direction northwards with the towers of Leipzig in the background

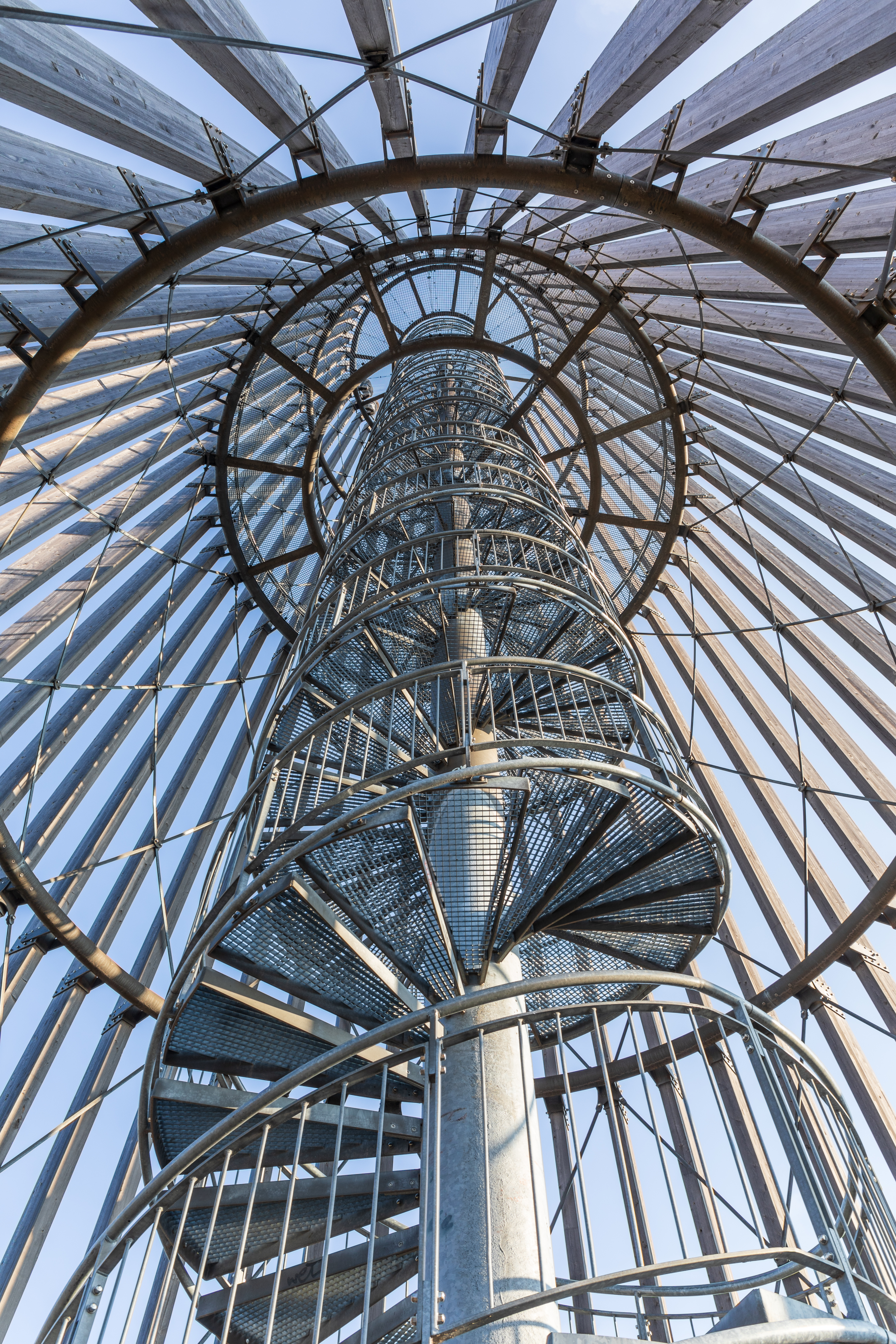
Inside the observation tower Bistumshöhe (2019)

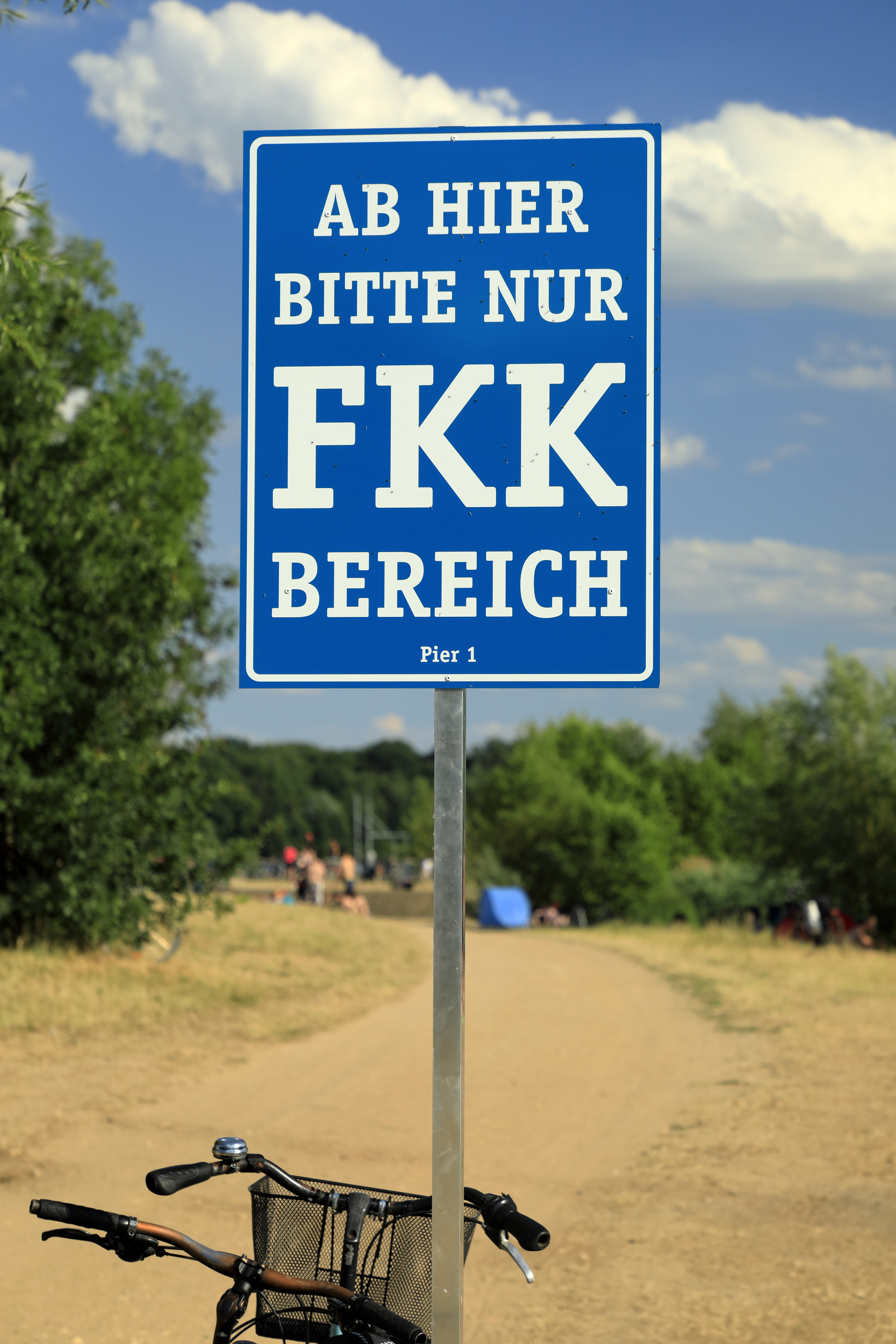
Signpost: From here public nude bathing only (FKK)

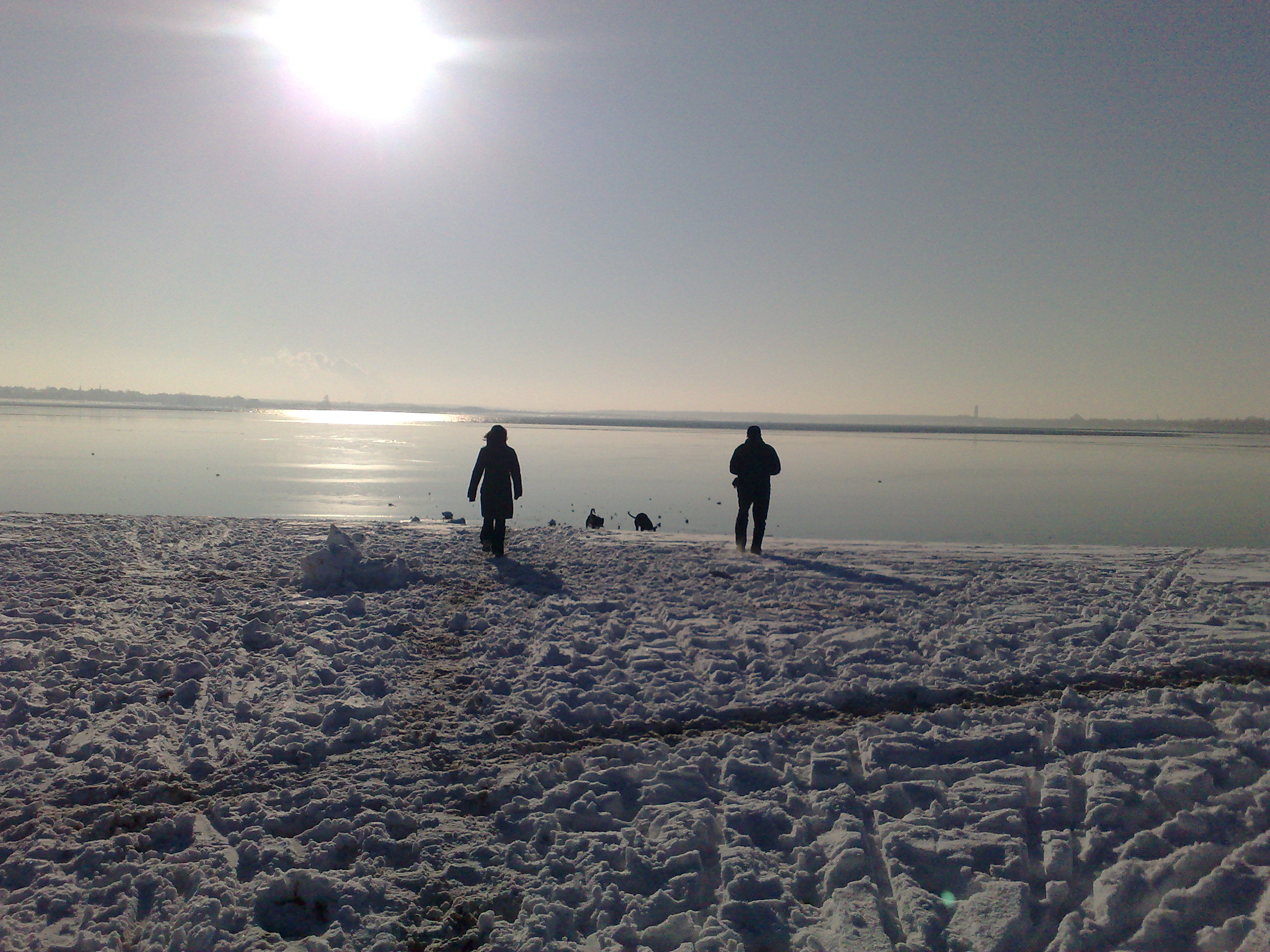
Cospudener See in winter

== Honours ==
In 2003, the project Leipzig. A Second Nature Landscape Cospuden was on the shortlist of the European Union Prize for Contemporary Architecture - Mies van der Rohe Award.

== See also ==
- Central German Lake District
- Bodies of water in Leipzig

== Literature ==
- Christliches Umweltseminar Rötha e. V. (Ed.): Den Wandel zeigen – den Wandel erleben: Cospuden. Südraum Journal Bd. 12. Leipzig 2000/2001
- Lausitzer und Mitteldeutsche Bergbauverwaltungsgesellschaft (Ed.): Schaffung von Tagebaurestseen im mitteldeutschen Bergbaurevier. Berlin 1999
- Lutz Schiffer et al. (Ed.): Bergbaurestseen in Mitteldeutschland. Seenkompass. Chemnitz/Espenhain 2002
- Mudroch / Stottmeister / Kennedy / Klapper (Eds.), Remediation of Abandoned Surface Coal Mining Sites, Springer Verlag Berlin / Heidelberg / New York 2002, ISBN 978-3-642-0741-1
- Lothar Eißmann, Armin Rudolph: Metamorphose einer Landschaft – Die aufgehenden Seen um Markkleeberg Sax, 2002, ISBN 978-3-934544-27-7
- Horst Riedel, Stadtlexikon Leipzig von A bis Z, Pro Leipzig Verlag, Leipzig 2005, ISBN 978-3-936508-03-1, p. 96
- Andreas Berkner, Grüne Wende. Leipzig im Zentrum der "Neuen Wasserlandschaft Mitteldeutschlands, in: Der Leipzig Atlas ed. by Helga Schmidt / Gudrun Mayer / Dorothea Wiktorin, Herman-Josef Emons Verlag, 2005, ISBN 978-3-89705-269-7, pp. 142–143
- Angela Zabojnik, Grüne Wende. Wassertouristische Traditionen und Visionen, in: Der Leipzig Atlas ed. by Helga Schmidt / Gudrun Mayer / Dorothea Wiktorin, Herman-Josef Emons Verlag, 2005, ISBN 978-3-89705-269-7, pp. 144–145
- Rebecca Heinze, Cospudener See. Windjammer und Surfmanöver vor Leipzigs Toren, in: Leipziger Blätter Sonderheft Mitteldeutsche Seenlandschaft, Leipzig 2007, ISBN 978-3-938543-35-1, pp. 24–28
- Geschichte der Stadt Leipzig, Band 4, Vom Ersten Weltkrieg bis zur Gegenwart, ed. by Ulrich von Hehl, Leipziger Universitätsverlag, Leipzig 2019, ISBN 978-3-86583-804-9, pp. 882f., 901–903, 944
