= Hainer =

Hainer is a surname. Notable people with the surname include:

- Bayard T. Hainer (1860–1933), American judge from Oklahoma
- Eugene J. Hainer (1851–1929), American politician from Nebraska
- Herbert Hainer (born 1954), German business manager

== See also ==
- Hainer See, a lake in Germany
- Haines (surname)
