= Central German Lake District =

Collection of artificial lakes in Germany created through lignite mining

The Central German Lake District (German: Mitteldeutsches Seenland) is a group of artificial lakes that are the result of extensive open pit lignite mining. The area around Leipzig is sometimes separately marketed as the "Leipzig Lake District" (German: Leipziger Seenland) or the Neuseenland. The Lausitzer und Mitteldeutsche Bergbauverwaltungsgesellschaft is in charge of the technological side of the area.

== List of lakes ==
Name (and Location)	(Planned) final size in hectares	Flooding	Use
Bockwitzer See (51.13186°N 12.54638°E)	168	1995–2004	Primarily a nature reserve
Cospudener See (51.269444°N 12.33527°E)	436	1993–2000	Beaches, water sports, recreation
Geiseltalsee (51.30796°N 11.88536°E)	1842	2003–2011	Bathing, water sports, recreation
Grabschützer See (51.480278°N 12.281944°E)	130	1997–2022	
Gremminer See (51.7513°N 12.4503°E)	541	2002–2012	Ferropolis - museum and event location
Gröberner See (51.7043°N 12.4496°E)	374	2003–2013	Water sports, gastronomy, RV campsites, resorts
Großer Goitzschesee (51.6140°N 12.3763°E)	1331	1999–2002	Water sports, leisure, landscape art
Großkaynaer See (51.2805°N 11.9404°E)	255	1996–2012	
Großstolpener See (51.1387°N 12.3349°E)	28	1992–1998	Lido and gastronomy
Hainer See (51.1688°N 12.4598°E)	560	1999–2010	Water sports and leisure (planned)
Harthsee (51.0861°N 12.5482°E)	88	1985–1996	Bathing, gastronomy, campsite
Haselbacher See (51.0834°N 12.3985°E)	334	1993–2002	Water sports, bathing
Haubitzer See (51.1620°N 12.4878°E)	158	1999–2006	Water sports and leisure (planned)
Holzweißiger See (51.5960°N 12.3303°E)	47	2005–2006	Water sports, bathing
Kahnsdorfer See (51.1761°N 12.4274°E)	121	1999–2018	Nature reserve
Kulkwitzer See (51.3093°N 12.2480°E)	170	1963–1973	Water sports and leisure
Ludwigsee (51.5806°N 12.3165°E)	86	1993–2007	Bathing, Nature
Markkleeberger See (51.2655°N 12.4071°E)	249	1993–2005	Water sports and leisure
Muldestausee (51.6398°N 12.4085°E)	630	1975–1976	Nature, leisure, recreation, Water sports
Neuhäuser See (51.5666°N 12.3314°E)	155	1998–2006	Nature
Pahnaer See (51.0482°N 12.4973°E)	26	1955–1970	Lido, gastronomy, campsite
Paupitzscher See (51.5821°N 12.3486°E)	80	1993–2006	Fauna-Flora-Habitat of European relevance
Pereser See (51.1290°N 12.3847°E)	589	2045–2051	Watersports (planned)
Raßnitzer See (51.3780°N 12.0987°E)	315	1998–2002	Largely nature reserve
Runstädter See (51.3000°N 11.9356°E)	233	2001–2003	
Schladitzer See (51.4385°N 12.3356°E)	220	1999–2012	Water sports and leisure
Seelhausener See (51.5842°N 12.4223°E)	634	2000–2002	Bathing, water sports(planned)
Speicherbecken Borna (51.1105°N 12.4514°E)	265	1964–1980	Flood protection, fish breeding, nature reserves, beaches
Störmthaler See (51.2342°N 12.4514°E)	733	2003–2012	Water sports, nature reserves, art (planned)
Wallendorfer See (51.3757°N 12.0601°E)	338	1998–2004	Leisure, nature reserve
Werbeliner See (51.4785°N 12.3093°E)	443	1998–2010	Bird protection area
Werbener See (51.1952°N 12.2368°E)	79	1998–2000	Bathing, fishing, diving
Zwenkauer See (51.2366°N 12.3079°E)	970	2006–2015	leisure, nature reserve, flood protection (planned)

== See also ==
- Leipzig River Network
- Lusatian Lake District - of similar origins
