= Schladitzer See =

Lake in Germany

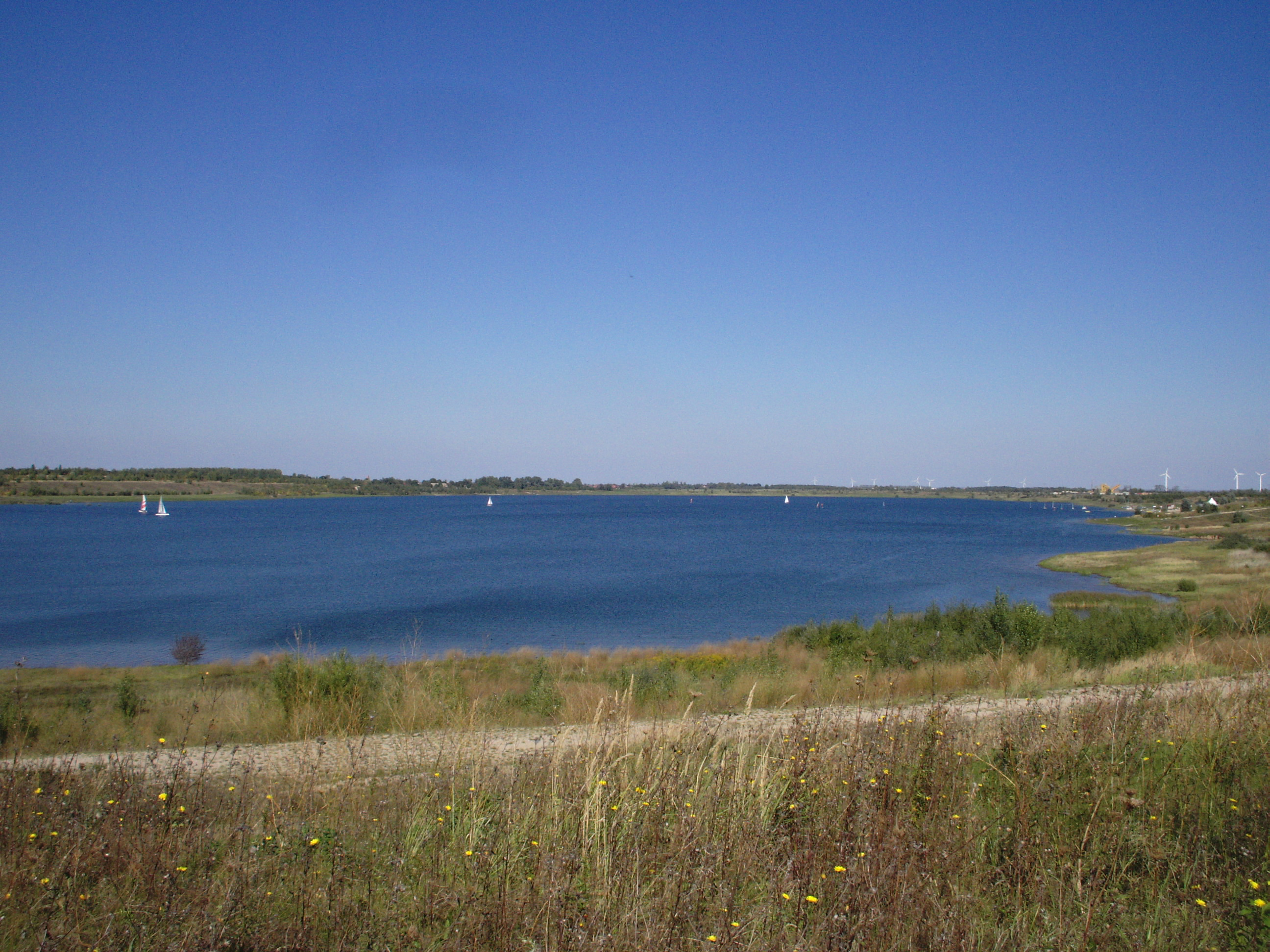
- Schladitzer See (2007)

- Location within Saxony
- Location: Landkreis Nordsachsen, Saxony
- Coordinates: 51°26′25″N 12°20′17″E
- Basin countries: Germany
- Surface area: 2.18 km^{2} (0.84 sq mi)
- Average depth: 12 m (39 ft)
- Max. depth: 22 m (72 ft)
- Water volume: 25,000,000 m^{3} (880,000,000 cu ft)
- Shore length^{1}: 6.5 km (4.0 mi)
- Surface elevation: 104 m (341 ft)
- ^{1} Shore length is not a well-defined measure.

Schladitzer See (in English: Lake Schladitz) is an artificial lake in Landkreis Nordsachsen, Saxony, Germany. At an elevation of 104 m (341 ft), its surface area is 2.18 km². The lake is a part of the Central German Lake District. It was gradually filled from 1999 to 2012.

== Genesis ==
The lake was developed from the former Breitenfeld opencast lignite mine where coal mining began in 1986. In 1986, the locality of Lössen fell victim to the development. From 1989 to 1991, the municipality of Schladitz, after which the lake is named, was cleared and demolished. This also affected the Schladitz locality of Kömmlitz.

After 1990, sales of raw lignite and lignite products deteriorated so much that various opencast mines, which were now unprofitable, were shut down. The former municipality of Schladitz remained unaffected by the mining. Plans that envisaged an expansion of the Breitenfeld opencast mine to the northern outskirts of Leipzig and the relocation of the Bundesautobahn 14 were no longer implemented.

== Usage ==
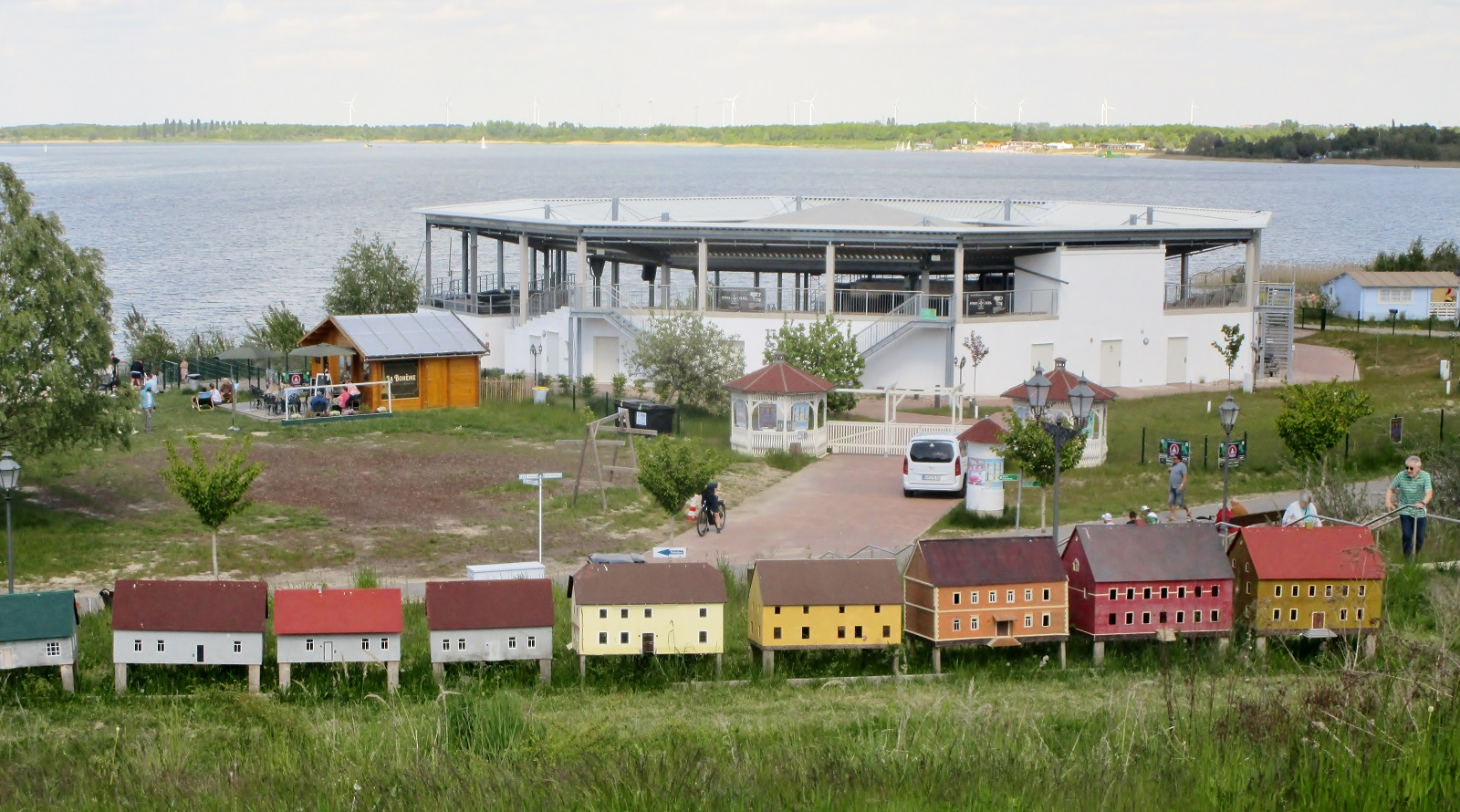
Lake stage at Schladitzer See (2025)

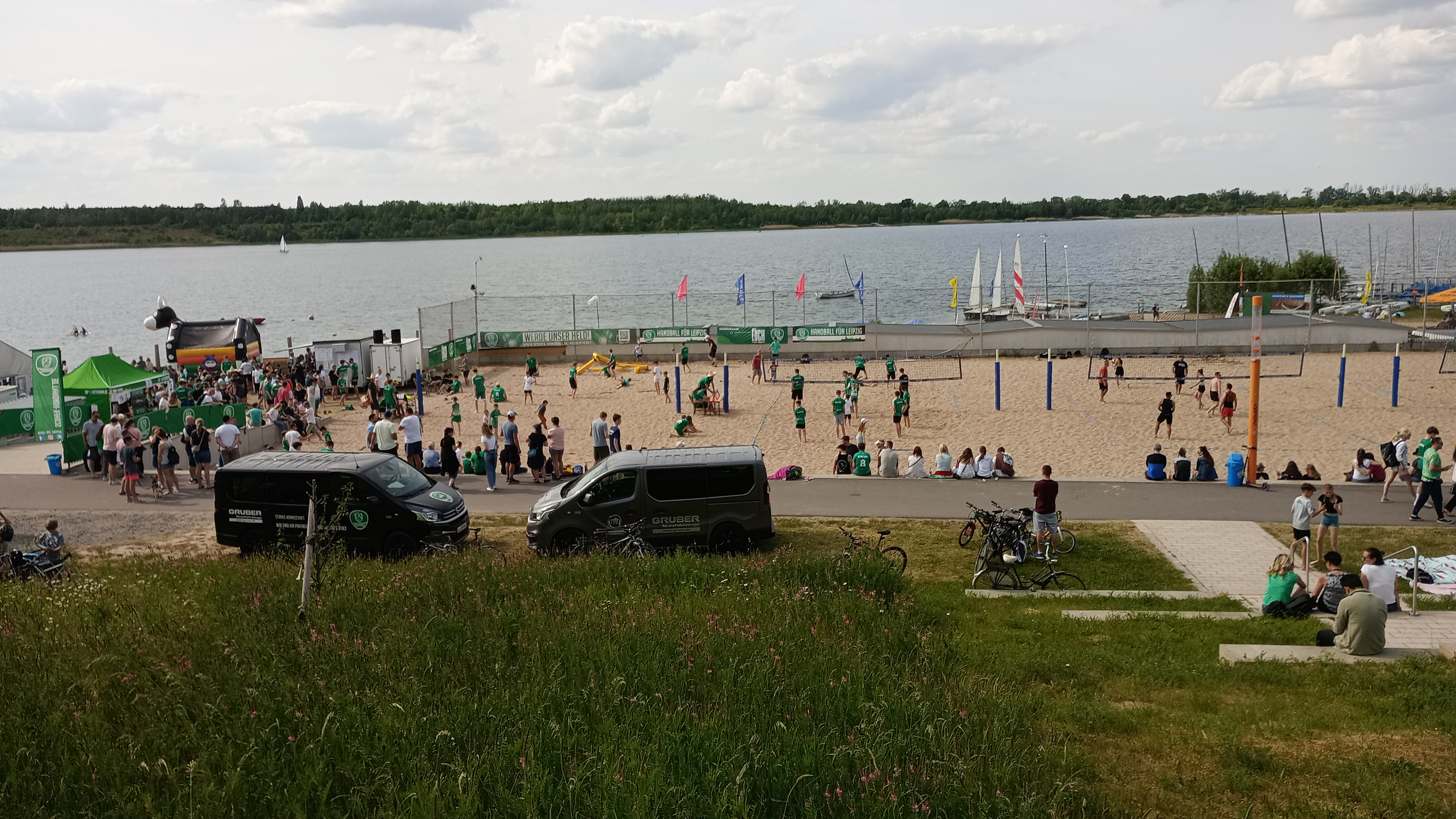
Beach volleyball facility at Schladitzer See in 2023

The Schladitzer See has been used as a bathing lake and water sports center since 2003. Bathing has been permitted in two bathing areas since 2003, after the embankment was strengthened. The use of the lake began years before the planned final water level of 104 m (341 ft) above sea level was reached.

The Wolteritz bathing beach on the Wolteritz side of the lake (the northwest side) was set up as a bathing area for the local population due to its close proximity to the Wolteritz area according to the principle of "guidance for visitors instead of prohibition signs".

Since August 2003 there are four volleyball courts suitable for tournaments at Schladitzer Bucht (Schladitz Bay) on the Schladitz side of the lake (the southeast side). Since then, beach volleyball, beach handball and beach soccer tournaments are held regularly during the season. Among other things, the qualification for the German championships in beach volleyball, the „Sachsenmasters“, is held here. The Schladitz Bay was managed by a water sports school from June 2003 and from 2013 it was expanded into a sports resort with water sports offers and courses, accommodation and camping.

The Haynaer Strandverein e.V. association manages the part of the shore including Biedermeier beach. The music and theater club from the Krostitz locality Priester is a frequent guest. Various concerts and plays are held annually on the Hayna Lake Stage. Restaurants are available on all three beaches.

Since 2005 there is an 8 km (5.0 mi) long, paved circular path that is used by skaters, cyclists and hikers. There are also connections to the Werbeliner See and to the 17 m (56 ft) tall wheel of the bucket-wheel excavator SR 6300 in Gerbisdorf.

== Traffic ==
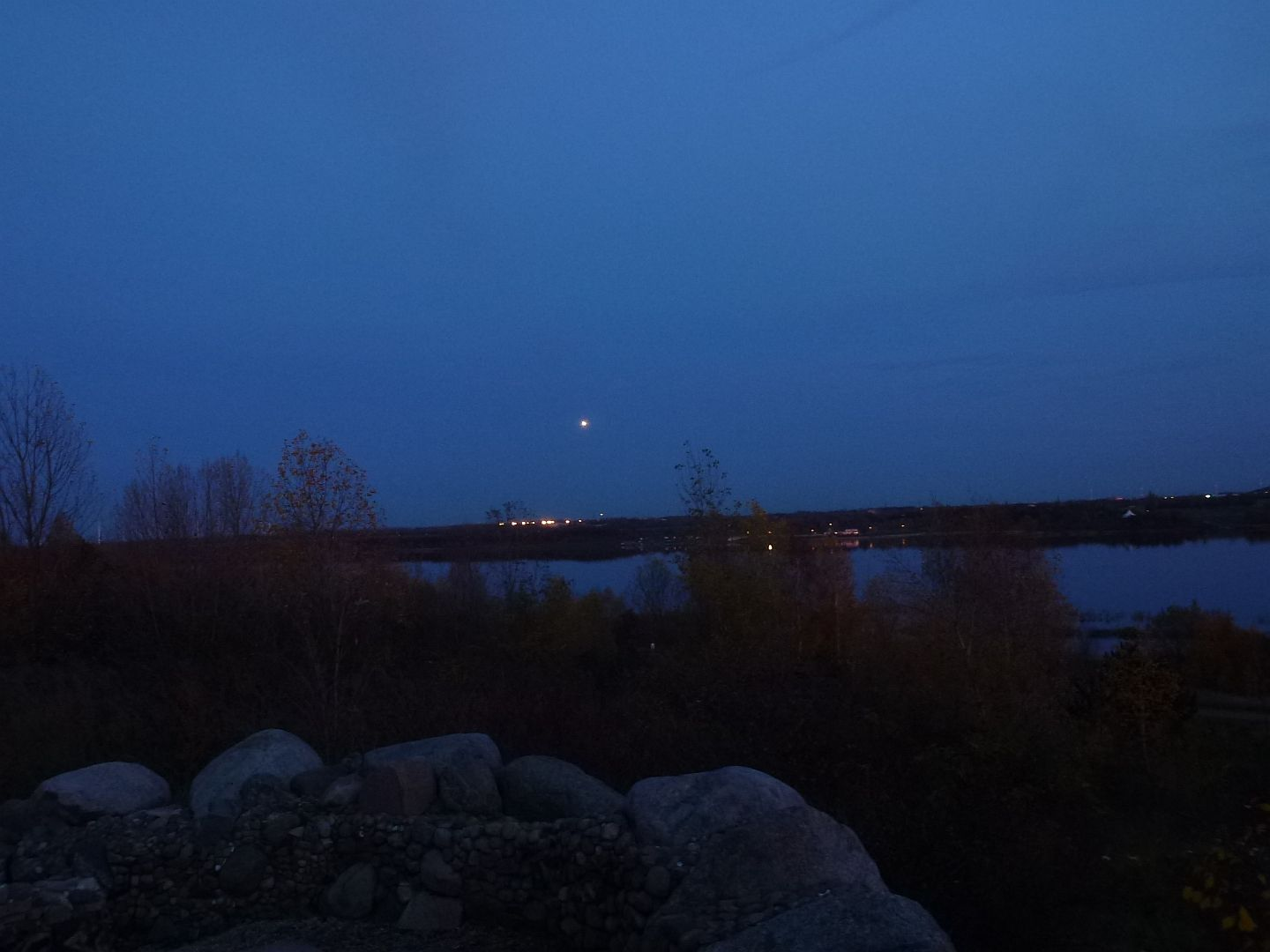
Airplane on approach

The Bundesautobahn 14 (exit ramps Leipzig-Nord or Leipzig-Mitte) as well as the Bundesstraße 2 and the Bundesstraße 184 connect Lake Schladitz to the national transport network. There was no public transport connection before 2022, when a driverless bus began to run between Schladitzer Bucht and Rackwitz S-Bahn station on the Leipzig-Bitterfeld railway line.

Due to a well-developed network of cycle paths, the lake is also very easy to reach by bike. The 160 km (99 mi) long cycle path from Wittenberg to Markkleeberg under the name Kohle-Dampf-Licht-Seen (coal-steam-light-lakes) leads along the lake.

The lake is about 4 km (2.5 mi) east of the northern runway at Leipzig/Halle Airport in the approach lane, so aircraft fly low over the southern part of the lake.
