= Großer Goitzschesee =

Artificial lake in Saxony-Anhalt, Germany

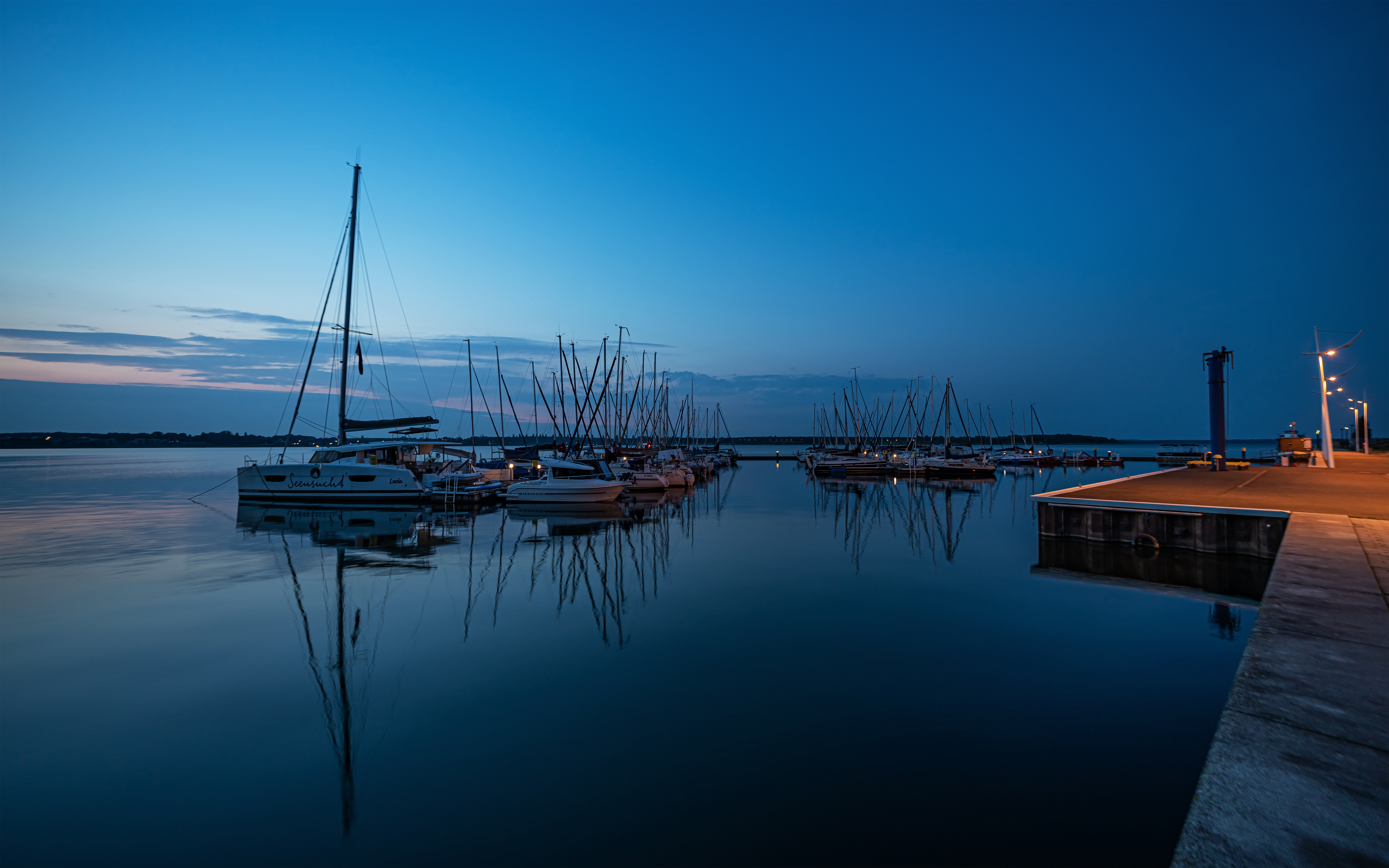
- Goitzschesee with marina
- Interactive map of Großer Goitzschesee
- Location: Landkreis Anhalt-Bitterfeld, Sachsen-Anhalt
- Coordinates: 51°37′35″N 12°21′49″E
- Primary outflows: Mulde
- Surface area: 13.32 km^{2} (5.14 sq mi)
- Max. depth: 48 m (157 ft)
- Water volume: 213,000,000 m^{3} (7.5×10^{9} cu ft)
- Surface elevation: 75 m (246 ft)
- Settlements: Bitterfeld

The Großer Goitzschesee is the largest lake in the Goitzsche lake district, which emerged from the former Goitzsche (pronounced: Gottsche) brown coal open-cast mine in Saxony-Anhalt. The opencast mine residue lake belongs to the Bitterfeld mining area. The northeastern bay near Mühlbeck is called Amber Lake.

Since the flooding of the Geiseltalsee was completely in 2011, the Großer Goitzschesee has been the second largest lake in the Central German Lake District.

== Etymology ==
The name of the alluvial forest originally located here has changed several times over the centuries until the name 'Goitzsche' became established.

== History ==
The lake is located southeast of Bitterfeld and north of Delitzsch and, together with the Mulde reservoir, encloses the village of Pouch. In 1998, flooding of the former opencast mining area began with the introduction of water from the Mulde river, with the project being completed in 2002: A break in the Mulden dam caused by the Mulde flood caused the water to fill by seven meters to well above the target level within two days, so that it overflowed and partially submerged the nearby town of Bitterfeld.

Although the opencast mine extended across Saxony-Anhalt and Saxony, today's Großer Goitzschesee is located only in Saxony-Anhalt. On the other hand, the neighboring Seelhausener See, located to the south, is located almost entirely in Saxony. It used to be a part of the Goitzsche opencast mine too.

== Uses ==
The Great Goitzschesee was rehabilitated by the Lausitz and Central German Mining Management Company (LMBV) by 2006. The Great Goitzschesee has become a popular local recreation area due to its diverse leisure options.

In June 2005, the lake was opened for water sports and tourist use, initially limited until December 31, 2005. Fishing is already permitted in some places with a fishing license. The lake is now open for general use.

The bank area from Bitterfeld's Fritz Heinrich Stadium to the water level tower has been completed since July 8, 2005 . An extensive waterfront area was created with a festival area, campsite, a harbor basin on Berliner Straße in Bitterfeld and two marinas. Various water sports such as sailing, diving, stand-up paddling and surfing are possible on the lake. The so-called Amber Promenade runs along the shore from the water tower to the Pouch peninsula.

The Großer Goitzschesee is well served by hiking and cycling paths. The coal-steam-light cycle path leads past the lake. The Goitzschesee circular path leads around the lake.

Large parts of the lake in the Bärenhof area were acquired by the BUND (Association for the Environment and Nature Conservation Germany) and are designated as a nature reserve.

Since 2004, motorboat races (world, European and German championships) have taken place on the Goitzsche near the Pouch peninsula in August. The event is connected to the region's largest folk festival, the Goitzsche Festival. Every year around 100,000 visitors flock to the peninsula on the second weekend in August.

In addition, the so-called Goitzsche Marathon has been held annually along the lake in various disciplines since 2006.

Since 2015, amber has been mined from the lake. It is the world's second largest amber deposit and the world's largest underwater mining area. Nine different types of amber are found in the lake.

== Surroundings ==
On the banks of the Großer Goitzschesee is one of the most representative buildings of historicism in the region. The villa on Lake Bernstein was built in 1896 in the Neo-Renaissance style by the manufacturer Biermann (thus the nickname Biermann's Villa). The building was not demolished because of the brown coal mining, but was empty for a few years after the political change and fell into disrepair. In 1999, Sparkasse Bitterfeld acquired the villa and had it renovated. The villa on Lake Bernstein is a listed building and is now used as a hotel and restaurant.

The 26 m high Goitzschesee water level tower stands directly next the lake and offers panoramic views of the surrounding towns.
