= Werbeliner See =

Lake in Germany

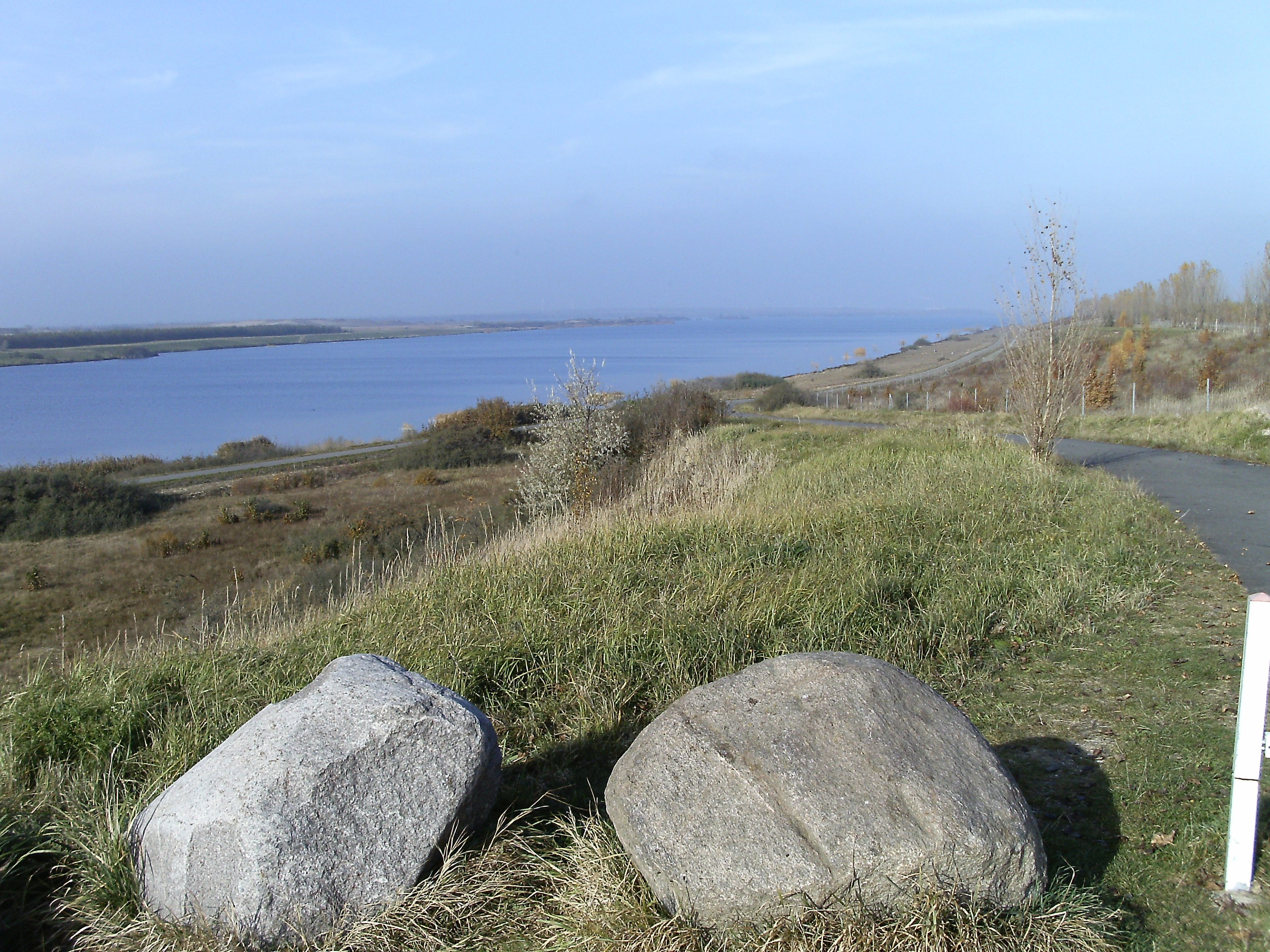

- Location within Saxony
- Location: Saxony
- Coordinates: 51°28′29.95″N 12°18′42.62″E
- Basin countries: Germany
- Surface area: 4.5 km^{2} (1.7 sq mi)
- Average depth: 9 m (30 ft)
- Max. depth: 32 m (105 ft)
- Water volume: 43,000,000 m^{3} (1.5×10^{9} cu ft)
- Shore length^{1}: 11.4 km (7.1 mi)
- Surface elevation: 98.0 m (321.5 ft)
- Settlements: Delitzsch
- ^{1} Shore length is not a well-defined measure.

Werbeliner See is a lake in Saxony, Germany. At an elevation of 98.0 m, its surface area is 4.5 km². The lake is a part of the Central German Lake District.
