= Haselbacher See =

Lake in Germany

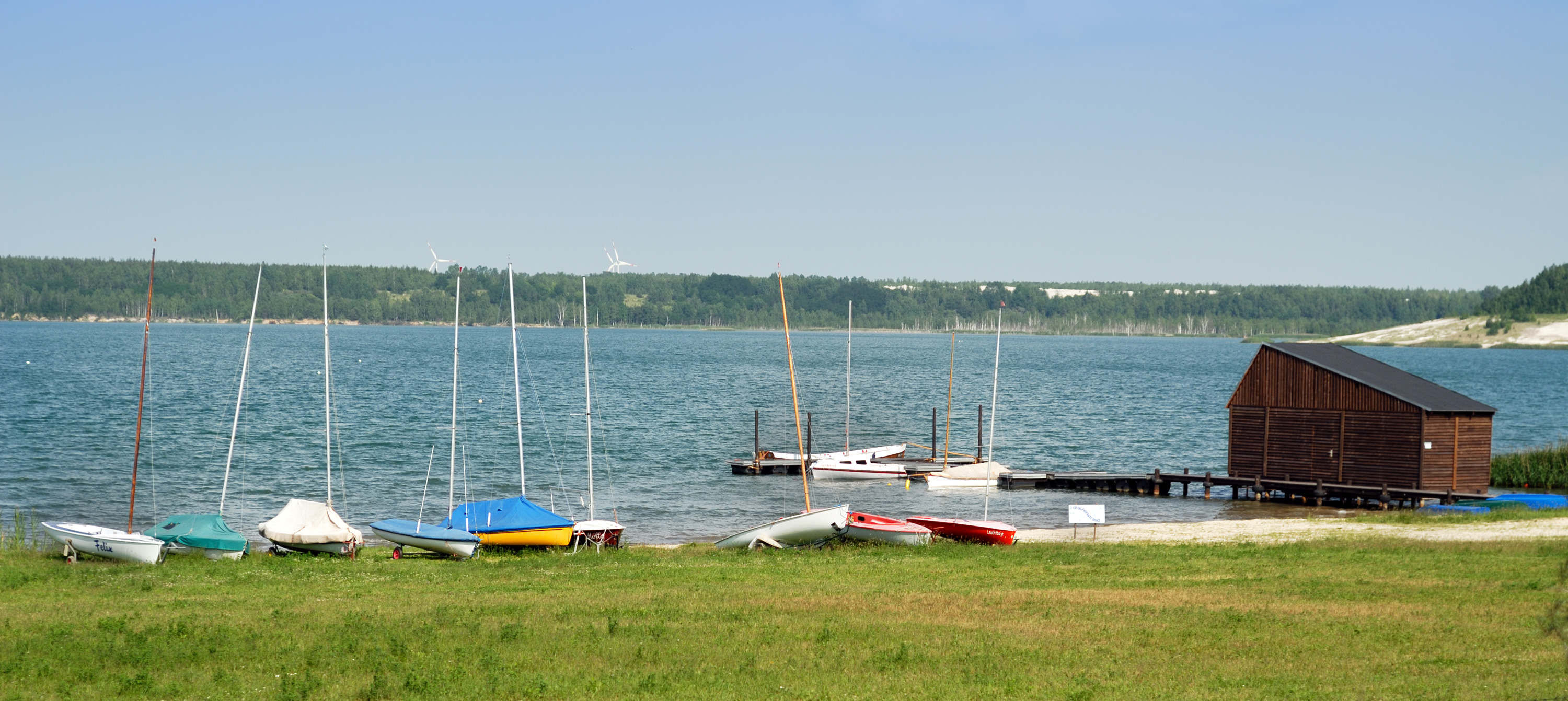

- Location within Saxony
- Location: Leipzig (Saxony)/ Altenburger Land (Thuringia)
- Coordinates: 51°5′2.83″N 12°23′51.88″E
- Basin countries: Germany
- Surface area: 3.35 km^{2} (1.29 sq mi)
- Average depth: 7.1 m (23 ft)
- Max. depth: 33 m (108 ft)
- Water volume: 23,800,000 m^{3} (840,000,000 cu ft)
- Shore length^{1}: 8.2 km (5.1 mi)
- Surface elevation: 151 m (495 ft)
- ^{1} Shore length is not a well-defined measure.

Haselbacher See is a lake in Leipzig (Saxony)/ Altenburger Land (Thuringia), Germany. At an elevation of 151 m, its surface area is 3.35 km^{2}. The lake is a part of the Central German Lake District.
