= Batschke =

River in Germany

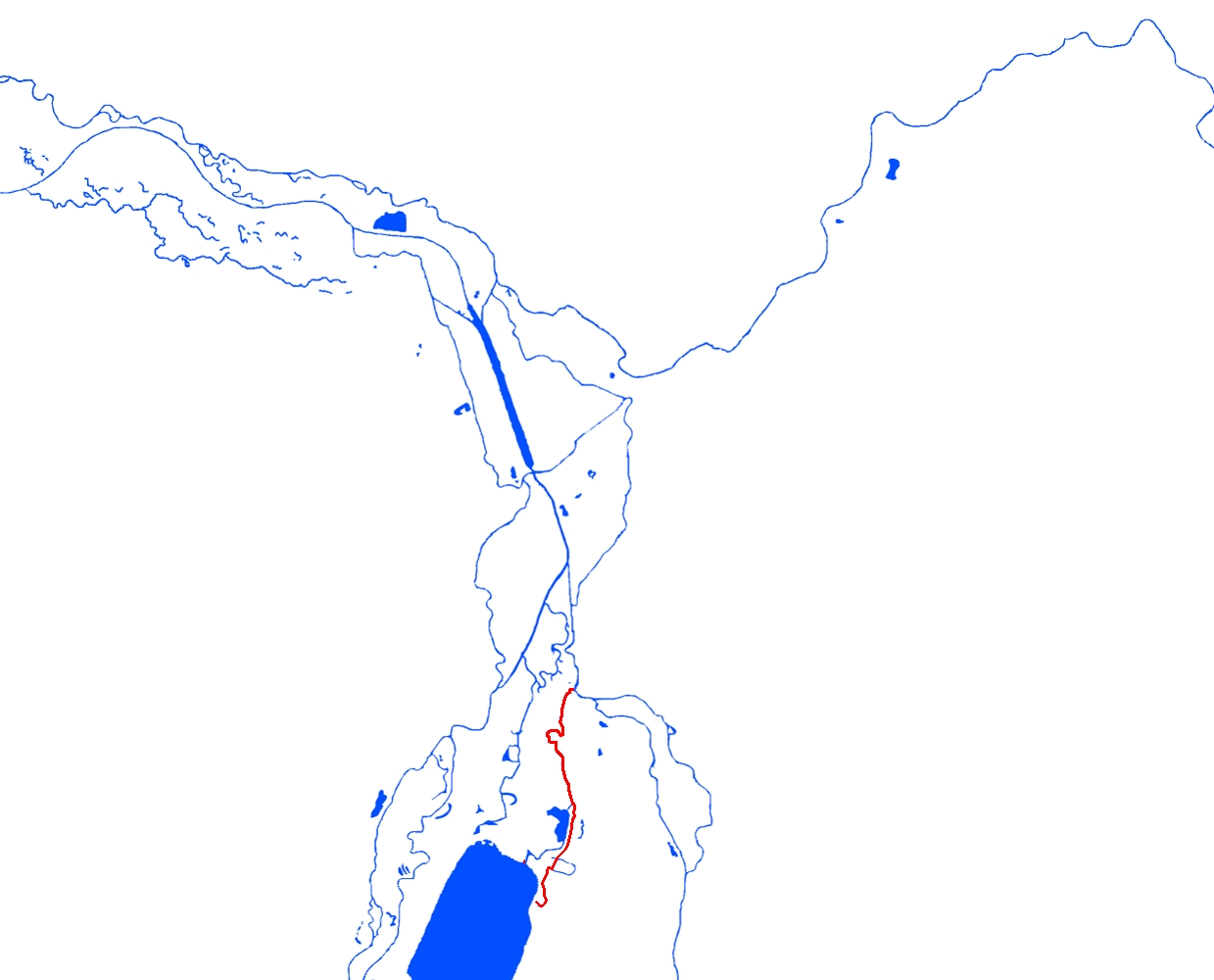

Location
- Country: Germany
- State: Saxony

Physical characteristics
- Mouth
  - location: Pleiße
  - coordinates: 51.3053°N 12.3583°E

Basin features
- Progression: Pleiße→ White Elster→ Saale→ Elbe→ North Sea

The Batschke, also Floßgraben, is a small river of Saxony, Germany. It flows into the Pleiße near Leipzig. Much of its course has been disrupted by lignite mining.

== See also ==
- List of rivers of Saxony
- Bodies of water in Leipzig
