= Zwenkauer See =

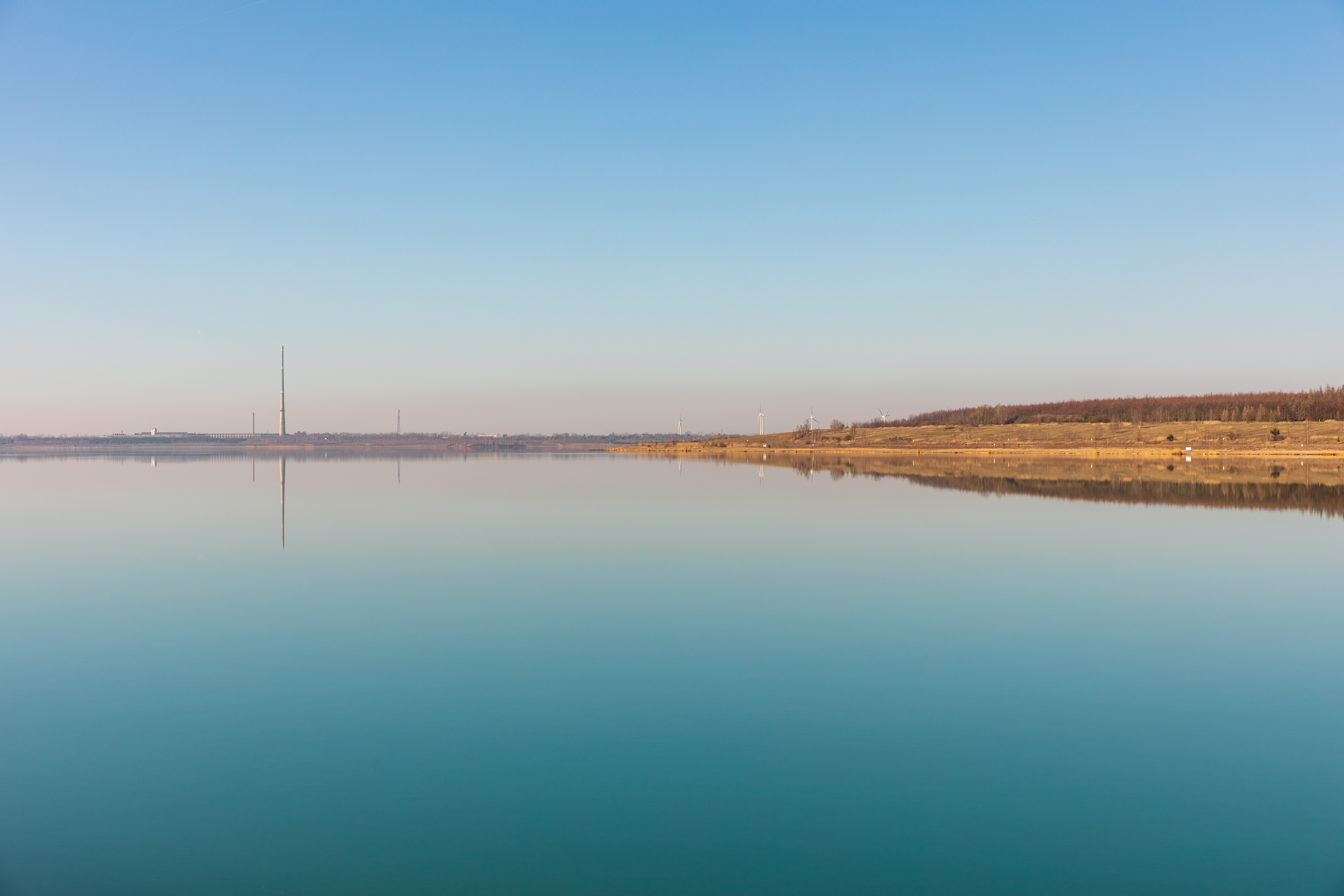
- Zwenkauer See (2015)

- Location within Germany
- Location: Saxony
- Coordinates: 51°14′22″N 12°18′19″E
- Type: artificial lake
- Basin countries: Germany
- Surface area: 9.7 km^{2} (3.7 sq mi)
- Max. depth: 48.5 m (159 ft)
- Water volume: 0.172 km^{3} (0.041 cu mi)
- Shore length^{1}: 22 km (14 mi)
- Surface elevation: 113.5 m (372 ft)
- References: Regionaler Planungsverband Leipzig-Westsachsen. Regionale Planungsstelle Leipzig, ed. (2015). Mitteldeutsche Seenlandschaft. Gewässerkatalog 2015-2017. Seen, Fließgewässer, Kanäle (in German) (5th ed.). p. 184-187. ISBN 978-3-00-048526-8.
- ^{1} Shore length is not a well-defined measure.

The Zwenkauer See (German: Lake Zwenkau) is the largest lake in the Neuseenland situated 12 kilometres (7 mi) south of Leipzig. It is on the site of a former lignite open cast mine. Zwenkauer See was opened for tourist use on 9 May 2015.

== Location and shape ==
Both Leipzig and Zwenkau have parts of the lake area. The shortest distance to Lake Cospuden to the north is about 700 metres (2,300 ft). The Bundesautobahn 38 runs between the two lakes. To the north of this is the Belantis amusement park.

The lake runs east of Zwenkau for about 2 kilometres (1 mi) in a roughly north-south direction with a width of around 400 metres (1,300 ft), then turns west after a northeast bulge, widening to 600 metres (2,000 ft), and opens up to form an approximate triangle with an edge length of 2.5 kilometres (2 mi).

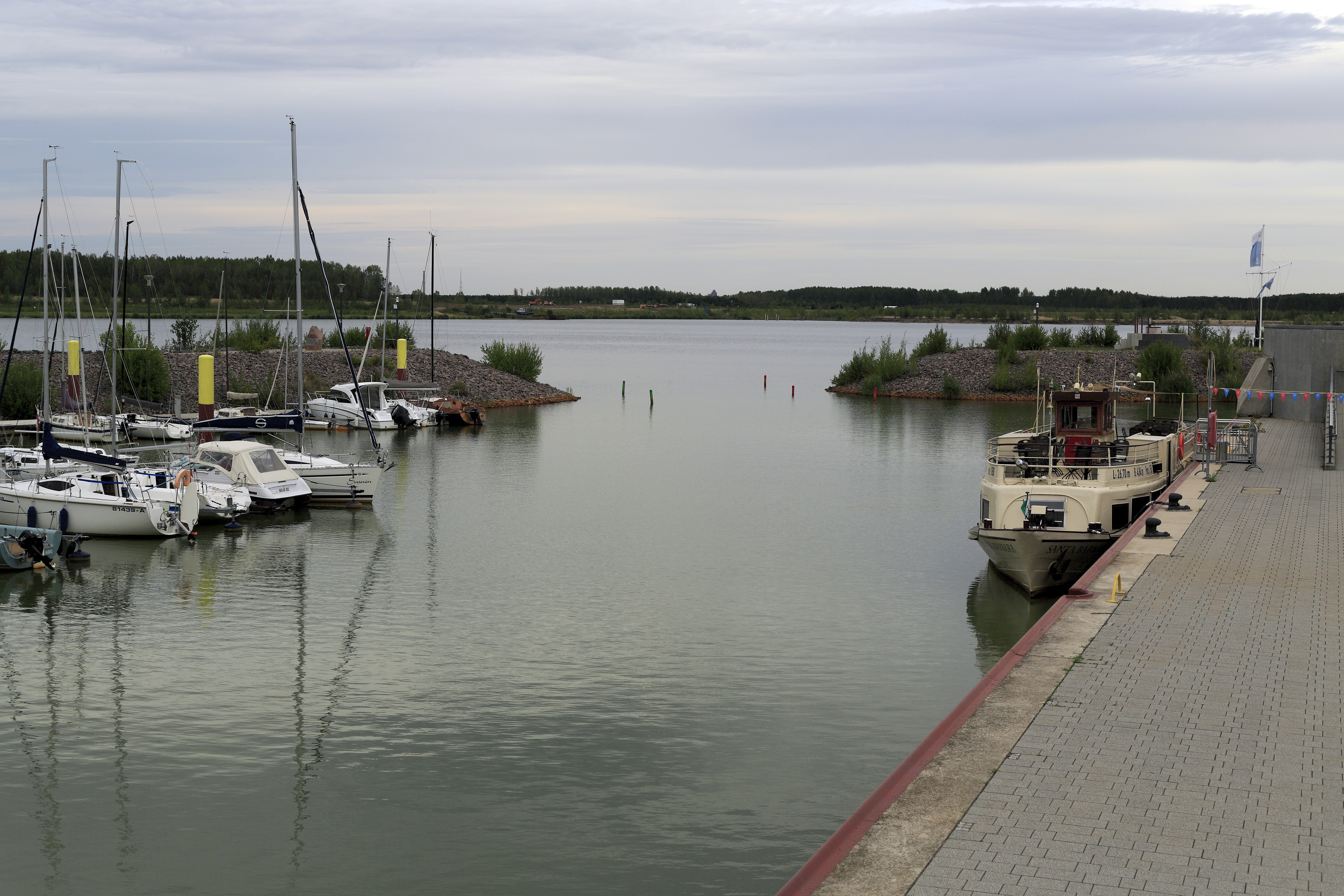
New sailing and water sports harbor at Kap Zwenkau

Since 2011, at the southern shore of the lake, at Kap Zwenkau, a new urban borough was built. Terraced mixed-use and residential areas are lined up around the new sailing and water sports harbor. The circular path around the lake for walking and cycling is roughly 22 km (14 mi) long.

== History ==
In 1921, the Böhlen open-cast mine was opened and lignite mining began. Year after year, the miners moved closer to Zwenkau with their heavy equipment. In 1965, the Böhlen opencast mine officially became the Zwenkau opencast mine. After 580 million tons of lignite had been extracted, the last coal train left the Zwenkau open-cast mine in 1999, and remediation could begin. The former open-cast mine has been flooded since 2007 and reached its provisional final water level in 2015.
