= Markkleeberger See =

Lake in Germany

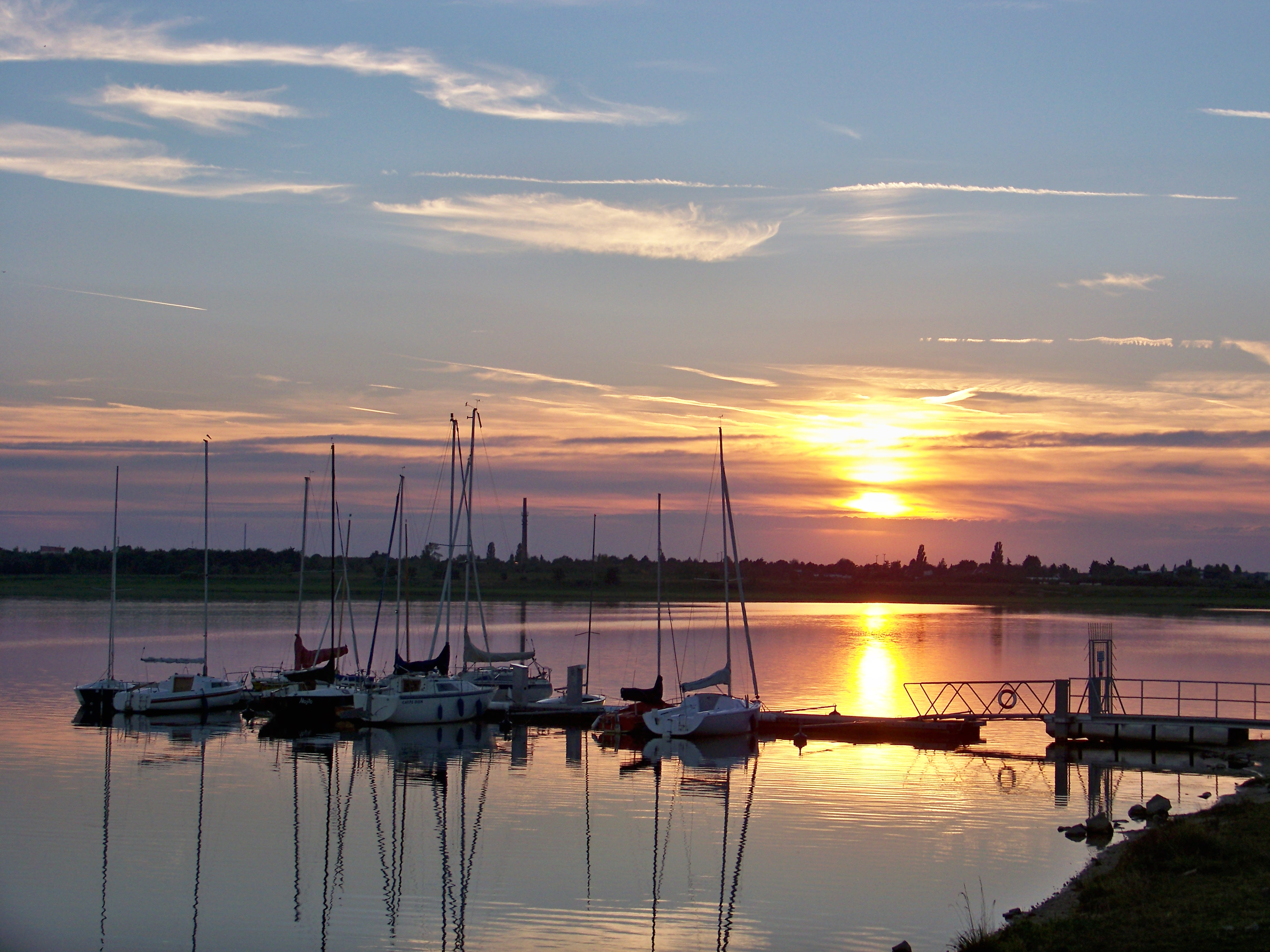

- Location within Saxony
- Location: Saxony
- Coordinates: 51°16′0.48″N 12°24′34.7″E
- Basin countries: Germany
- Surface area: 2.52 km^{2} (0.97 sq mi)
- Max. depth: ca. 57 to 63 m (187 to 207 ft)
- Surface elevation: 112.5 m (369 ft)
- Islands: Gezelauer Insel
- Settlements: Markkleeberg
- References: Regionaler Planungsverband Leipzig-Westsachsen. Regionale Planungsstelle Leipzig, ed. (2015). Mitteldeutsche Seenlandschaft. Gewässerkatalog 2015-2017. Seen, Fließgewässer, Kanäle (in German) (5th ed.). pp. 124–127. ISBN 978-3-00-048526-8.

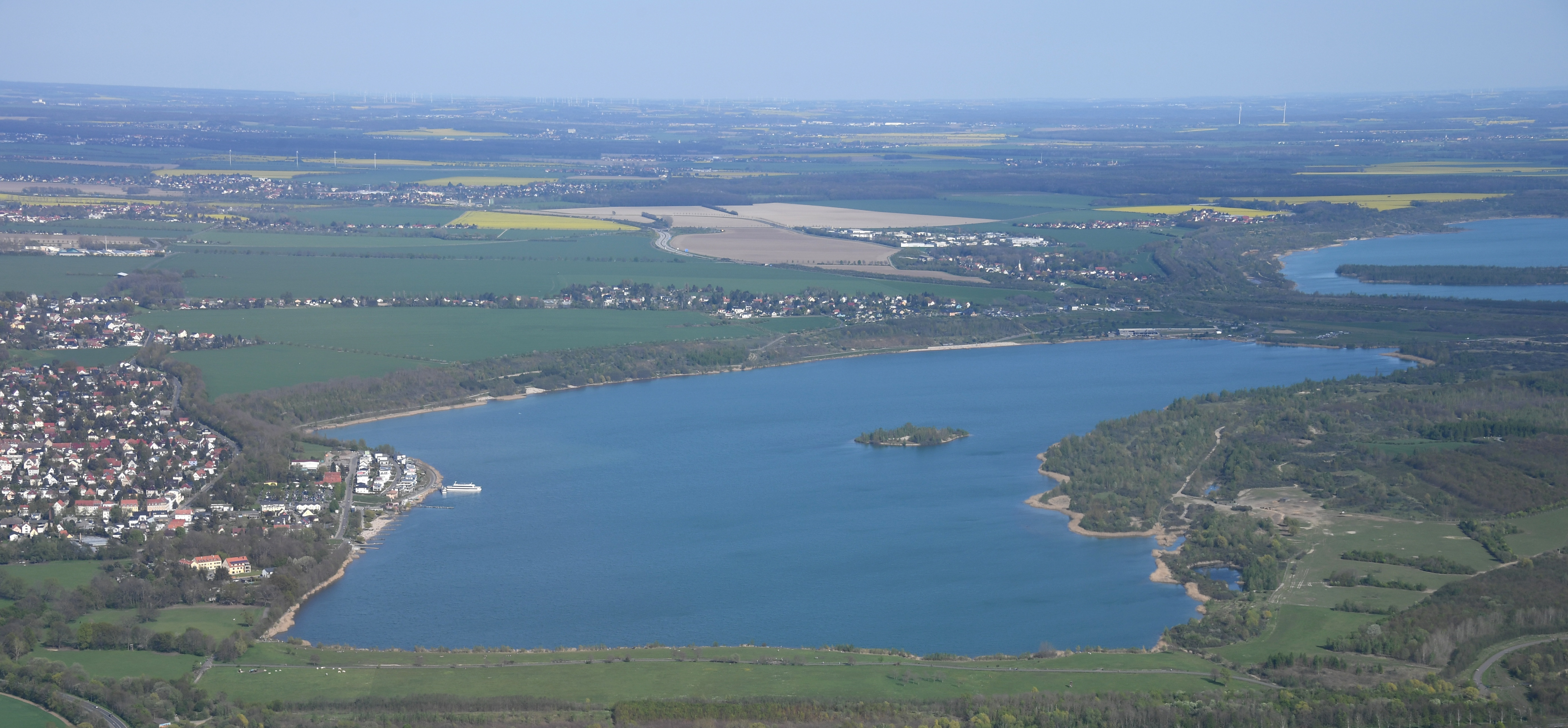
Aerial image of the Markkleeberger See seen from north, the Störmthaler See in the background

Markkleeberger See (in English: Lake Markkleeberg) is an artificial lake in Saxony, Germany, next to Markkleeberg, a suburb on the south side of Leipzig. At an elevation of 112.5 m, its surface area is 2.52 km^{2}. It is a former open-pit coal mine, flooded in 1999 with groundwater and developed in 2006 as a tourist area. On its southeastern shore is Germany's only pump-powered artificial whitewater slalom course, the Kanupark Markkleeberg.

Adjacently in the south, there is another artificial lake, which is named Störmthaler See. The two lakes, only separated by the Bundesautobahn 38, are part of the Central German Lake District.

An elegant 800 m (2,600 ft) long paved lake promenade runs along the northeastern embankment of the Markkleeberger See. Since September 2012, boat tours with two passenger ships have started here. In 2025, the motorship MS Markkleeberg offers round trips on the Markkleeberger See, whereas the other ship, the MS Wachau, cruises on the Störmthaler See.

== Störmthal Canal ==
On 18 May 2013, the 800 m (2,600 ft) long Störmthal canal connecting the two lakes was completed. A lock with a lift of 4 m (13 ft) was created here, since the lakes have different water levels. However, the canal is closed since March 2021 due to embankment damage and cracking. To mitigate the hazard, transverse structures were promptly constructed above and below the lock structure. A "Feasibility Study for the Rehabilitation of the Störmthal Canal Waterway Connection with the Compact Structure Between Störmthal and Markkleeberg Lakes" is underway. In February 2025 was announced, that the results of the feasibility study will be available in the first half-year of 2026.

== Trail network ==
Since its completion in 2009, it is possible to walk around the Markkleeberger See at various heights on an extensive network of paths - close to the water on the Unterer Uferweg (bank path) and above on the Uferrundweg (panoramic loop trail, length 9.2 km (5.7 mi)) and its numerous scenically attractive side paths. The best views offers the 45 m (148 ft) tall Auenhain spur on the southeastern bank of the lake. The 160 km (99 mi) long cycle path from Wittenberg to Markkleeberg under the name Kohle-Dampf-Licht-Seen (coal-steam-light-lakes) leads along the lake.

== Bathing beaches ==
Bathing beaches of various quality levels are the east side of the Markkleeberger See. A family beach is adjacent to the lake promenade, green beach bays are further south (called Wachau Beach), the sports beach and the dog beach follow in the south east (called Auenhain Beach). The west side of the lake, including an island called Gezelauer Insel, is not for bathing, because it is priority area for nature and landscape.
