= Hainer See =

Lake in Landkreis Leipzig, Saxony, Germany

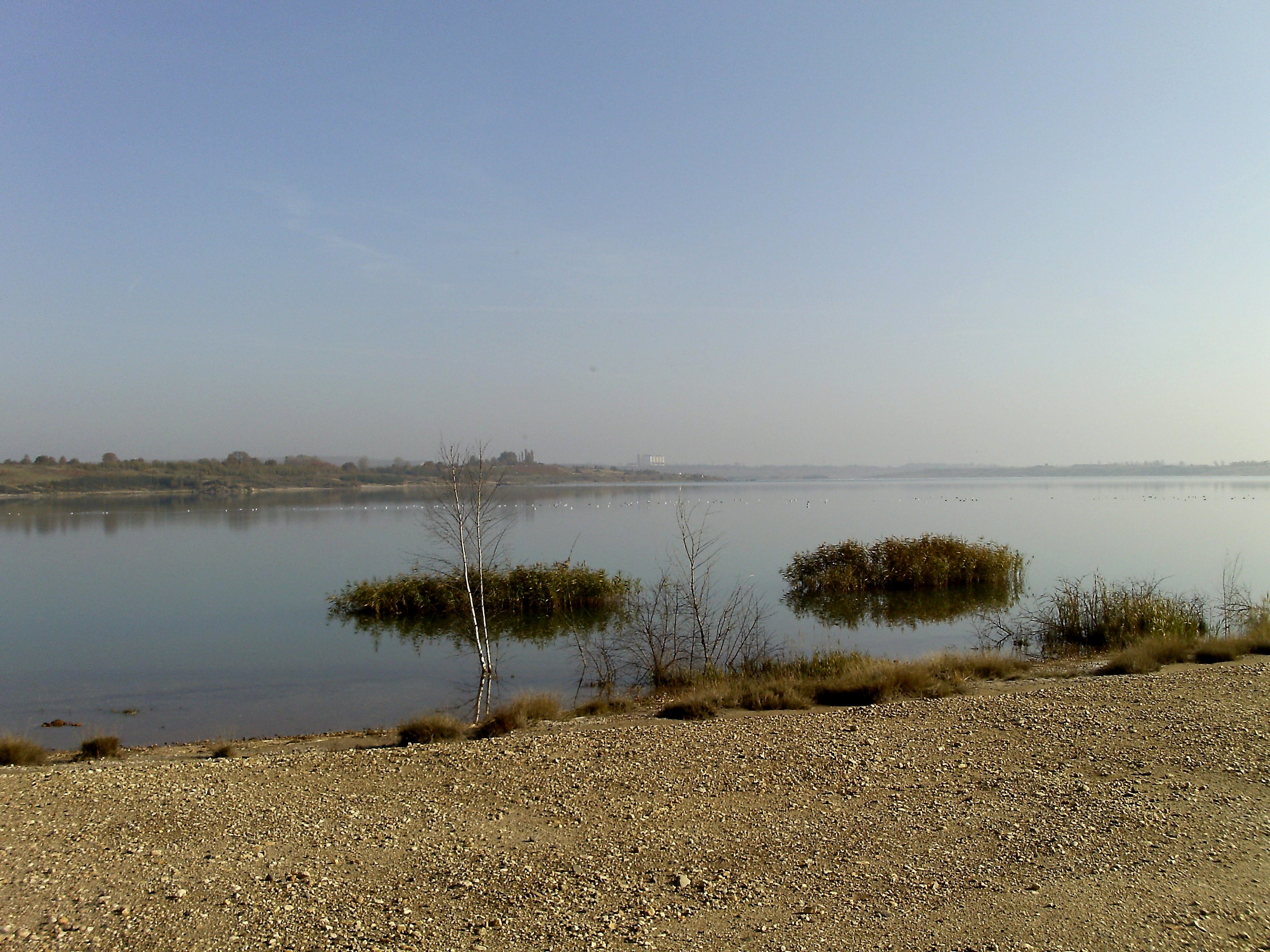
- View of Hainer See Lake

- Location within Saxony
- Location: Saxony
- Coordinates: 51°10′12.13″N 12°28′0.87″E
- Basin countries: Germany
- Surface area: 4 km^{2} (1.5 sq mi)
- Max. depth: 49 m (161 ft)
- Water volume: 73,000,000 m^{3} (2.6×10^{9} cu ft)
- Shore length^{1}: 12 km (7.5 mi)
- Surface elevation: 126 m (413 ft)
- Settlements: Borna
- ^{1} Shore length is not a well-defined measure.

Hainer See is a lake near Borna, Saxony, Germany. At an elevation of 126 m, its surface area is 4 km^{2} (2 sq mi). The lake is a part of the Central German Lake District.
