= Hosena =

- Ortsteil of Senftenberg
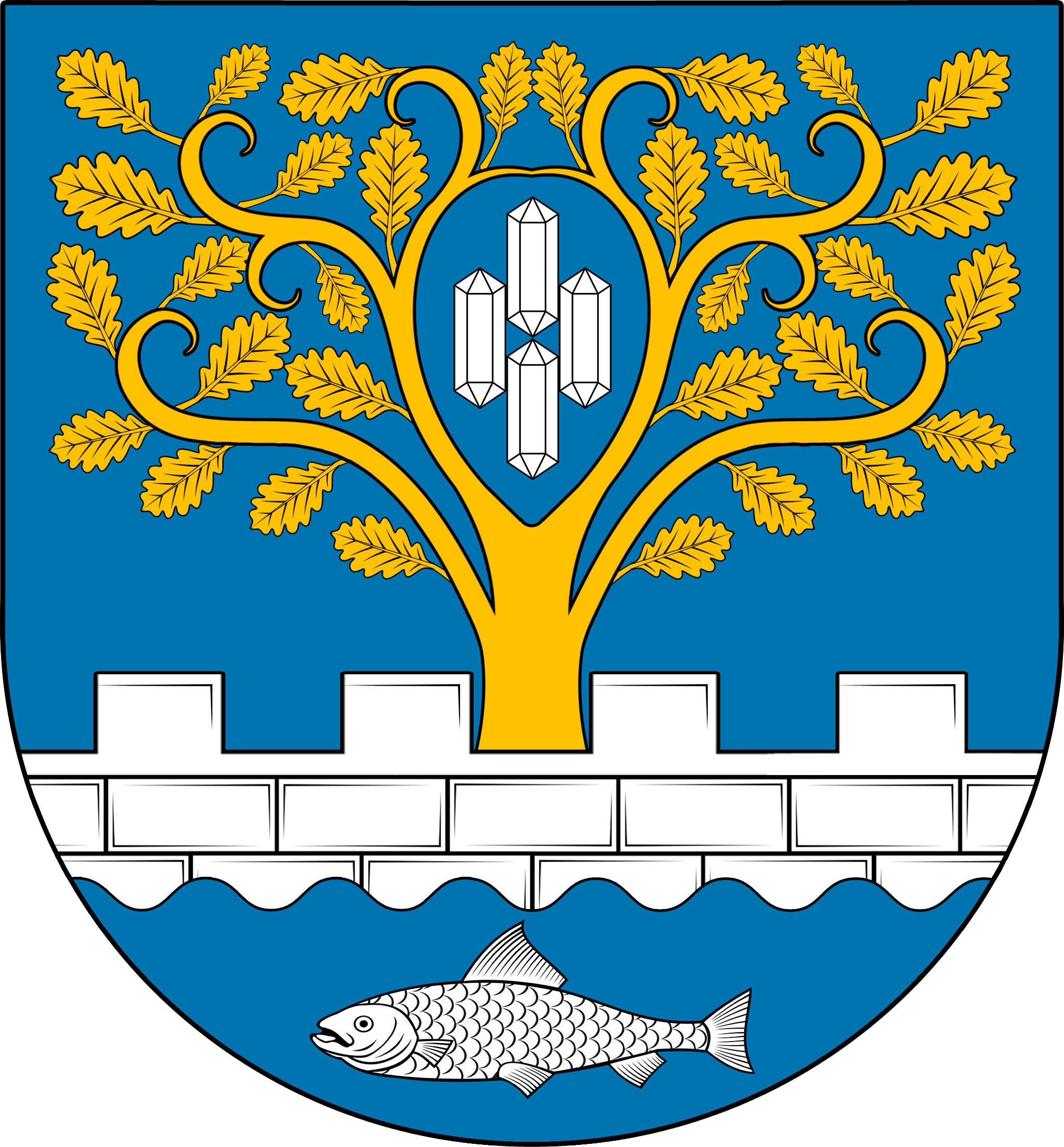
- Coat of arms
- Interactive map of Hosena
- Location within Germany Location within Brandenburg
- Country: Germany
- State: Brandenburg
- District: Oberspreewald-Lausitz
- Town: Senftenberg

Population (2019)
  - Total: 1,673
- Time zone: UTC+01:00 (CET)
  - Summer (DST): UTC+02:00 (CEST)
- Postal codes: 01996
- Dialling codes: 035756
- Vehicle registration: OSL, CA, SFB

Hosena (Sorbian: Hóznja) is a borough (Ortsteil) of the town of Senftenberg in Brandenburg, Germany. Hosena is located in Upper Lusatia not far from the Senftenberger See. Hosena station is at the junction of the Węgliniec–Roßlau railway and the Lübbenau–Kamenz railway.

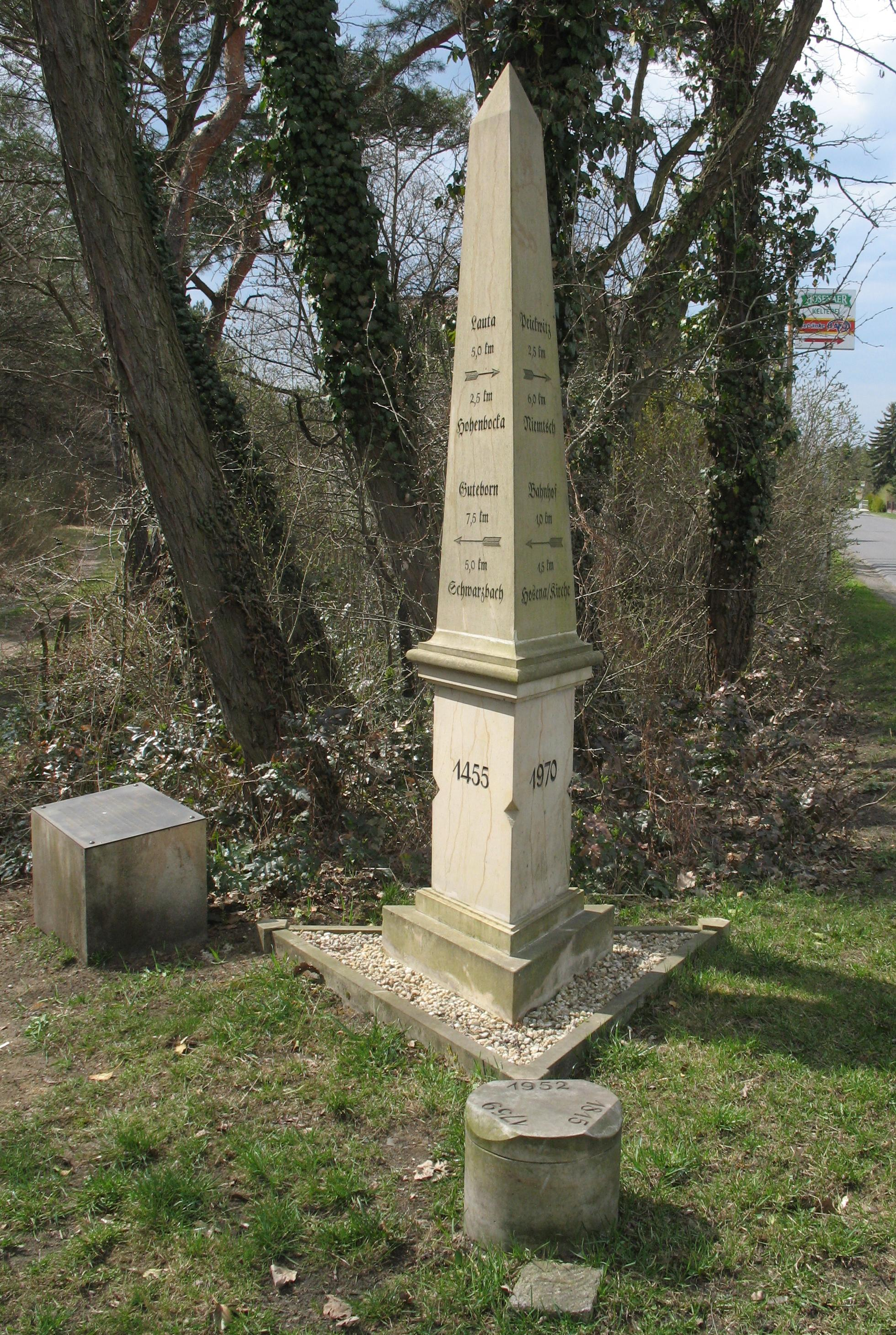
Obelisk

== History ==
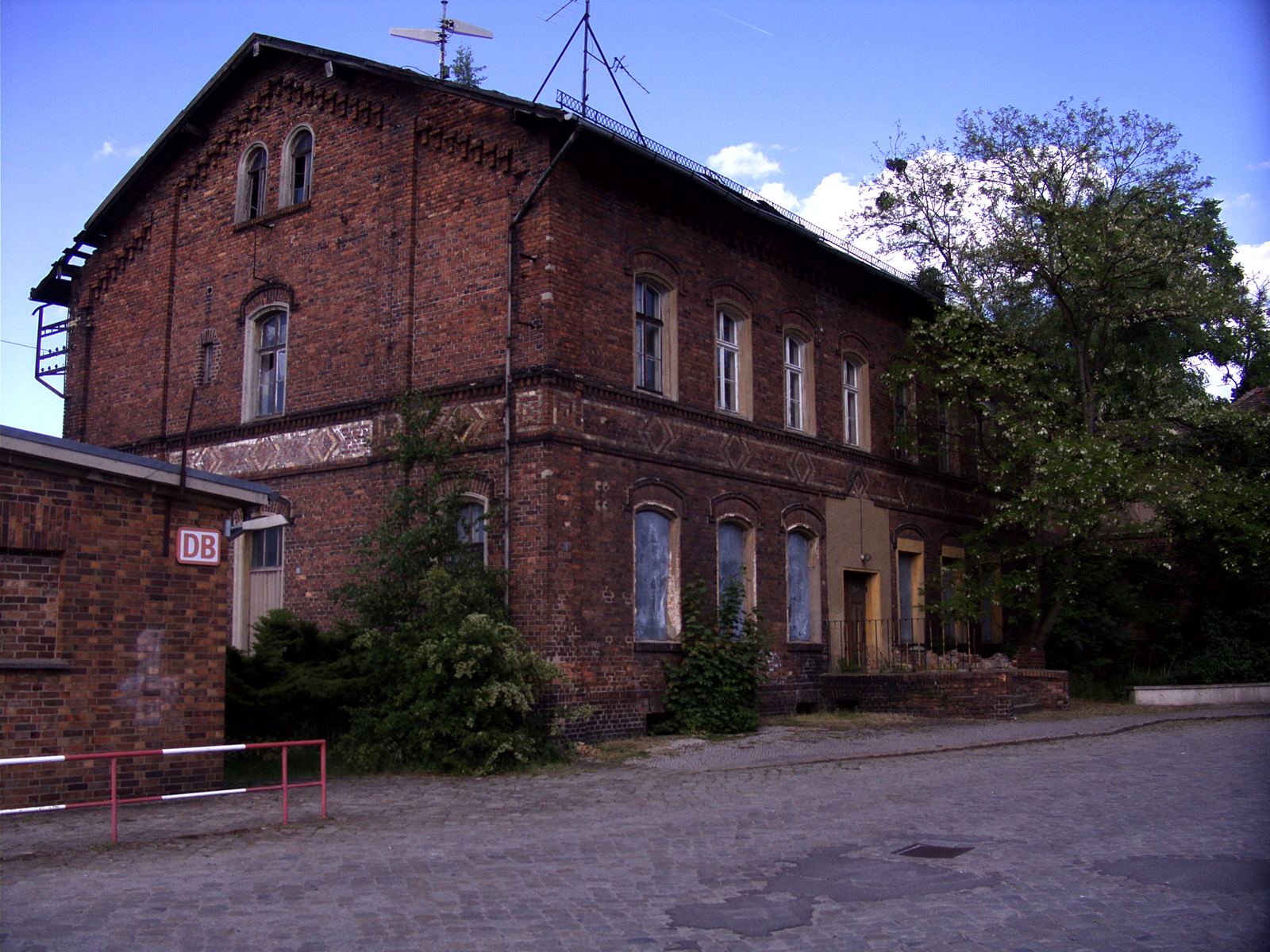
Passenger building, Hosena station

Hosena is first mentioned in 1420, as Old Slavonic gozd or hozd for "dry woodland" or Sorbian "woodland place." The name developed into Hoznja, Hozne or Hosna and finally to Hosen, attested in 1687.

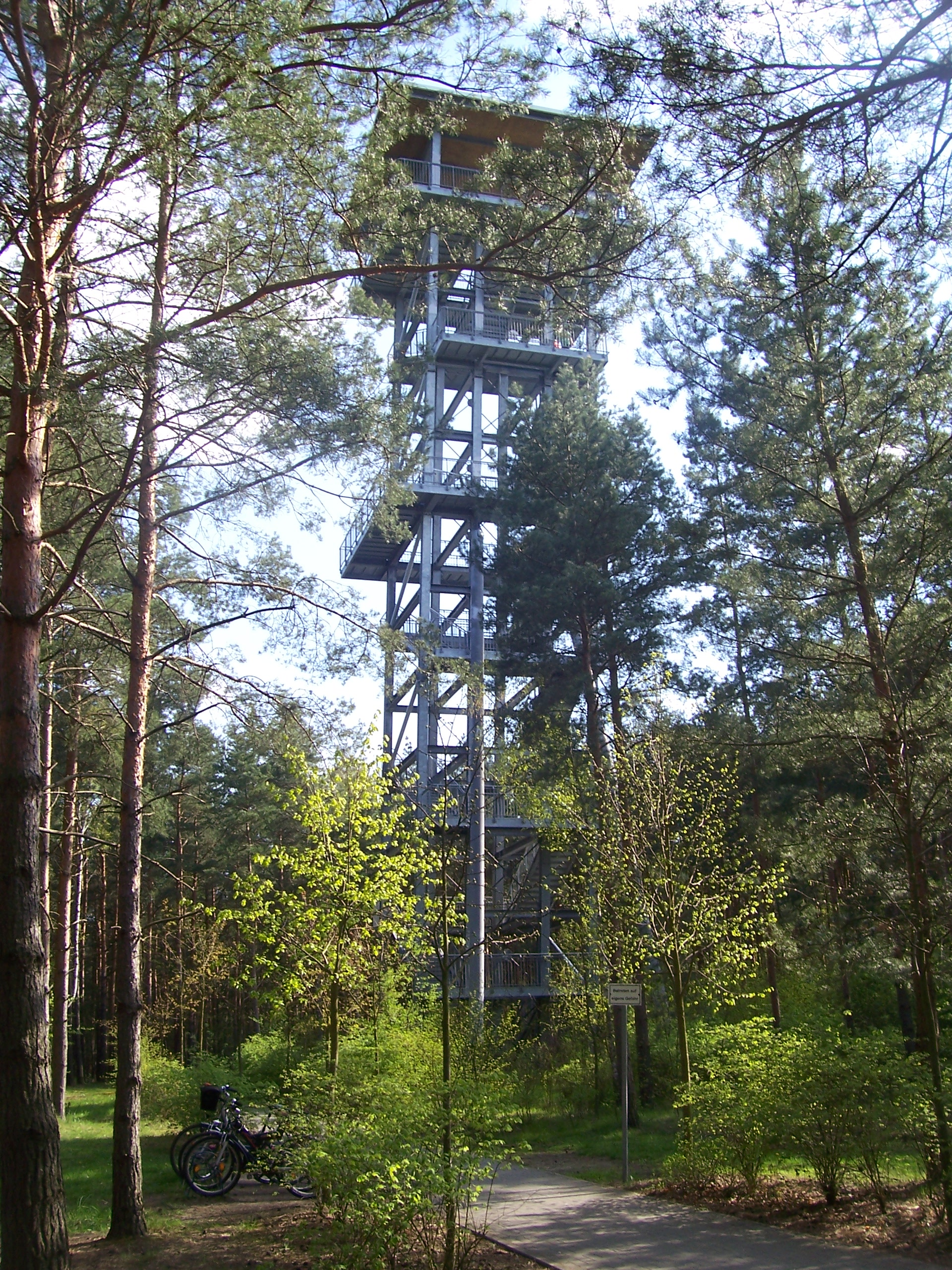
Observation tower on the south shore of the Senftenberger See.

In the early historical period, Hosena was part of the Sorbian district of Milska and a Folwark to the domain of Hoyerswerda, with a herd of sheep and three leasehold mills. Hosena is first mentioned in 1420. In 1575, 68 people lived on the estate. In 1691, the settlement was completely destroyed by fire. Since the end of the 19th century, Hosena has become famous for industrial processing of crystalline quartz sand and for glass making. The first extraction of the sand was in 1874, and in 1896 the first glassworks were opened. They closed in 1929. Prior to that, the settlement had been among the poorest heathland villages, since the barren, largely infertile sandy soil yielded only meager harvests. A second glassworks started production in 1907 and was closed in 1993. As the sand pits were taken out of production, the sand quarries were converted into small lakes for swimming. As a result, in 1899 the Hosena Aquatics Club was founded. The village church was consecrated in 1913.

In 1970, the settlement of Peickwitzer Flur was incorporated into Hosena. It had been founded as a result of industrialization; railroad workers and employees of the nearby glass works and sand quarries lived there. A 2.6 m tall marker column was erected there in July 2009

Today a tilted observation tower stands at the boundary of Hosena on the shore of the Senftenberger See. On December 31, 2001, Hosena was incorporated into Senftenberg. The mayor is Hagen Schuster.

=== Battle of Koschenberg ===
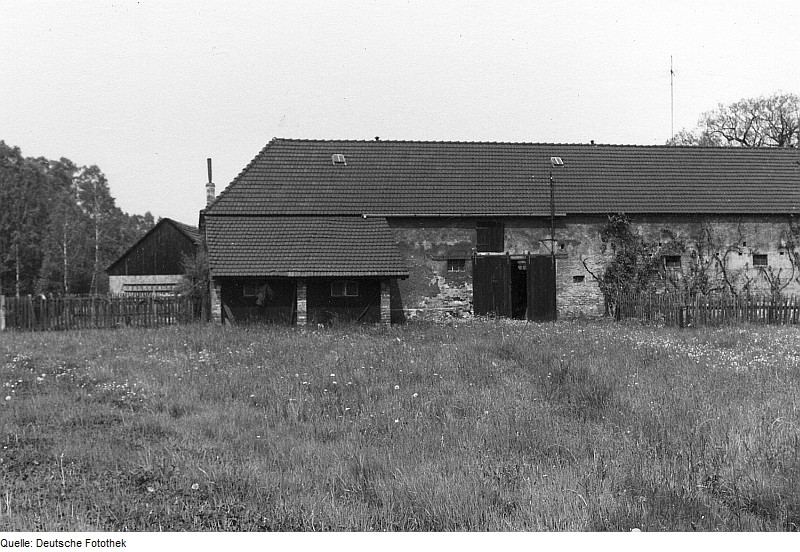
The Blood Mill - the legendary site of the Battle of Koschenberg

Legend has it that in 923 a fantastic battle took place in Hosena between the troops of King Henry the Fowler and the Wends, who settled on the Koschenberg, under the command of Radbot, in which Henry was supported by Margrave Gero. In the course of the battle Gero split Radbot's helmet and skull with a blow from his sword. When the Wends saw their leader fall, they fled. This battle is also called the Battle of the Blood Mill (or Pluto Mill).

== Railway accidents at Hosena station ==
On 26 July 2012 a serious railway accident occurred in Hosena station. A freight train loaded with crushed rock ballast ran into the flank of a train of empty hoppers which were to be loaded in a nearby quarry. The collision destroyed a signal box and killed a railwayman working there. Both drivers were hurt. 34 freight cars, one locomotive, tracks and overhead wires were damaged. The accident was caused by the brake pipes of the ballast train being closed between the locomotive and the first waggon, leaving only the brakes of the locomotive operational which were insufficient to stop the train.

A second accident occurred on 11 November 2013 almost in the same place when an empty freight train collided with a loaded one standing in the station. The driver of the oncoming train was hurt, several freight cars and the locomotive were damaged, the latter beyond repair. The suspected cause of the accident was a signalling error.

== Demographics ==
Population development in Hosena 1875-2000
Year	Inhabitants	Year	Inhabitants	Year	Inhabitants	Year	Inhabitants	Year	Inhabitants	Year	Inhabitants
1875	700	1933	2202	1964	2475	1989	2283	1993	2128	1997	2095
1890	700	1939	2586	1971	2853	1990	2226	1994	2109	1998	2060
1910	1500	1946	2598	1981	2511	1991	2148	1995	2104	1999	2072
1925	1853	1950	2662	1985	2383	1992	2117	1996	2125	2000	2054

== Attractions ==
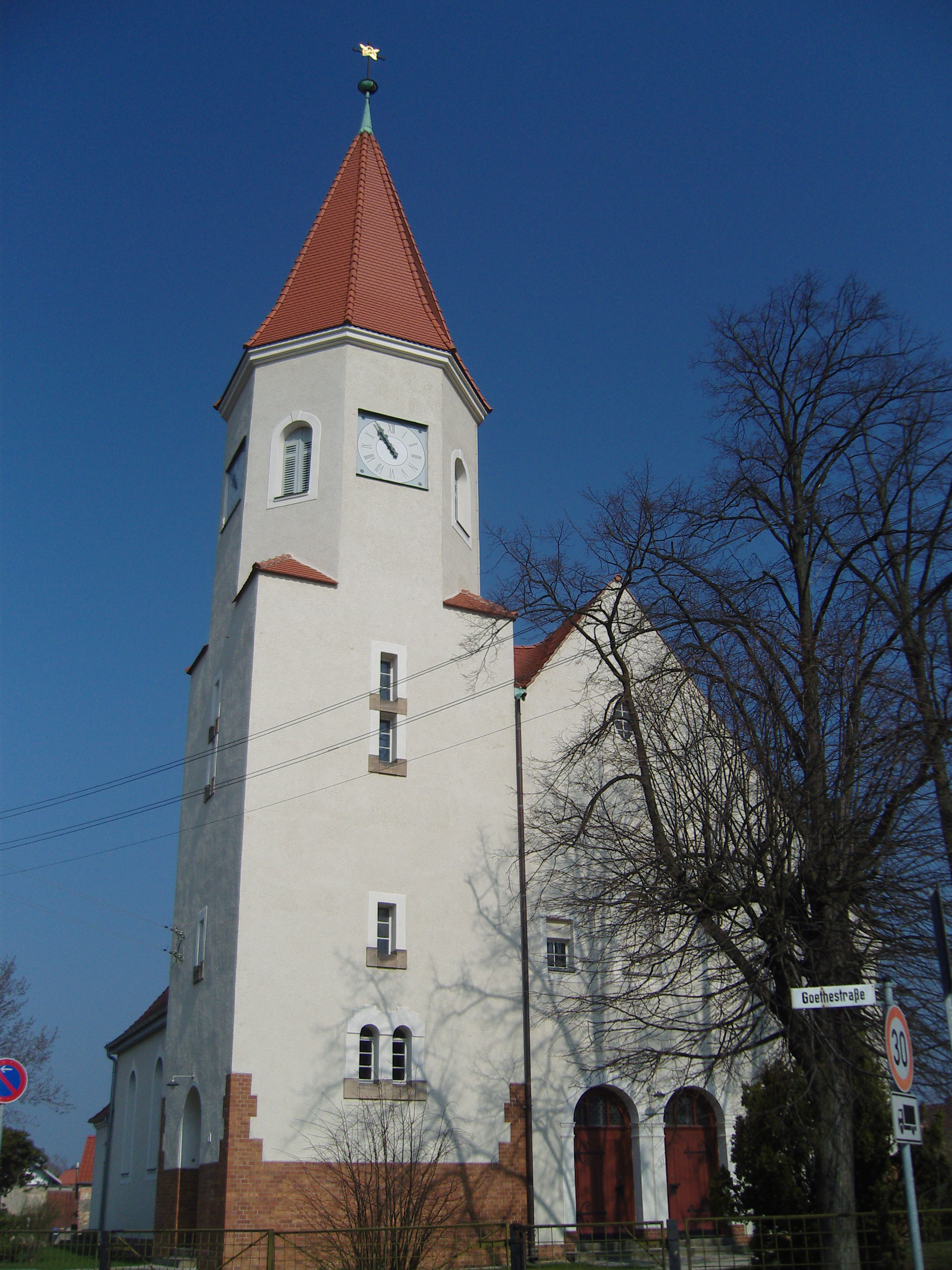
Church

Built in 1913, the village church is among the historical buildings in Senftenberg. In front of the church there is a war memorial to the fallen of the First World War. There is a stone cross in the village.

== Economy ==
The largest employer in Hosena is the steelworks Züblin Stahlbau GmbH, with well over 300 employees.

== Notable people ==
Joachim Sauer, professor of Physical and Theoretical Chemistry at Humboldt University of Berlin and husband of German Chancellor Angela Merkel, was born in Hosena.

== Sources ==
- Isolde Rösler and Heinz Noack. Senftenberger See: Historische Wanderungen durch Buchwalde, Kleinkoschen, Großkoschen, Hosena, Peickwitz, Niemtsch, Brieske, Kolonie Marga. Kreismuseum Senftenberg. Horb am Neckar: Geiger, 1993. ISBN 3-89264-872-7.
