= Geiseltalsee =

Artificial lake in Germany

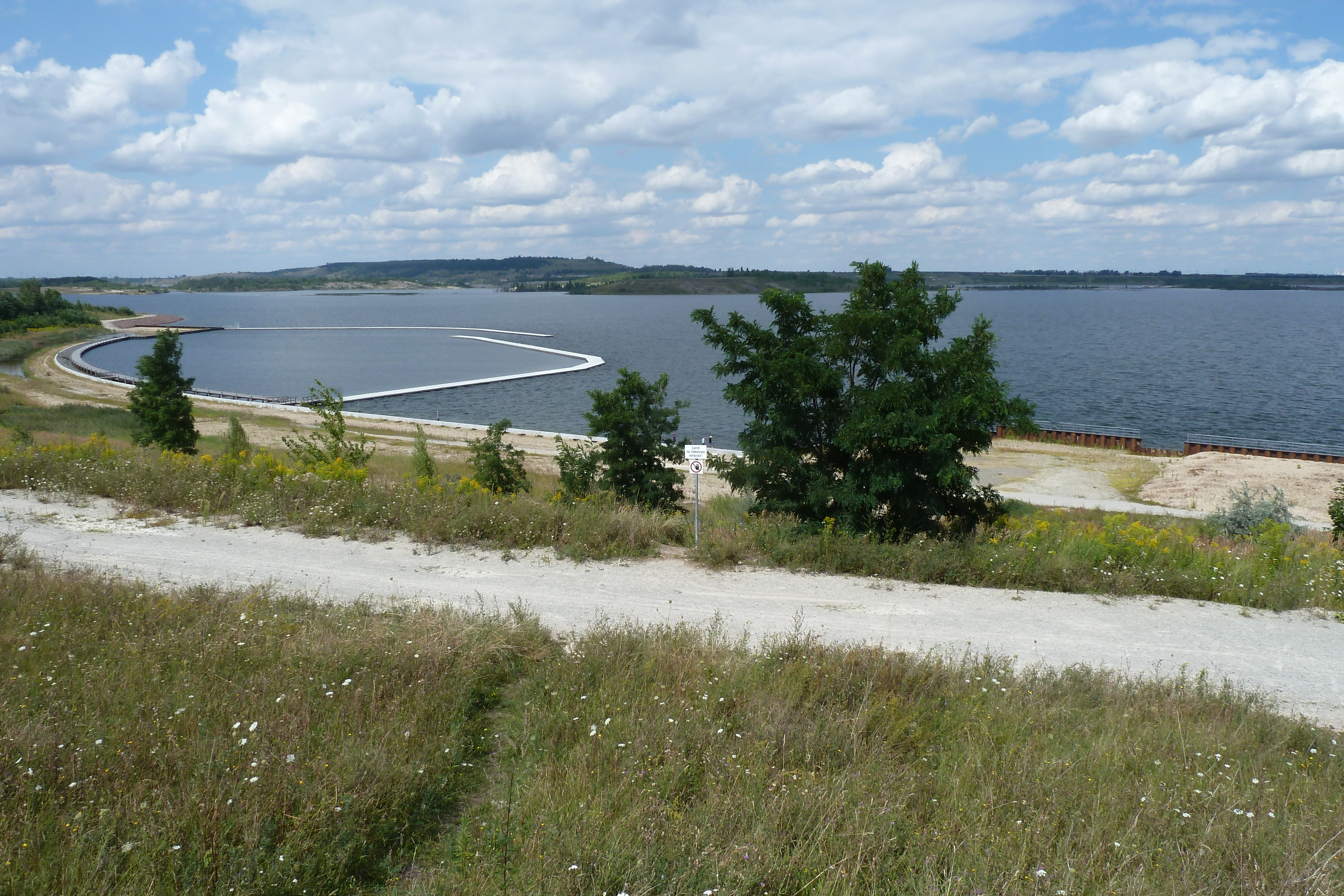

- Location within Germany
- Location: Saalekreis district, Saxony-Anhalt, Germany
- Coordinates: 51.3080°N 11.8854°E
- Type: flooded former open pit lignite mine
- Part of: Central German Lake District
- Primary inflows: Saale
- Built: June 30, 1993 - conversion from mine begun June 30, 2003 - flooding begun
- First flooded: June 30, 2003 - begin of flooding April 29, 2011 - end of flooding
- Max. length: 7.3 kilometres (4.5 mi)
- Max. width: 3.5 kilometres (2.2 mi)
- Surface area: 1,840 hectares (4,500 acres)
- Average depth: 23 metres (75 ft)
- Max. depth: 78 metres (256 ft)
- Water volume: 423,000,000 cubic metres (1.49×10^{10} cu ft)

Geiseltalsee, literally Geisel valley lake, is at about 1,840 hectares (4,500 acres) the largest artificial lake by area in Germany. Once flooding of the Cottbuser Ostsee is complete it will surpass Geiseltalsee in surface area, covering 19 square kilometres (7.3 sq mi). Geiseltalsee lies in the Saalekreis district of the state Saxony-Anhalt. The lake was created in 2003-11 by flooding a former opencast lignite mine in the Geiseltal (Geisel valley); the name of that valley had become widely known due to the notable fossil record which emerged from that coal mine.

== Dimensions ==
At 18.4 square kilometres (7.1 sq mi) surface area it is the largest artificial lake in Germany by surface area until Cottbuser Ostsee reaches its planned final size of 19 square kilometres (7.3 sq mi). Containing some 0.423 cubic kilometres (0.101 cu mi) of water it is far more voluminous than Cotbusser Ostsee will be (planned to have a volume of 0.150 cubic kilometres (0.036 cu mi) once flooding is complete) and also exceeds Germany's most voluminous reservoir, Bleilochtalsperre, by about a 2:1 margin (volume of Bleilochtalsperre being roughly 0.215 cubic kilometres (0.052 cu mi)). At a maximum depth of 78 metres (256 ft) it is the sixth deepest lake of any kind in Germany and the deepest not wholly or partly (like Lake Constance) in the state of Bavaria. However, the depth of flooded former open pit mines tends to decrease in the first few decades after flooding, as evidenced by Senftenberger See which was flooded from 1967 to 1972 reaching a maximum depth of 40 metres (130 ft) but which has no point exceeding a depth of 25 metres (82 ft) according to more recent measurements.

== Location ==
Geiseltalsee is bordered by the village of Mücheln to the southwest, west, and northwest, the towns of Braunsbedra to the northeast, east, and southeast, and of Bad Lauchstädt for a small stretch to the northwest. The lake is a part of the Central German Lake District.

== History ==
The lake is the product of extensive lignite mining in the area which first shows up in the documentary record in 1698 but which only reached significant extent in the late 19th and early 20th century when the first open-pit mines in the area were started. After World War II, the area came under the control of the Soviet Occupation Zone which would soon give rise to the German Democratic Republic (GDR). Due to a desire for autarky and a dearth of natural resources other than lignite (and uranium in the Ore Mountains, which however mostly went to the Soviet nuclear program), lignite mining ramped up sharply in the GDR, converting a country of less than 20 million inhabitants to the world's top producer and user of this commodity.

As nearby Leuna had been a center of the chemical industry, lignite, besides being used for home heating (usually as briquettes) and for power generation in lignite fired steam power plants, also saw extensive use as a feedstock for the chemical industry, including through processes such as coal liquefaction. While coal is less desirable as a chemical feedstock than petroleum, the ability to save on hard currency by using it to substitute petroleum made it the preferred solution in East Germany.

After German reunification, the demand for lignite dropped sharply as reunified Germany could import petroleum on the world market and superior domestic hard coal from the Ruhr area and other then-active mining areas in West Germany competed with lignite. Furthermore, lignite is by far the most ecologically damaging fossil fuel due to its high moisture content, high sulfur content (producing acid rain upon combustion) and frequent contamination with toxic heavy metals. Thus it was decided to wind down large parts of East German lignite mining with the mines now covered by the lake shut down in 1993. By that point some 1.4 gigatonnes (1.4×10^{9} long tons; 1.5×10^{9} short tons) of lignite and a similar amount of overburden had been mined over the existence of the mine and some 12,500 people who had lived on land now taken up by mining had had to be resettled.

While there had been vague plans to flood the resulting "holes" left over from mining (even if all overburden were filled back into the former mine, the "missing" coal would mean the surface would still be below the natural water table) as had been done with what is now Senftenberger See, the plans for the 80 metres (260 ft) deep and 2,600 hectares (6,400 acres) wide former mine were only seriously made after reunification. After the mine closed on 30 June 1993 exactly a decade of earthworks to ensure slope stability and eliminate the danger of landslides followed and flooding started on 30 June 2003.

While all open pit mines operating below the natural water table require the lowering of the water table (usually via extensive pumping), simply letting the water table rise naturally is usually not enough to quickly flood the former pit. Besides allowing quick conversion to new uses, quick flooding is also desirable as it reduces the risk and amount of acid mine drainage (minerals like pyrite which are stable in anoxic conditions oxidize if exposed to air, giving rise to sulfuric acid - this process is slowed or stopped by covering those minerals in water). Thus it was decided to use the nearby Saale river as a source of water to ensure quick flooding. Flooding was completed by 2011 and the water level in the new lake had risen by 1 centimetre (0.4 in) per day during flooding. A water level of 98.05 m above Normalhöhennull was reached on 29 April 2011. However, due to seepage, water from outside sources will probably have to be provided for a further two decades.
