= Lusatian Lake District =

Chain of artificial lakes under construction in Germany

Coordinates: 51°30′06″N 14°11′30″E

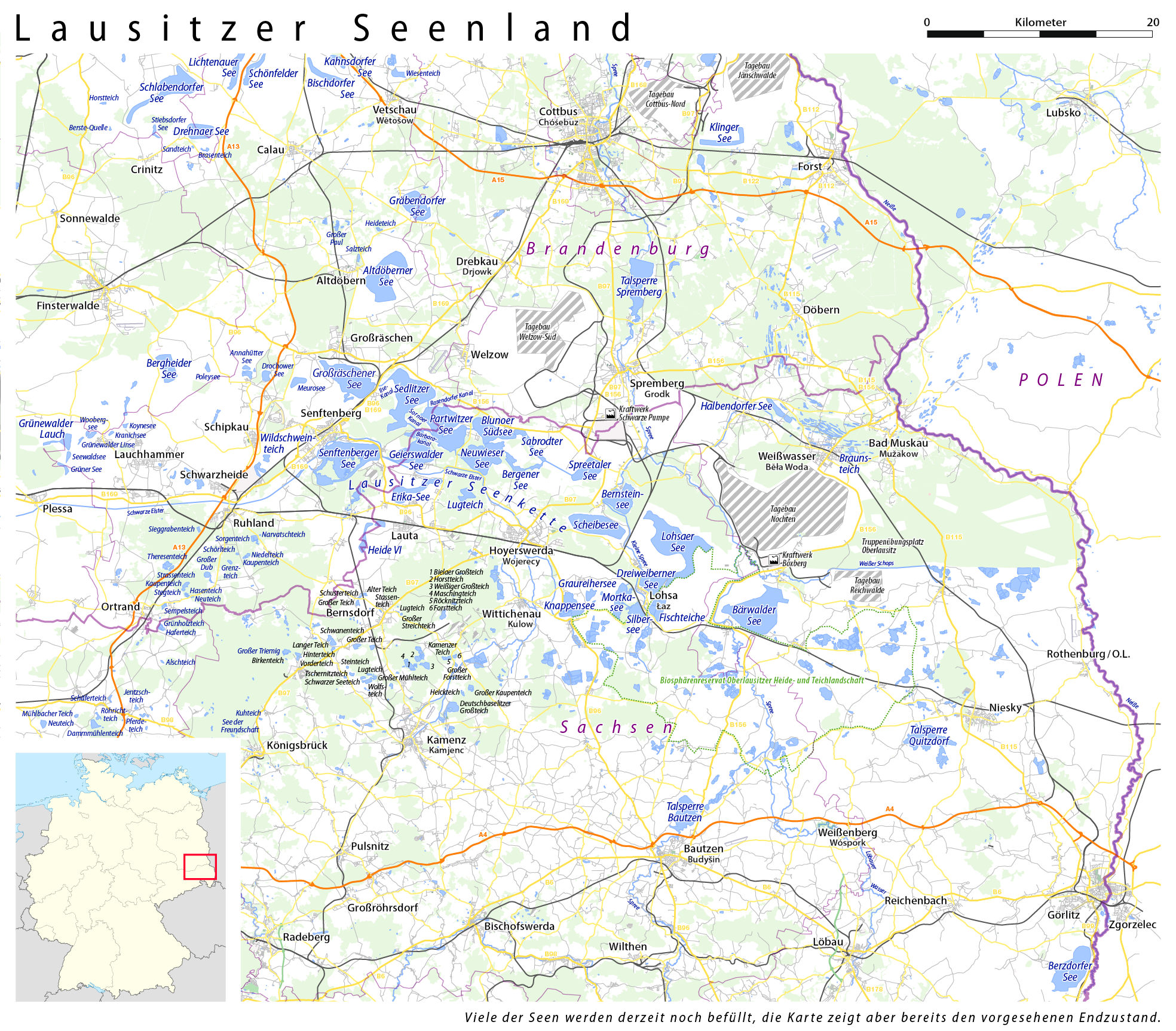
The Lusatian Lake District and its surrounding area

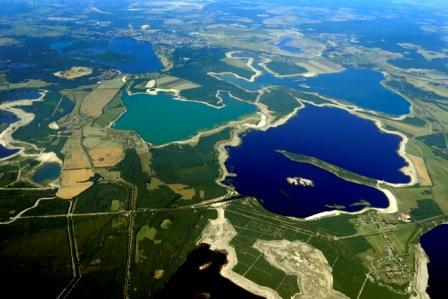
Section of the chain of lakes

The Lusatian Lake District (German: Lausitzer Seenland, Lower Sorbian: Łužyska jazorina, Upper Sorbian: Łužiska jězorina) is a chain of artificial lakes under construction in Germany across the north-eastern part of Saxony and the southern part of Brandenburg. Through flooding as a part of an extensive regeneration programme, several decommissioned lignite opencast mines are in the process of being transformed into Europe's largest artificial lake district. However, the requirements of the project, especially the necessary water resources, are controversial.

== Geography ==
The Lusatian Lake District lies in Lusatia between Calau in Brandenburg and Görlitz in Saxony. The extent of what will become Europe's largest artificial lake district is an area 80 kilometres (50 miles) from east to west and, depending on the boundary chosen, 32 to 40 kilometres (20 to 25 mi) from north to south.

A distinction is made between the German terms Seenland ("lake district") and Seenkette ("chain of lakes"). The "Lusatian Lake Chain" (Lausitzer Seenkette) refers to those lakes that are linked by navigable canals. They are located in the centre of Lusatia between Senftenberg and Hoyerswerda, and include Lake Senftenberg which has developed since 1973 into an important recreational and tourist centre.

== Formation ==
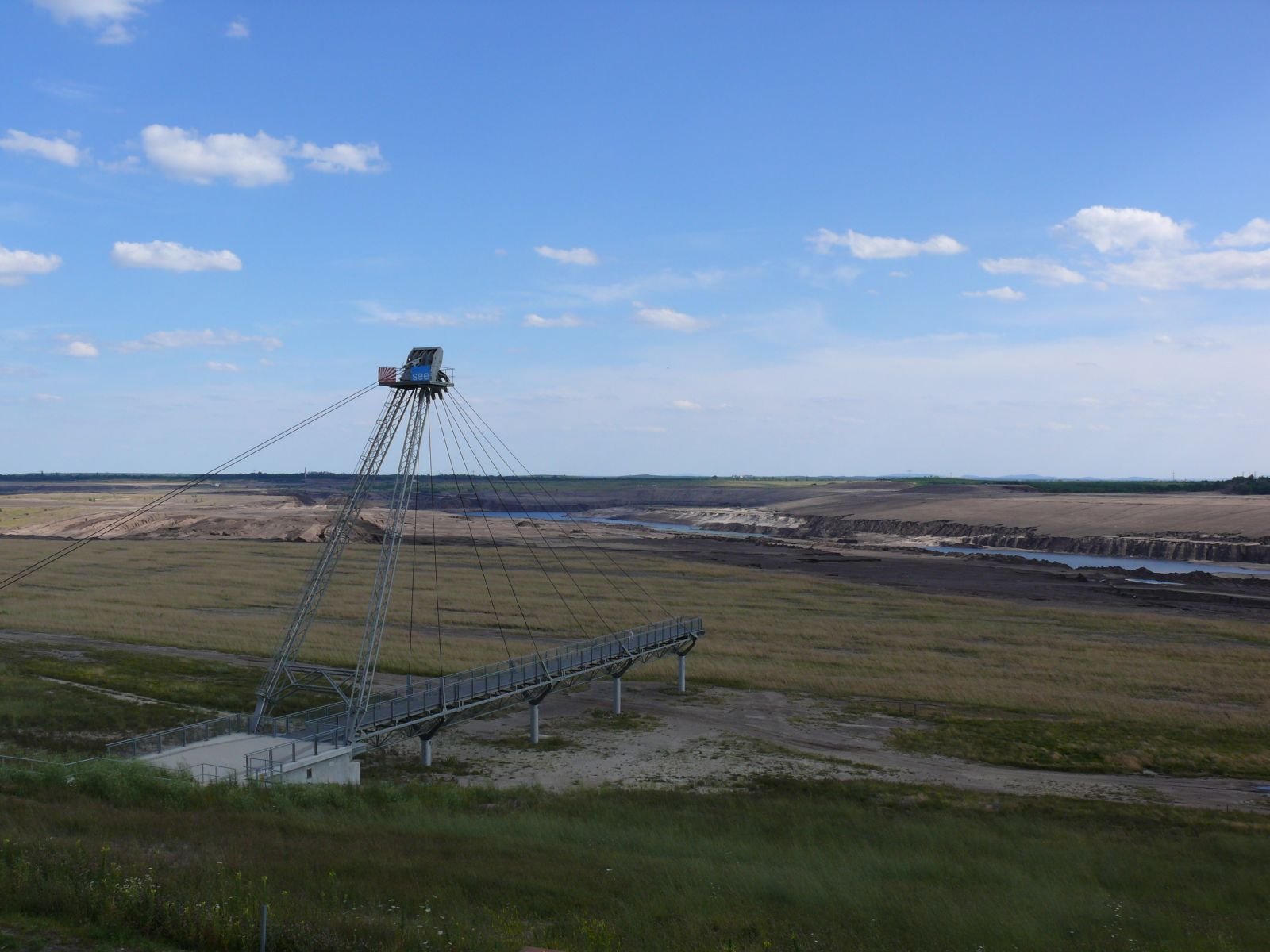
The resulting gravel pit lakes: here the Ilsesee near Großräschen

Since the end of the 19th century, the area had been an industrial region, producing lignite and electricity. With the reunification of Germany in 1990, it was decided to end this long tradition because of the dwindling quantity of lignite and the heavy pollution of the surrounding environment. Although mining continues and some big power stations continue to produce electricity with lignite, the federal government decided that all lignite mining in the area is to cease due to the CO_{2} emissions. There are plans to invest billions of Euros into the region to ease the structural transformation of a region heretofore dependent on mining.

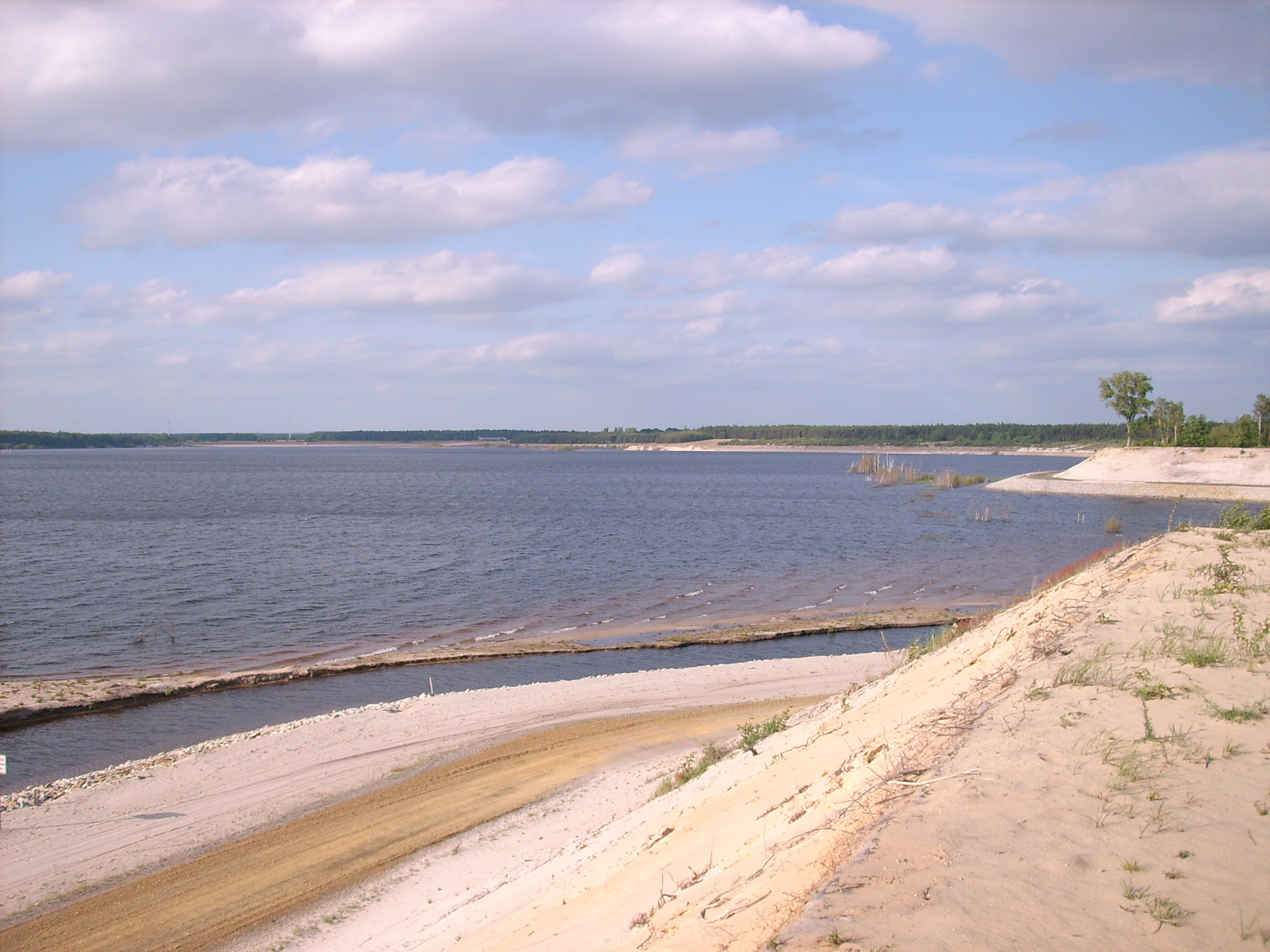
The coal-free shore zones of the lakes

Since the 1970s, some of the old pits left by the mining process have been transformed into a new landscape formerly unknown in this region. What was once a plain overgrown with heather and a few trees is now a lake district comparable to the Mecklenburg Lake Plateau in Mecklenburg or the Masurian Lakeland in Poland. It all began with the creation of the Knappensee and Lake Senftenberg, still one of the biggest lakes in the region.

The creation of new lakes is an ongoing process and it can take decades from the end of mining to the lake reaching its desired "final level" of water. The Cottbuser Ostsee started flooding in 2019 and is planned to become one of the largest at 19 km^{2} (7 sq. mi.) surface area.

== Lakes ==
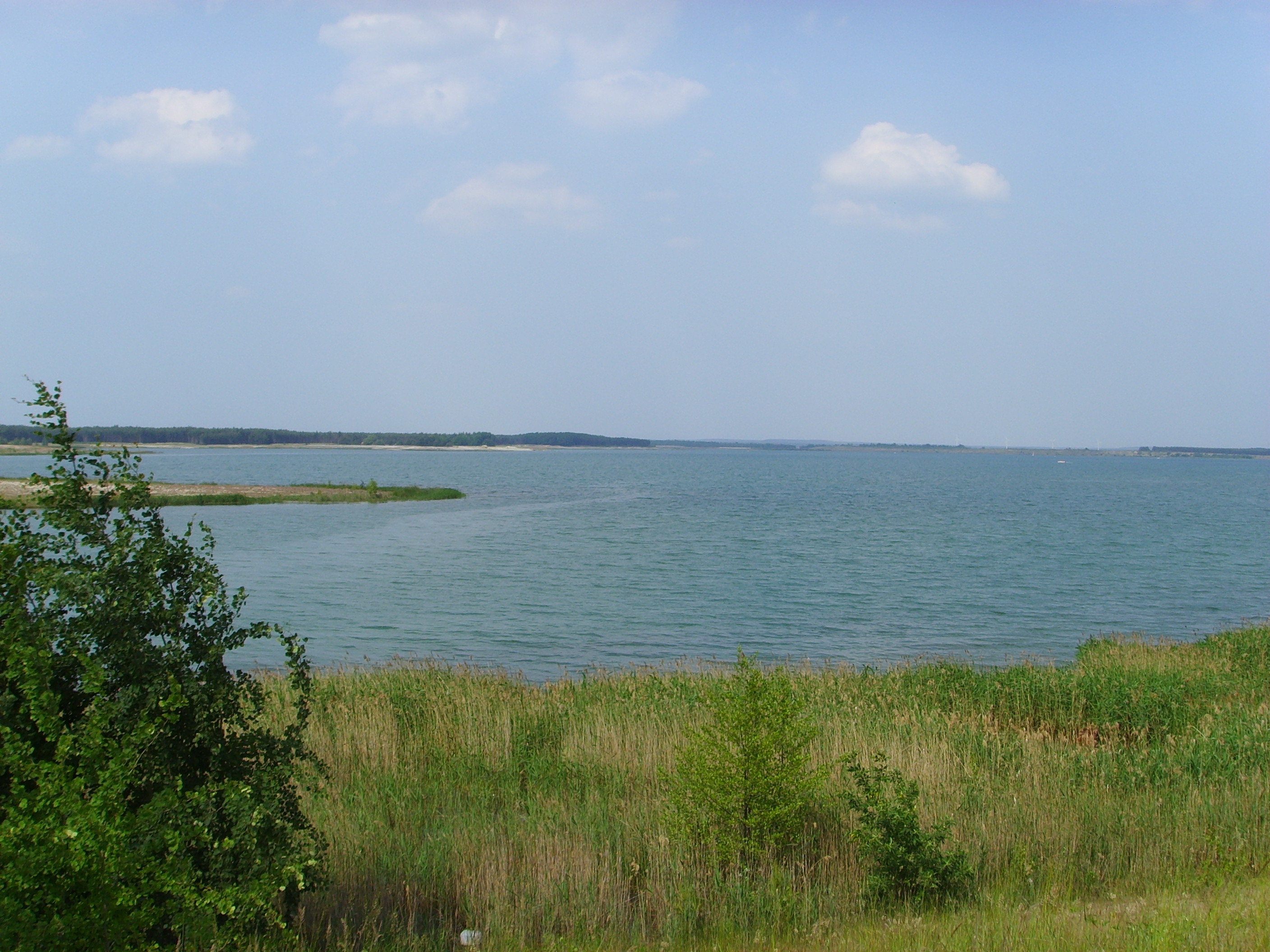
The Geierswalder See east of Senftenberg

Further lakes have already been established, and plans for over twenty more large lakes have been drawn up. Lakes that have already been created include:

- in the north: the Gräbendörfer See, Altdöberner See and Bergheiner See
- in the centre: Lake Senftenberg, Ilsesee, Sedlitzer See, Partwitzer See, Geierswalder See, Neuwieser See, Blunoer Südsee, Sabrodter See, Bergener See and Spreetaler See
- in the south: the Bernsteinsee, Scheibesee, Dreiweiberner See, Speicherbecken Lohse II, Silbersee/Mortkasee, Knappensee and Graureihersee.

These are not the only artificial lakes that have been and will be created in eastern Germany. Around the city of Leipzig, a new lake district called the Central German Lake District is being developed, and there are other examples, such as the Bärwalder See and Berzdorfer See near the city of Görlitz in Upper Lusatia, or the Cottbuser Ostsee near Cottbus.

== See also ==
- Central German Lake District of similar origins
