= Hammergraben =

River in Germany

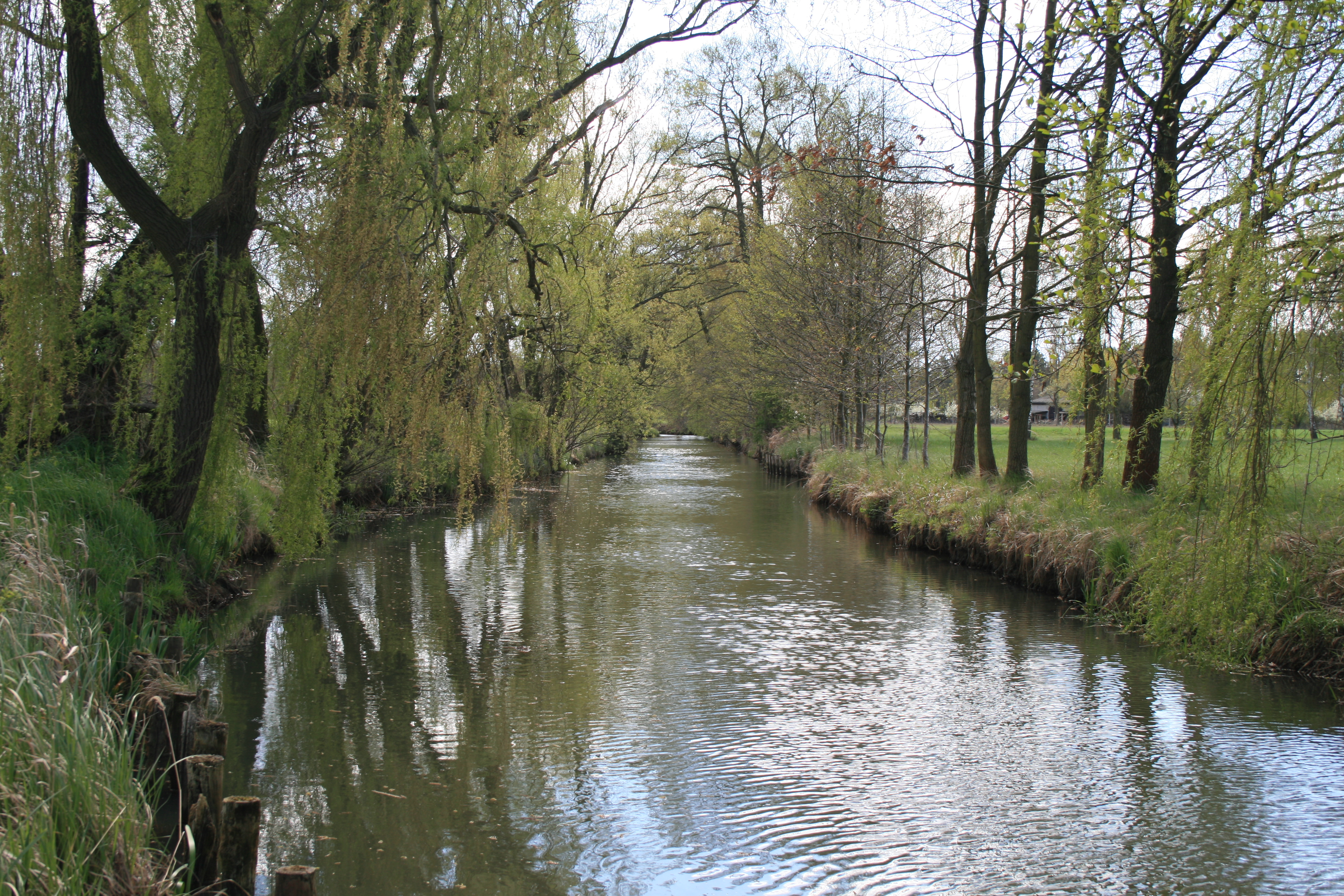

Location
- Country: Germany
- States: Brandenburg

Physical characteristics
- Mouth
  - location: Großes Fließ
  - coordinates: 51.8544°N 14.2608°E

Basin features
- Progression: Großes Fließ→ Spree→ Havel→ Elbe→ North Sea

Hammergraben is a river of Brandenburg, Germany. It branches off the Spree in Cottbus, and flows into the Großes Fließ (a tributary of the Spree) in Schmogrow-Fehrow. It is used to flood Cottbuser Ostsee, a former open pit lignite mine, which is planned to become Germany's largest artificial lake by surface area.

== See also ==
- List of rivers of Brandenburg
