= Cottbuser Ostsee =

Artificial lake in Germany

Coordinates: 51.786°N 14.417°E

Cottbus Eastern Lake
- Location within Germany
- Location: northeast of Cottbus, Brandenburg, Germany
- Type: flooded former open pit lignite mine
- Part of: Lusatian Lake District
- Primary inflows: Hammergraben (Spree)
- Built: December 23, 2015 end of mining April 12, 2019 start of flooding
- First flooded: April 12, 2019 begin of flooding; 23 December 2024 target water level reached; December 31, 2030 end of flooding (planned)
- Surface area: 1,900 hectares (4,700 acres) (planned)
- Average depth: 2.5 to 3 metres (8 ft 2 in to 9 ft 10 in) (planned)
- Max. depth: 30 metres (98 ft) (planned)
- Water volume: 150,000,000 cubic metres (5.3×10^{9} cu ft) (planned)
- Surface elevation: 61.8 metres (203 ft) above Normalhöhennull (planned)

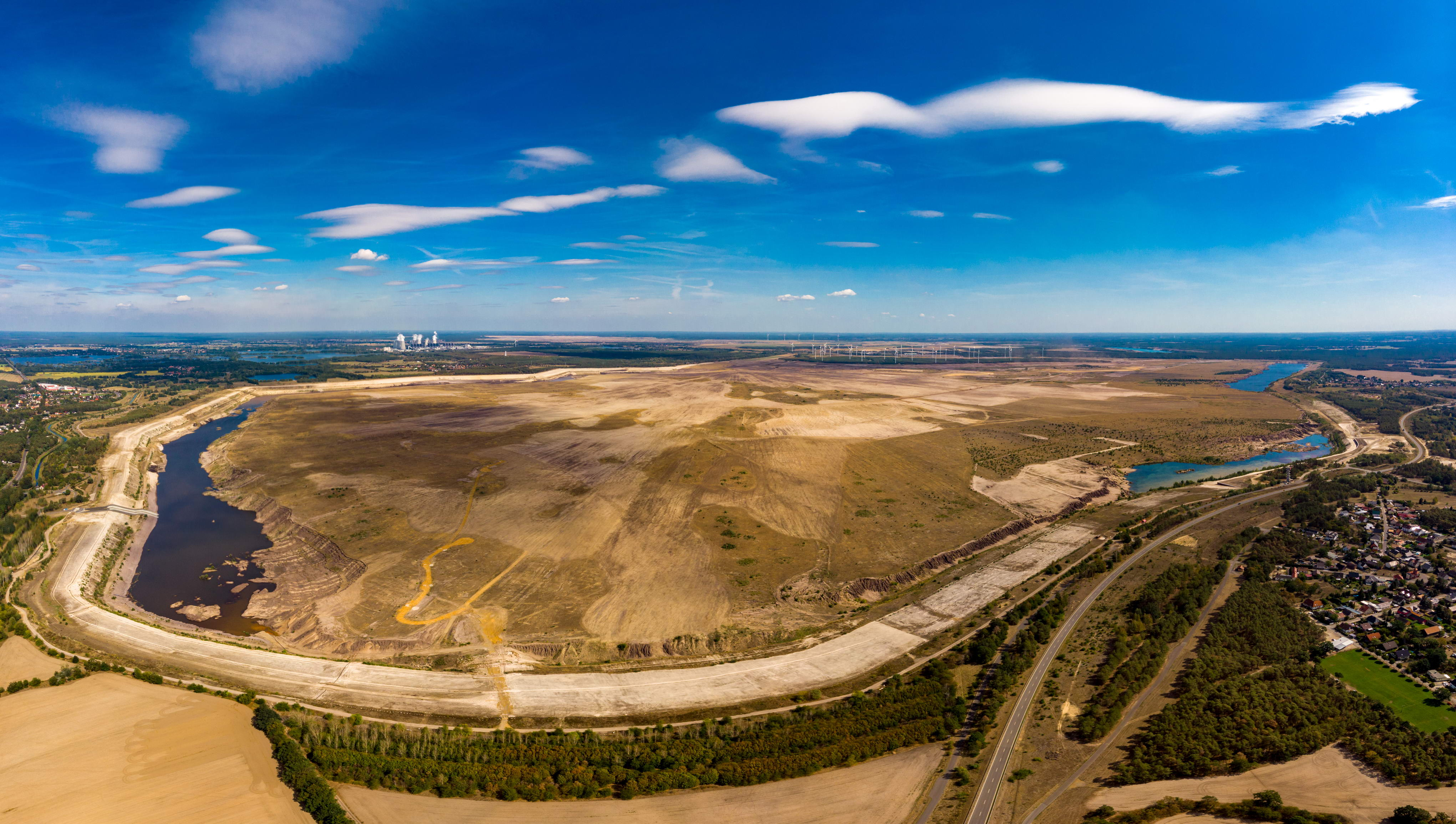
The partially flooded lake viewed from the west in September 2019

The Cottbuser Ostsee (Cottbus Eastern Lake; Lower Sorbian: Chóśebuski pódzajtšny jazor) is an artificial lake under development on the grounds of the former open-pit lignite mine de:Tagebau Cottbus Nord near Cottbus, Brandenburg, Germany.

== Dimensions ==
When complete, it is to cover a surface area of 19 km^{2} (7.3 sq mi), making it one of the biggest artificial lakes in the country. At a maximum depth of 30 metres (100 ft) and an average depth of between 2.5 metres (8 ft 2 in) and 3 metres (10 ft) the lake is to have a total water volume of 0.150 cubic kilometres (0.036 cu mi) once flooding is complete. Until the lake is complete, the biggest artificial lake in Germany by surface area (likewise created by conversion of a former lignite mine) is Geiseltalsee which covers some 1,840 hectares (4,500 acres). However, the water volume of Geiseltalsee is almost three times larger at 0.423 cubic kilometres (0.101 cu mi). For comparison, Germany's largest lake, Lake Constance, covers 536 square kilometres (207 sq mi) at a depth of up to 251 metres (823 ft) and contains some 48 cubic kilometres (12 cu mi) of water. The largest reservoir (i.e. an artificial lake created via a dam) in Germany by surface area is Forggensee in Bavaria with a surface area of 15.2 square kilometres (5.9 sq mi) and a maximum water volume of 0.168 cubic kilometres (0.040 cu mi). However, this lake is reduced to a "rump" of 3.2 square kilometres (1.2 sq mi) surface area in winter.

== History ==
The lake covers what used to be the open pit lignite mine "Tagebau Cotbus Nord" which produced a total of 220 megatonnes (220,000,000 long tons; 240,000,000 short tons) of coal during its operation from 1981 to 2015. The last coal was mined in December 2015 and subsequently work began on converting the mine into a lake. Flooding started in 2019 but had to be interrupted several times due to low water levels in the nearby Spree River. The lake is to become part of the Lusatian Lake District, a chain of artificial lakes mostly the result of open-pit lignite mining.

== Name ==
The name – besides referring to the location of the lake to the East of central Cottbus – can be interpreted as a pun on the German name for the Baltic Sea, which is called "Ostsee" in German, the two words only being distinguished by their grammatical gender: "See" meaning "sea" in German is grammatically feminine, whereas "See" meaning "lake" in German is grammatically masculine.
