= Bergheider See =

Lake in Elbe-Elster, Germany

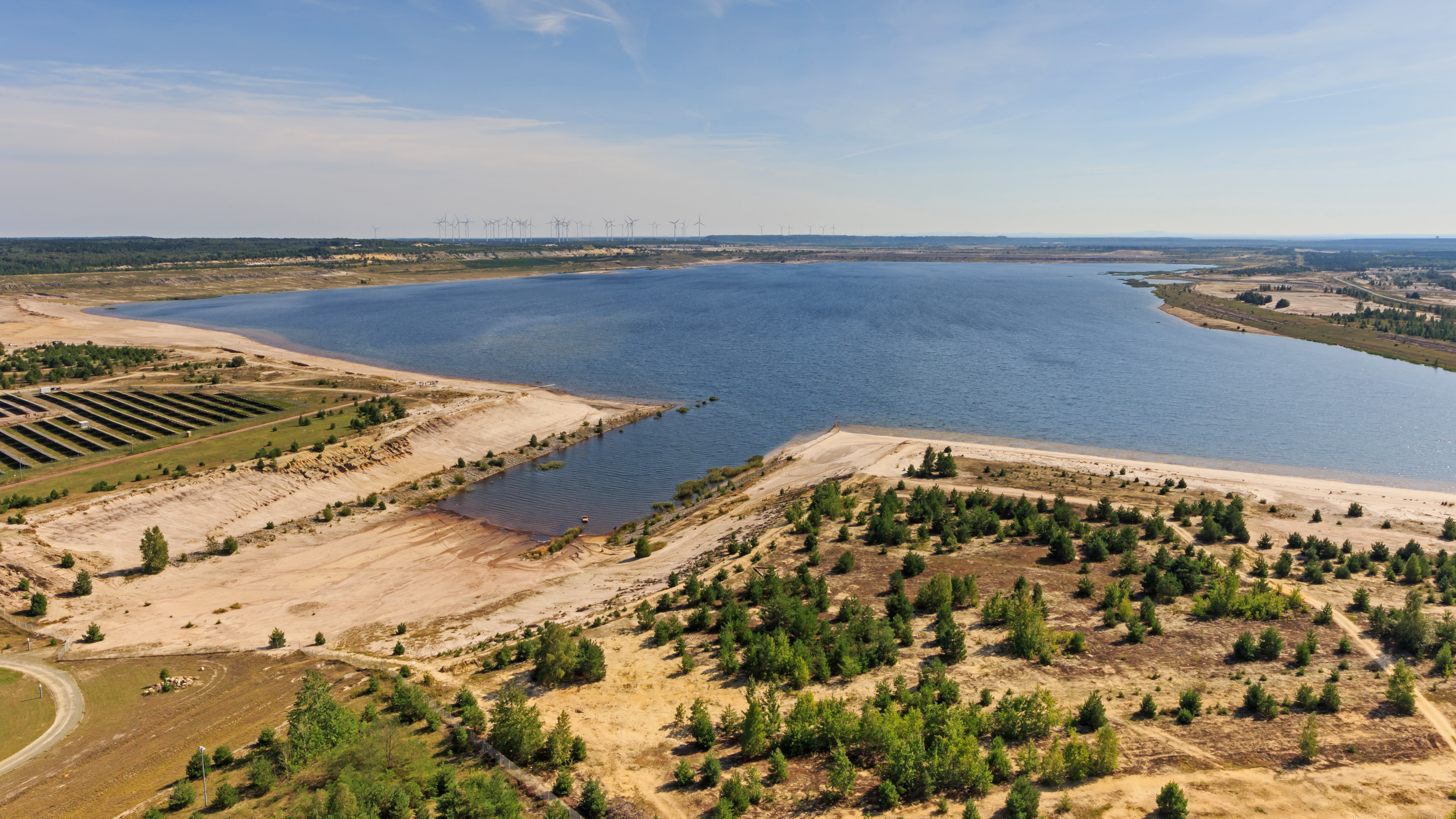
- Bergheider See (2015)

- Location within Brandenburg Location within Germany
- Location: Elbe-Elster, Germany
- Coordinates: 51°34′17″N 13°47′24″E
- Part of: Lusatian Lake District
- First flooded: September 2001 - May 2014
- Surface area: 320 ha (3.2 km^{2}; 1.2 sq mi)

The Bergheider See (Lower Sorbian: Bergheidski jazor), south of Finsterwalde near Lichterfeld in the county of Elbe-Elster in Germany, is a flooded pit from the former open cast mine of Klettwitz-Nord, northeast of the Lower Lusatian Heath. The lake was named after the old village of Bergheide, which had to be abandoned for the brown coal pit.

The flooding of the pit, under the direction of the LMBV company in charge of dealing with the consequences of lignite mining, began in September 2001 and ended in May 2014. The lake is part of the Lusatian Lake District, but is isolated from the Lusatian Lake Chain as it is 20 km (12 mi) away from the waterways linking the other lakes. The Bergheider See has a surface area of about 320 ha (3.2 km^{2}; 1.2 sq mi). On the Lichterfeld shore (north shore) are bathing facilities. The other shores have been designated as Nature Preserves. There are also restricted areas belonging to the LMBV (Lausitzer Mitteldeutsche Bergbau Verwaltungsgesellschaft = Lusatian Central German Mining Administration Company).

In 2002, the F60 Visitor Mine opened on the northern shore of the lake. The show mine has the largest movable piece of mining equipment in the world, 502 m (1,647 ft) long. It has been made accessible for visitors. At the top it is 75 m (246 ft) above the bottom. Together with the show mine, the lake is being converted into a recreation area with floating houses, a water sports centre and a holiday home park. The terrain is being used to stage events. The starting project for the scheme was the International Construction Exhibition of Prince Pückler Land from 2000 to 2010.

The newly renovated Landstraße L 60 from Lichterfeld to Lauchhammer, which runs past the Bergheider See, was closed in summer 2010 but reopened in December 2015.

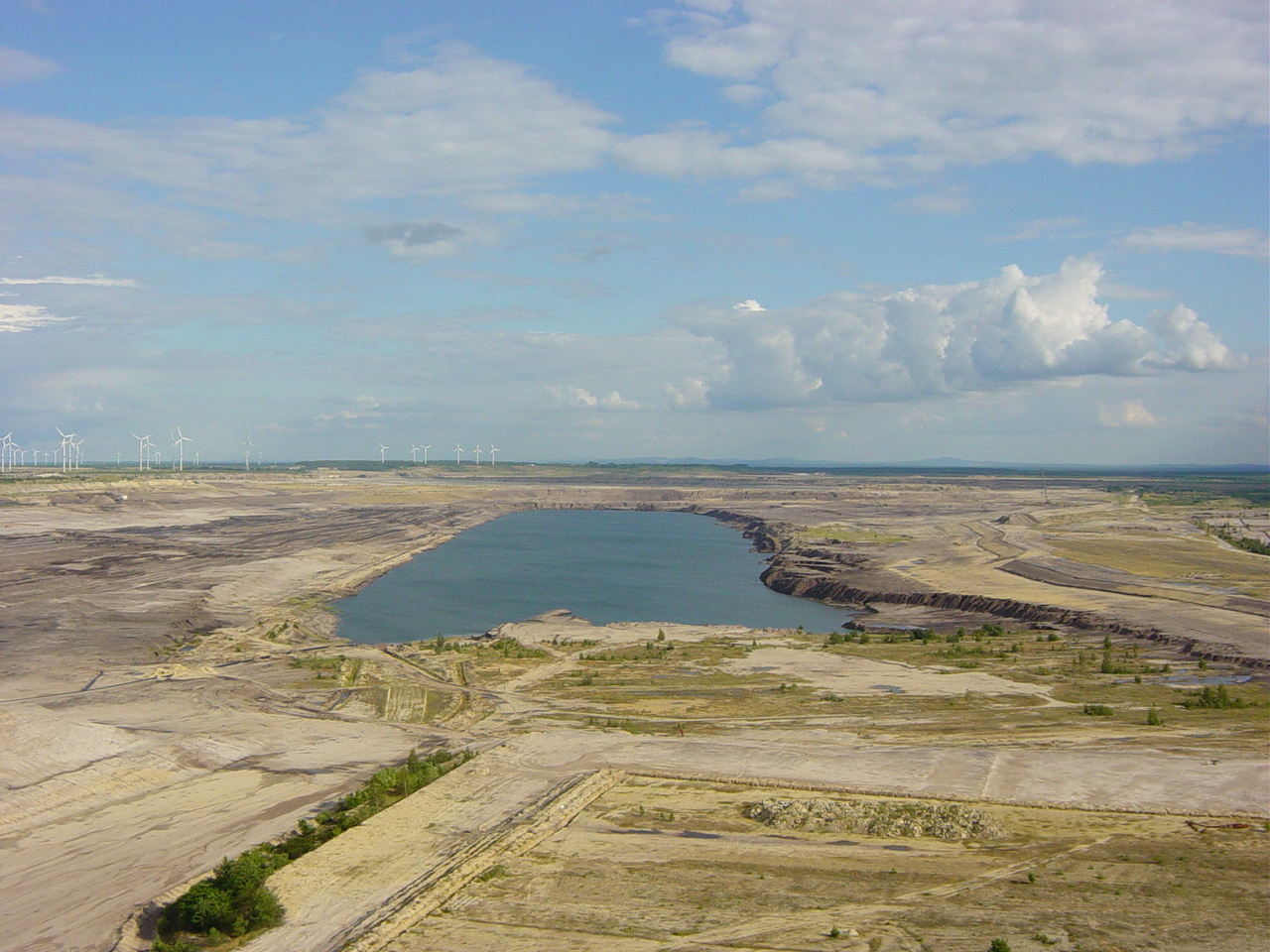
The Bergheider See, the Klettwitz wind park and, in the distance, the Lusatian Mountains (2004)

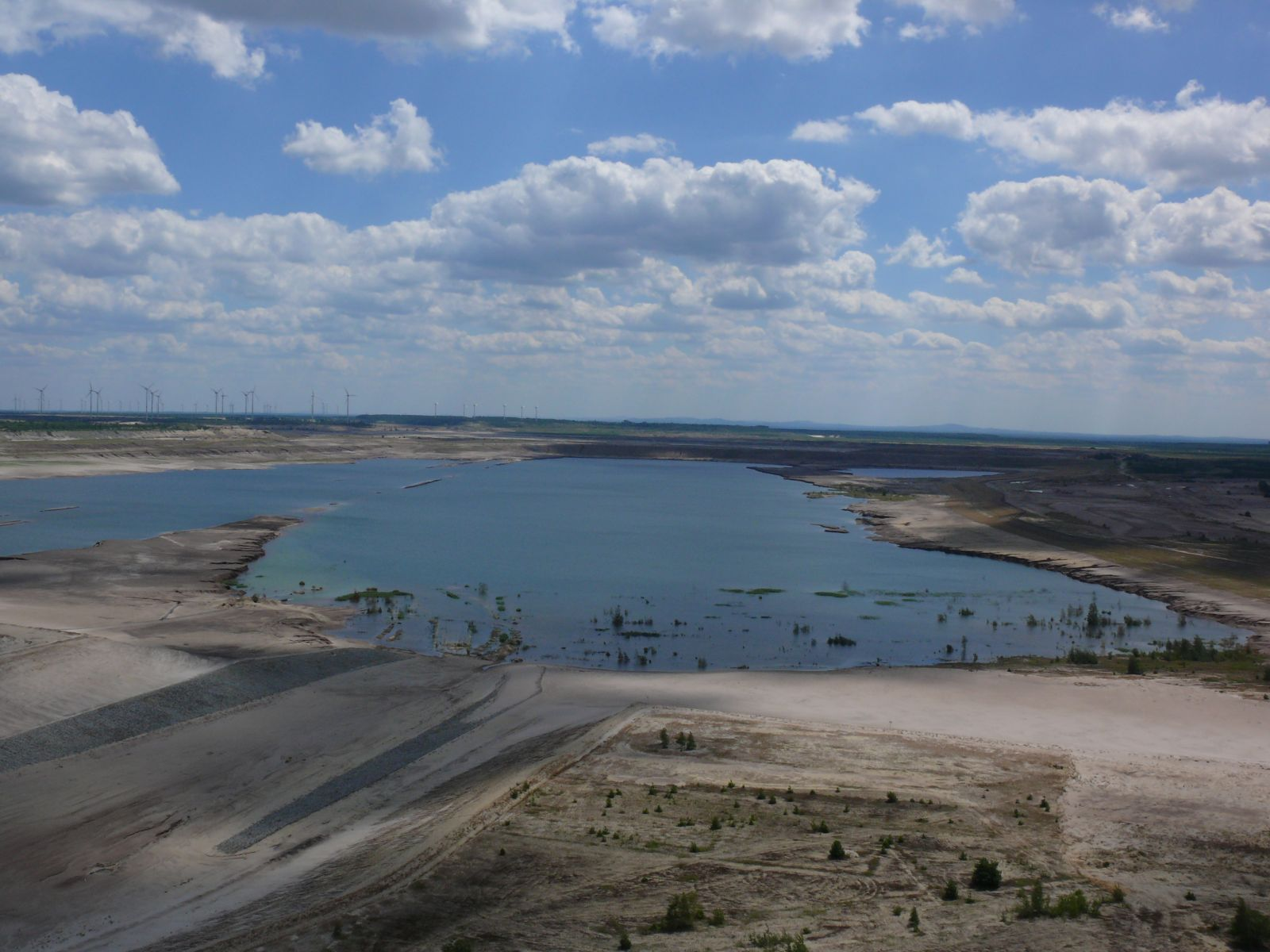
View of the F60 Visitor Mine by the clearly larger lake (2007)

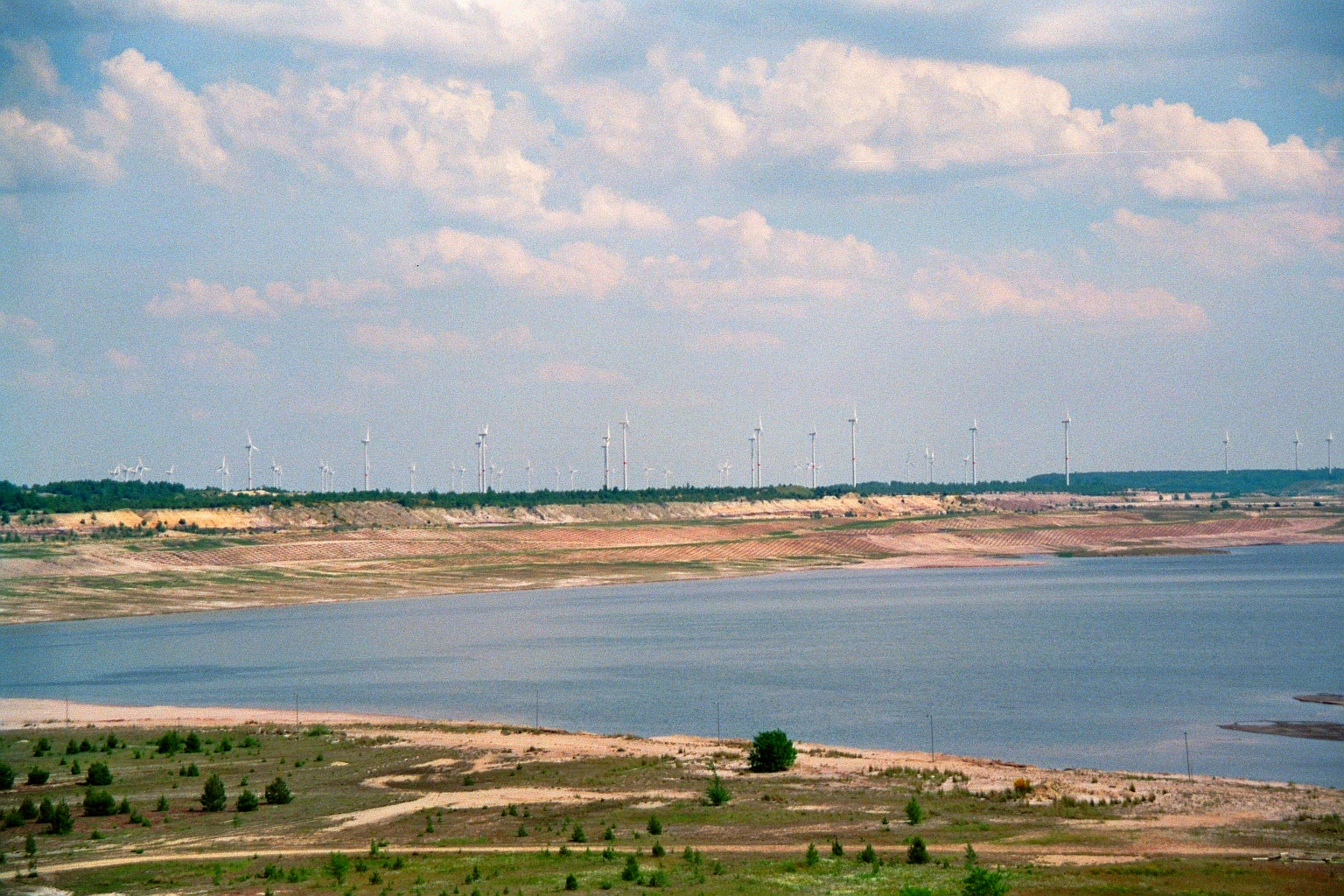
Three years later the shore zone began to fill up (2010)
