= Graureihersee =

Lake in Germany

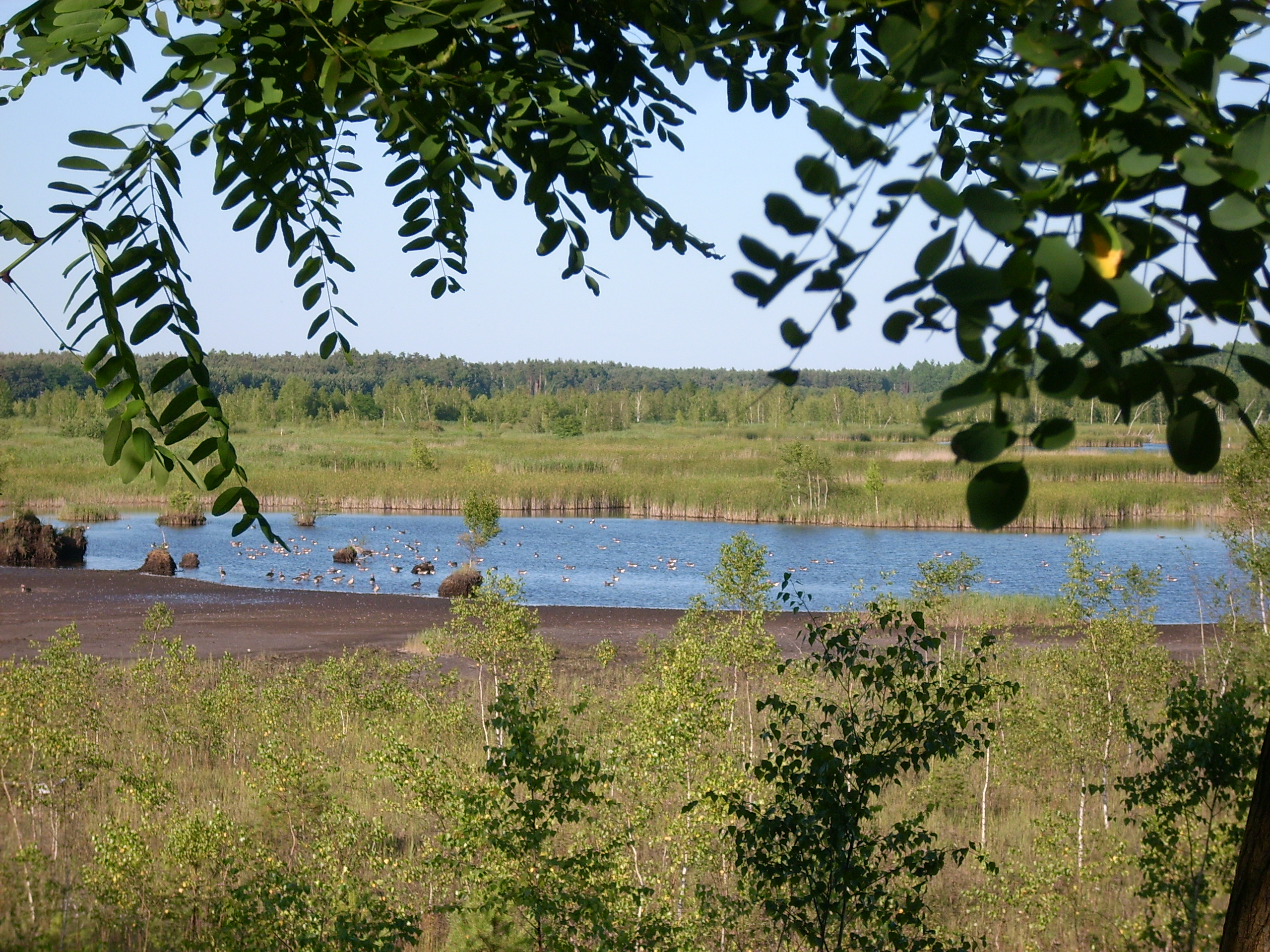
- Graureihersee 2

- Location within Saxony
- Location: Saxony
- Coordinates: 51°23′35″N 14°20′3″E
- Basin countries: Germany
- Surface area: 1.37 km^{2} (0.53 sq mi)
- Max. depth: 25 m (82 ft)
- Water volume: 3,000,000 m^{3} (110,000,000 cu ft)
- Settlements: Hoyerswerda

Graureihersee (translates to Grey Heron Lake in English) is a lake in Saxony, Germany. It is a part of the Lusatian Lake District. Its surface area is 1.37km² (0.53 mi^{2}) and it's water pH is 6.5. Over 330 grey heron pairs have been identified since 1995.

== Origin ==
In 1945, the Werminghoff I open-pit mine closed. Until the late 1990s, residual pits D and F from the mine were used for industrial settling basin purposes and deposition of ash, coal slurry, slag, and industrial/household waste. Among other factors, rising groundwater level created two bodies of water in residual pits D and F. In 1970, the two residual pits were denominated a protected site. Landslides in 1996–97 damaged floating islands and collapsed the dam between the two residual pits and created combined body of water.

== History ==
In 2000, the local council named the basin Graureihersee, after gray heron colonies there since 1995. Controlled flooding into the lake concluded 2004.
