= Senftenberg =

Senftenberg Zły Komorow
- Town
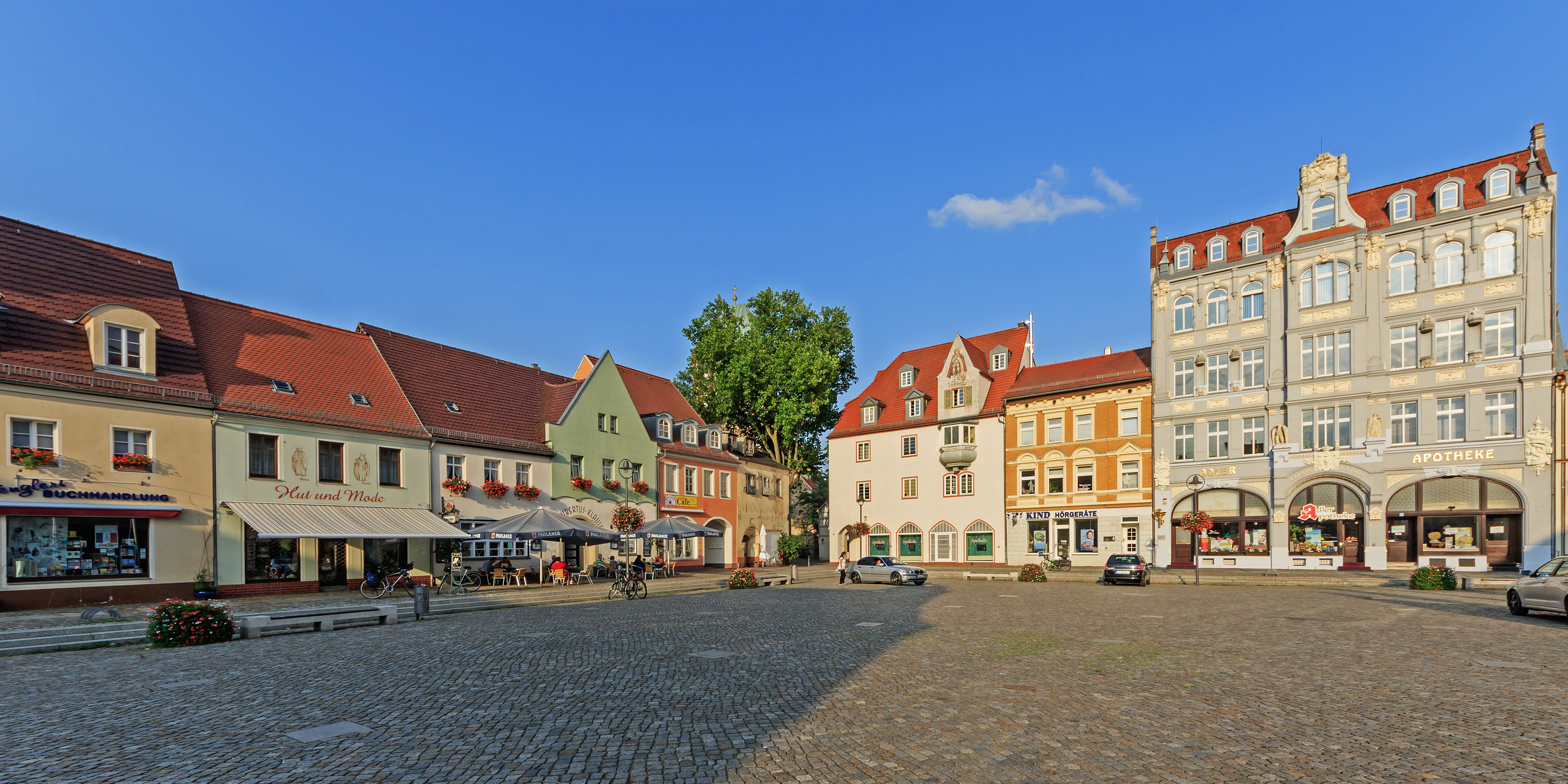
- Market Square

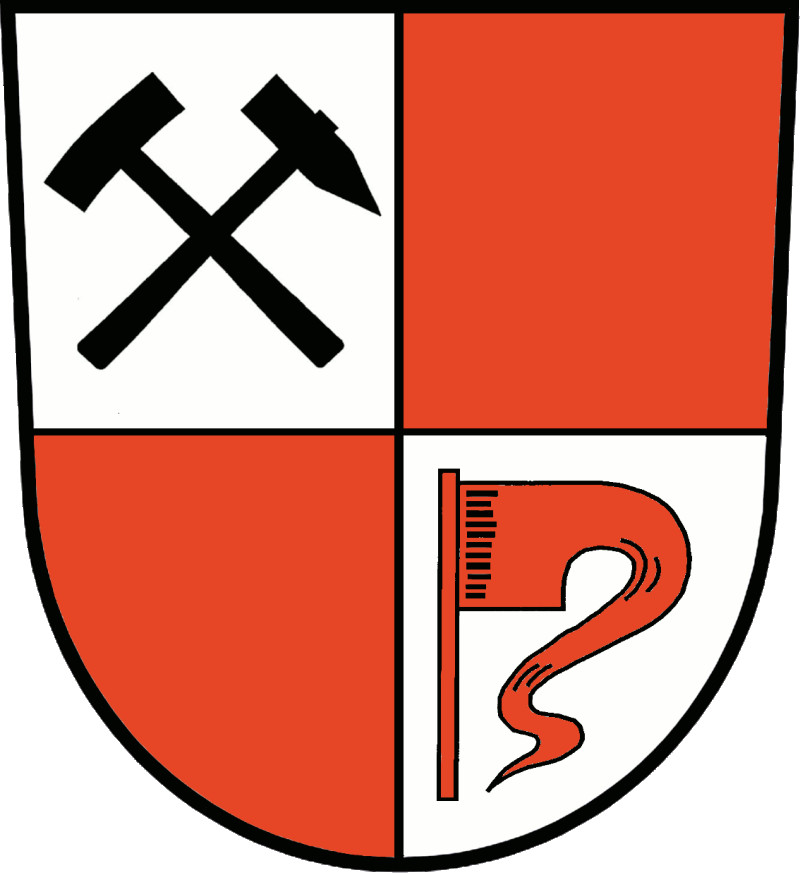
- Coat of arms

- Location of Senftenberg; Zły Komorow within Oberspreewald-Lausitz district
- Interactive map of Senftenberg; Zły Komorow
- Location within Germany Location within Brandenburg
- Coordinates: 51°31′N 14°01′E
- Country: Germany
- State: Brandenburg
- District: Oberspreewald-Lausitz

Government
  - Mayor (2022–30): Andreas Pfeiffer (CDU)

Area
  - Total: 127.56 km^{2} (49.25 sq mi)
- Elevation: 102 m (335 ft)

Population (2025-12-31)
  - Total: 23,147
  - Density: 181.46/km^{2} (469.98/sq mi)
- Demonym(s): German: Senftenberger; Lower Sorbian: Złykomorojski (m.), Złykomorojska (f.)
- Time zone: UTC+01:00 (CET)
  - Summer (DST): UTC+02:00 (CEST)
- Postal codes: 01945 (Peickwitz), 01968 (Brieske, Großkoschen, Niemtsch, Sedlitz, Senftenberg), 01996 (Hosena)
- Dialling codes: 03573, 035756 (Hosena, Peickwitz)
- Vehicle registration: OSL, CA, SFB
- Website: www.senftenberg.de

Senftenberg (German, pronounced [ˈzɛnftn̩ˌbɛʁk]) or Zły Komorow (Lower Sorbian, pronounced [ˈzwɨ ˈkɔmɔrɔw]) is a town in Lower Lusatia, Brandenburg, in eastern Germany, capital of the Oberspreewald-Lausitz district.

== Geography ==
Senftenberg is located in the southwest of the historic Lower Lusatia region at the border with Saxony. Its town centre is situated north of the river Black Elster and the artificial Senftenberger Lake, part of the Lusatian Lake District chain, approximately 20 kilometres (12 mi) northwest of Hoyerswerda, and 35 kilometres (22 mi) southwest of Cottbus.

Senftenberg station is north of the centre and a major railway freight yard is located to its north-east, with a locomotive depot.

== History ==
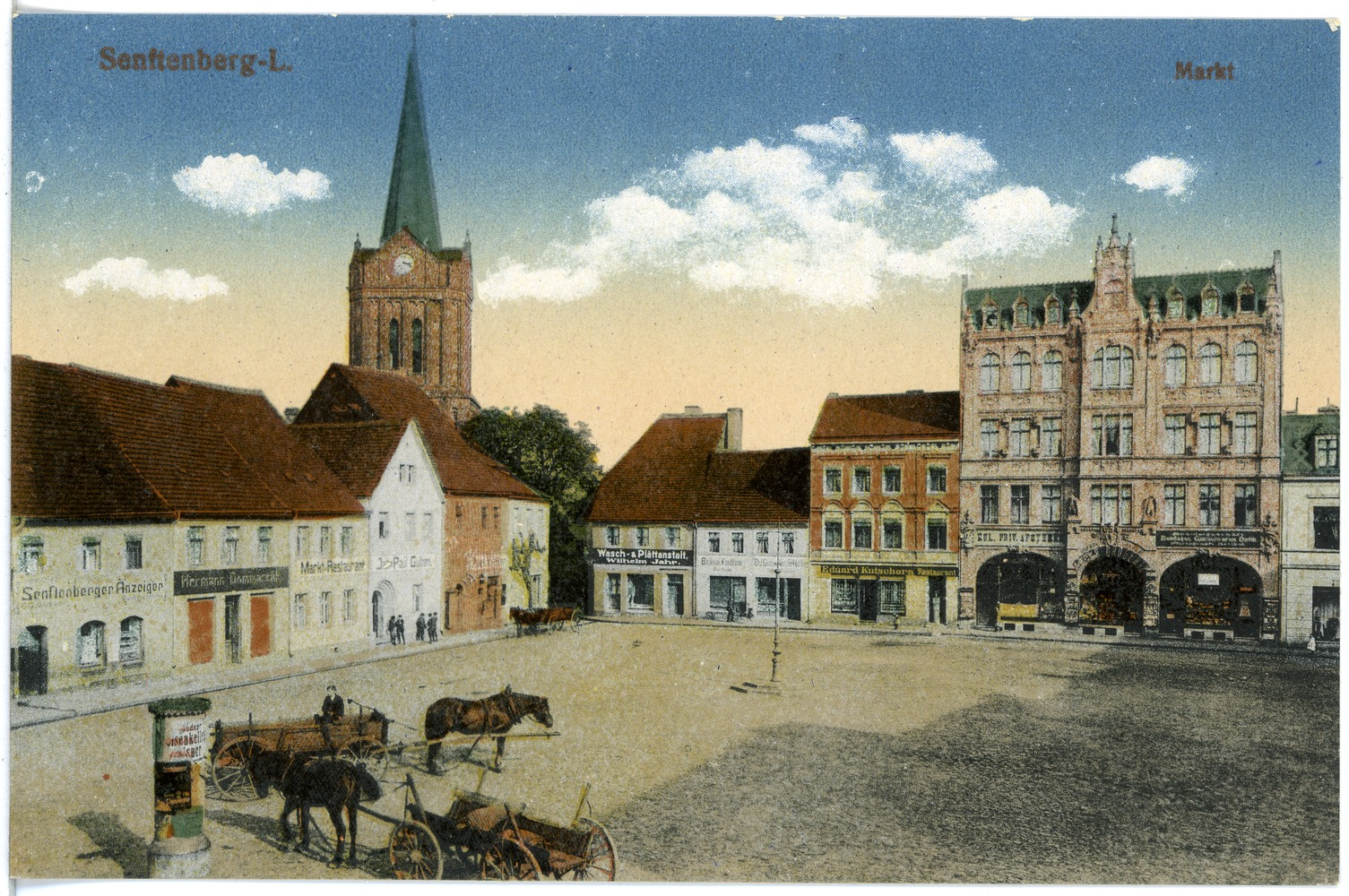
Main square in the early 20th century

Senftenberg was first mentioned in a 1279 deed issued by Henry III the Illustrious of Wettin, then margrave of Lusatia. In 1319, the town became part of the Duchy of Jawor, the southwesternmost duchy of fragmented Piast-ruled Poland. In 1346 it passed to the Bohemia, then in 1350 to the Margraviate of Brandenburg. With Lower Lusatia, the settlement was re-acquired by the Kingdom of Bohemia under Charles IV of Luxembourg in 1368. The town was located on a trade route connecting Leipzig with Poland. Elector Frederick II of Saxony acquired Senftenberg in 1448, whereafter the area as a border stronghold of the House of Wettin was separated from Bohemian Lusatia, until in 1635 all Lusatian territories fell to Saxony by the Peace of Prague.

During the Great Northern War, in 1701, troops marched through the town towards Poland. In 1704, the defensive walls were strengthened against a possible Swedish attack. According to the 1815 Congress of Vienna, Lower Lusatia was annexed by Prussia and incorporated into the Province of Brandenburg. During World War II, the present-day district of Großkoschen (Kóšyna) was the location of a subcamp of the Gross-Rosen concentration camp, in which some 850 men, including Soviet citizens and Poles, were imprisoned. From 1952 to 1990, it was part of the Bezirk Cottbus of East Germany.

== Names ==
- Czech: Zlý Komorov
- German: Senftenberg
- Lower Sorbian: Zły Komorow
- Polish: Zły Komorów
- Upper Sorbian: Zły Komorow

== Lake Senftenberg ==
Lake Senftenberg is a popular tourist destination. In 1973, the former open cast mine, was officially opened to the public. Today, the lake is known for its excellent water quality. It is part of the so-called Lusatian Lakeland, a group of 23 artificial lakes.

== Demography ==
After the second half of the 19th century the inhabitants increased because of workers coming to Senftenberg to work in the coal mines. After the German Reunion, many inhabitants moved to the western part of Germany.

Development of Population since 1875 within the Current Boundaries (Blue Line: Population; Dotted Line: Comparison to Population Development of Brandenburg state; Grey Background: Time of Nazi rule; Red Background: Time of Communist rule)

Recent Population Development and Projections (Population Development before Census 2011 (blue line); Recent Population Development according to the Census in Germany in 2011 (blue bordered line); Official projections for 2005–2030 (yellow line); for 2017–2030 (scarlet line); for 2020–2030 (green line)

Senftenberg: Population development
within the current boundaries (2020)

Year	Pop.	±% p.a.
1875	6,972	—
1890	10,536	+2.79%
1910	24,024	+4.21%
1925	30,467	+1.60%
1939	31,032	+0.13%
1950	32,419	+0.40%
1964	36,687	+0.89%

Year	Pop.	±% p.a.
1971	35,909	−0.31%
1981	39,589	+0.98%
1985	39,363	−0.14%
1990	36,894	−1.29%
1995	34,413	−1.38%
2000	31,374	−1.83%
2005	28,774	−1.72%

Year	Pop.	±% p.a.
2010	26,530	−1.61%
2015	24,625	−1.48%
2016	24,773	+0.60%
2017	24,558	−0.87%
2018	24,275	−1.15%
2019	23,895	−1.57%
2020	23,371	−2.19%

== Sport ==
In Senftenberg is the soccer club FSV Glückauf Brieske-Senftenberg. They currently play at the Elsterkampfbahn but previously played at the former Glück-Auf Stadium (known as the Old Stadium). It opened on 4 November 1953, when 33,000 fans showed up for the inaugural match against Torpedo Moscow. It also hosted motorcycle speedway and was the venue for a qualifying round of the 1966 Speedway World Team Cup. The old stadium on Briesker Straße was torn down in 1997 and is marked by the housing on the "Im alten Stadion" road.

== Twin towns – sister cities ==
Senftenberg is twinned with:

- Fresagrandinaria, Italy
- Nowa Sól, Poland
- Püttlingen, Germany
- Saint-Michel-sur-Orge, France
- Senftenberg, Austria
- Veszprém, Hungary
- Žamberk, Czech Republic

== Notable people ==
- Hermann Kuhnt (1850–1925), ophthalmologist
- Herbert Windt (1894–1965), composer
- Joachim Sauer (born 1949), chemist and professor

== Gallery ==
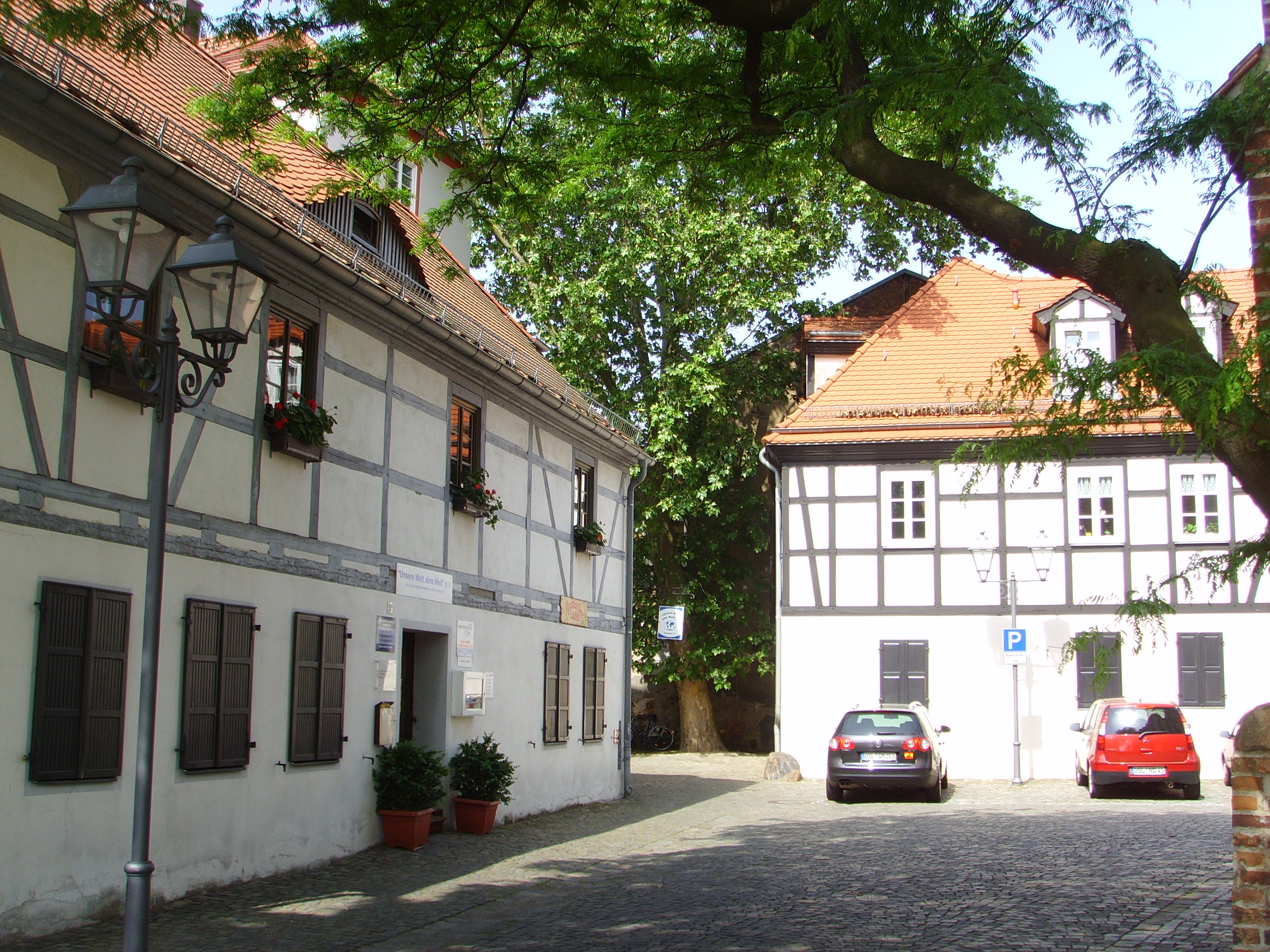
Old Town

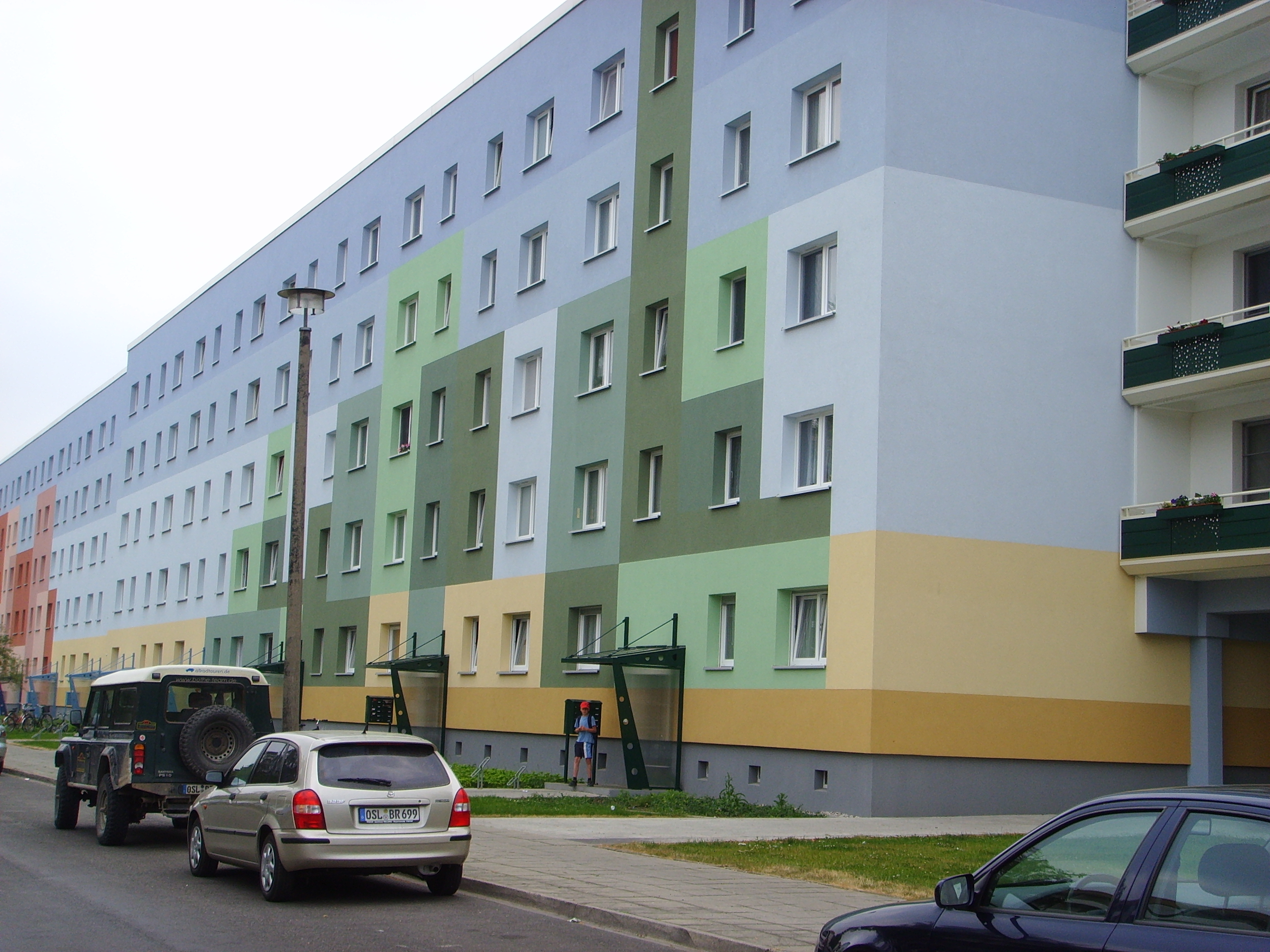
Estate housing

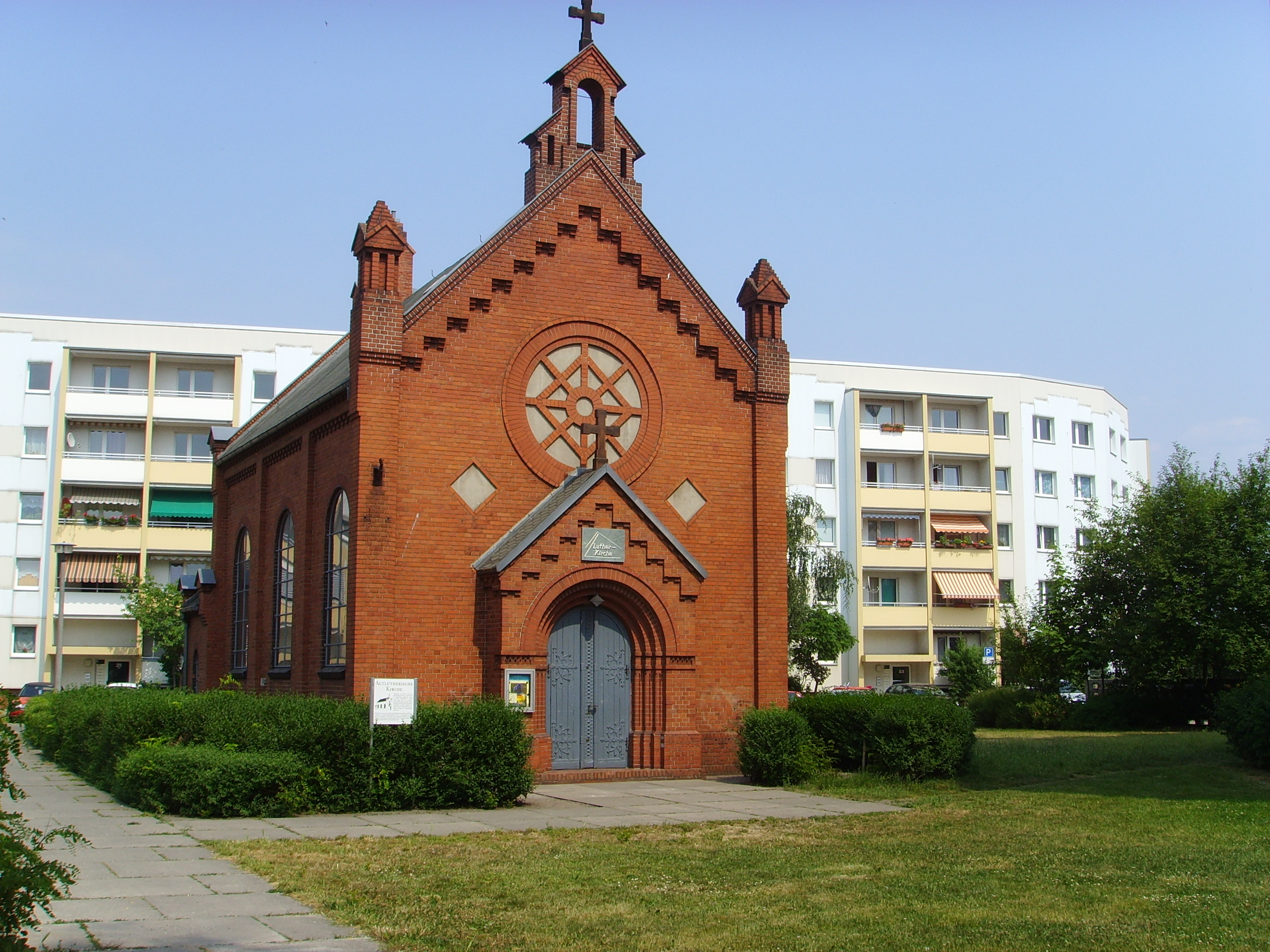
Lutheran church
in "Jüttendorf"

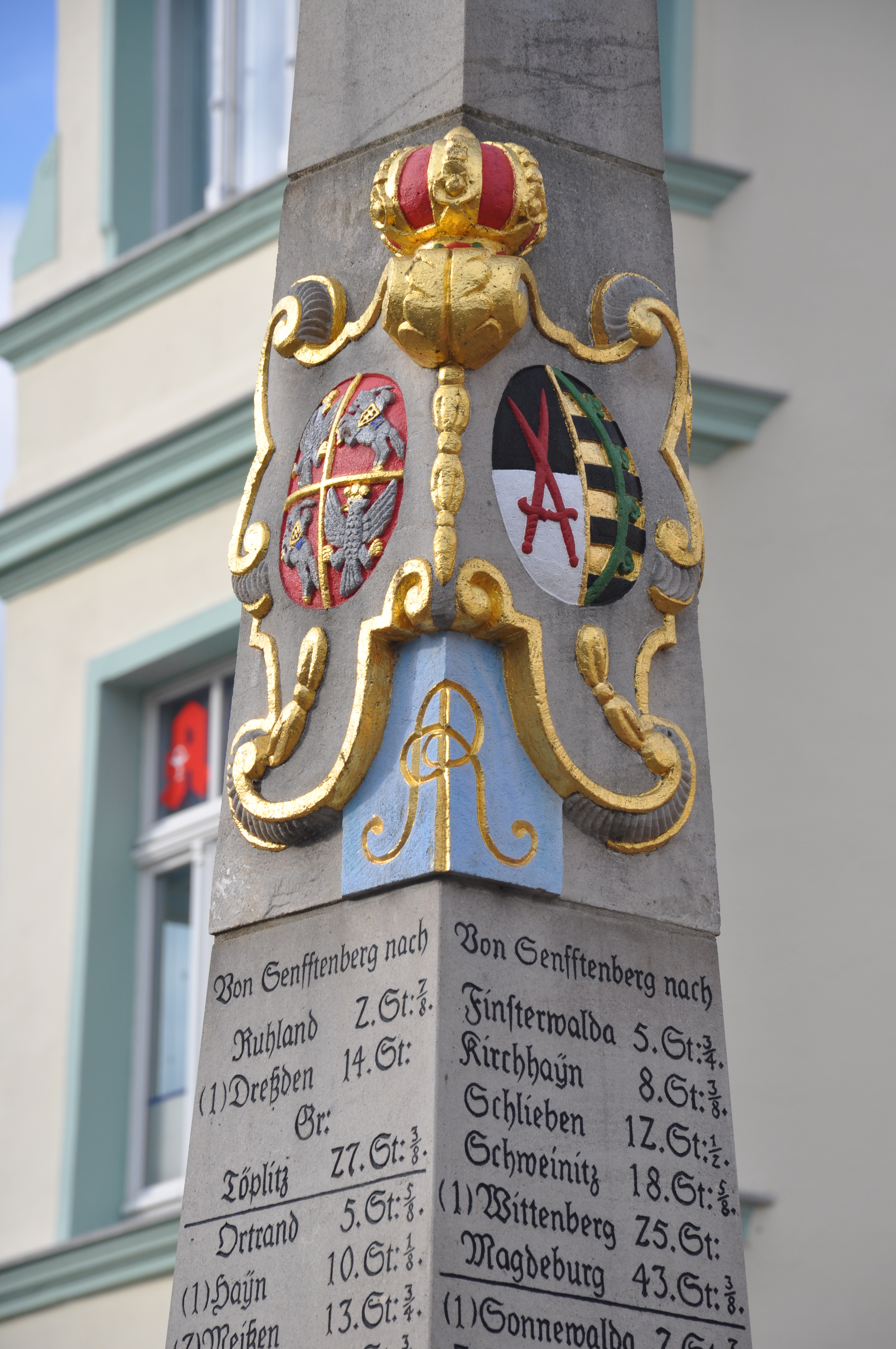
Coats of Arms of Poland and Saxony on a postal milestone
