= Joachim Sauer =

German chemist, professor emeritus and husband of Angela Merkel (born 1949)

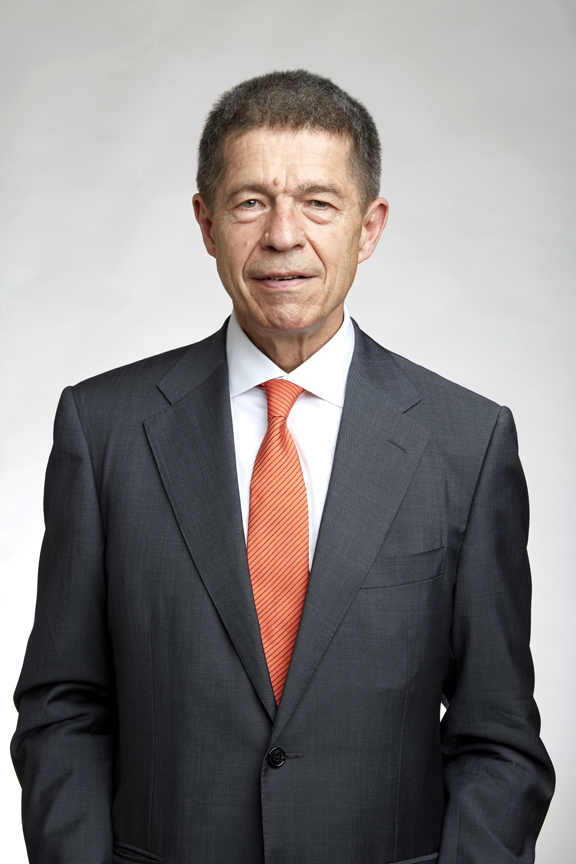
- Sauer at the Royal Society admissions day in London, July 2018
- Born: 19 April 1949 (age 77); Hosena, Saxony, Germany
- Spouse: Angela Merkel (m. 1998)
- Children: 2
- Awards: Foreign Member of the Royal Society (2018)
- Scientific career
- Fields: Quantum chemistry
- Workplaces: Humboldt University of Berlin
- Website: www.chemie.hu-berlin.de/de/forschung/quantenchemie/Group/js-1

Joachim Sauer ForMemRS (German pronunciation: [ˈjoːaxɪm ˈzaʊɐ]; born 19 April 1949) is a German quantum chemist and professor emeritus of physical and theoretical chemistry at the Humboldt University of Berlin. He is the husband of the former chancellor of Germany, Angela Merkel. He is one of the seven members of the board of trustees of the Friede Springer Foundation, formerly together with since deceased former German president Horst Köhler and others.

== Education and early life ==
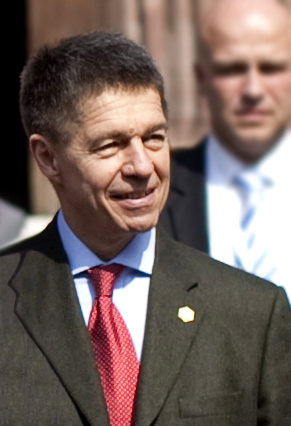
Sauer in 2009

Joachim Sauer was born in Hosena, a small town in the marshy Lusatian countryside between Dresden and Cottbus. He grew up with his twin sister and an elder brother. His father, Richard Sauer, had trained as a confectioner, but worked as an insurance representative. Sauer excelled at school.

== Career and research ==
Sauer studied chemistry from 1967 to 1972 at the Humboldt University of Berlin and was awarded a doctorate in chemistry in 1974. He continued to do research there until 1977, when he joined the Academy of Sciences, Central Institute of Physical Chemistry in Berlin, one of the leading scientific institutes of the former GDR (East Germany).

For a brief time during and after the German reunification (1990–1991) he was the deputy technical director (catalysis and sorption) for BIOSYM Technologies in San Diego, California (now BIOVIA). He remained an advisor for BIOSYM until 2002.

In 1992, he joined the Max Planck Society as head of the Quantum Chemistry Group in Berlin. In 1993, he became full professor of physical and theoretical chemistry at the Humboldt University of Berlin. He retired from his chair in October 2017 and was succeeded by Martin Schütz, who died the following year. Sauer remains affiliated with the university as a senior research fellow.

He is an active research scientist in quantum chemistry and computational chemistry. His computational studies have allowed for a better understanding of the structures and activities of some catalysts such as zeolites, specifically their acid sites, as well as the interpretation of solid state NMR spectra of nucleus Si-29, and quadrupolar nuclei such as Na-23, Al-27 and O-17.

=== Awards and honours ===
- 1991: Chemistry Prize of the Göttingen Academy of Sciences and Humanities
- 1995: Member of the Berlin-Brandenburg Academy of Sciences and Humanities
- 2006: External scientific member of the Fritz Haber Institute of the Max Planck Society
- 2007: Member of the Academy of Sciences Leopoldina
- 2009: Member of the Academia Europaea
- 2010: Liebig Medal
- 2013: Honorary Doctor of Science, University College London
- 2018: Foreign Member of the Royal Society
- 2019: Schrödinger Medal

== Personal life ==
From his previous marriage to a fellow chemist, Sauer has two sons: Daniel and Adrian. On 30 December 1998, he married Angela Merkel (herself a doctor of physics who had once worked in quantum chemistry research), who later became the chairwoman of the Christian Democratic Union. Due to the fact that Merkel became the first female chancellor of Germany on 22 November 2005, Sauer also assumed a role in diplomatic protocol as third-highest ranking spouse. In German order of precedence, the chancellor is the third-highest ranking office behind the President of Germany and the President of the Bundestag.

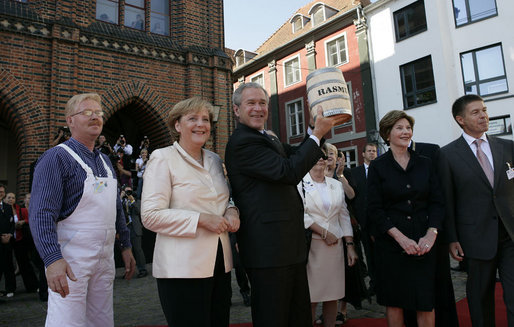
Sauer (right) with Angela Merkel, George W. Bush and Laura Bush

Because of his wife's political career, Sauer has received far more media attention than is usual for a research scientist. On several occasions, he has stated that he is not fond of this publicity.

During the 2005 election campaign Sauer kept a very low profile, declining to give any interviews not related to his scientific work. He attended the Bayreuth Festival, an opera festival and a highly visible social event in Germany, with his wife. Sauer is known as a great lover of Wagner's music.

Even during his wife's election in the Bundestag, her inauguration, and later her taking the oath of office, Sauer was not present but reportedly briefly followed the event on TV from his university chemistry lab.
