= Lake Senftenberg =

Artificial lake in Germany

Lake Senftenberg (Senftenberger See)
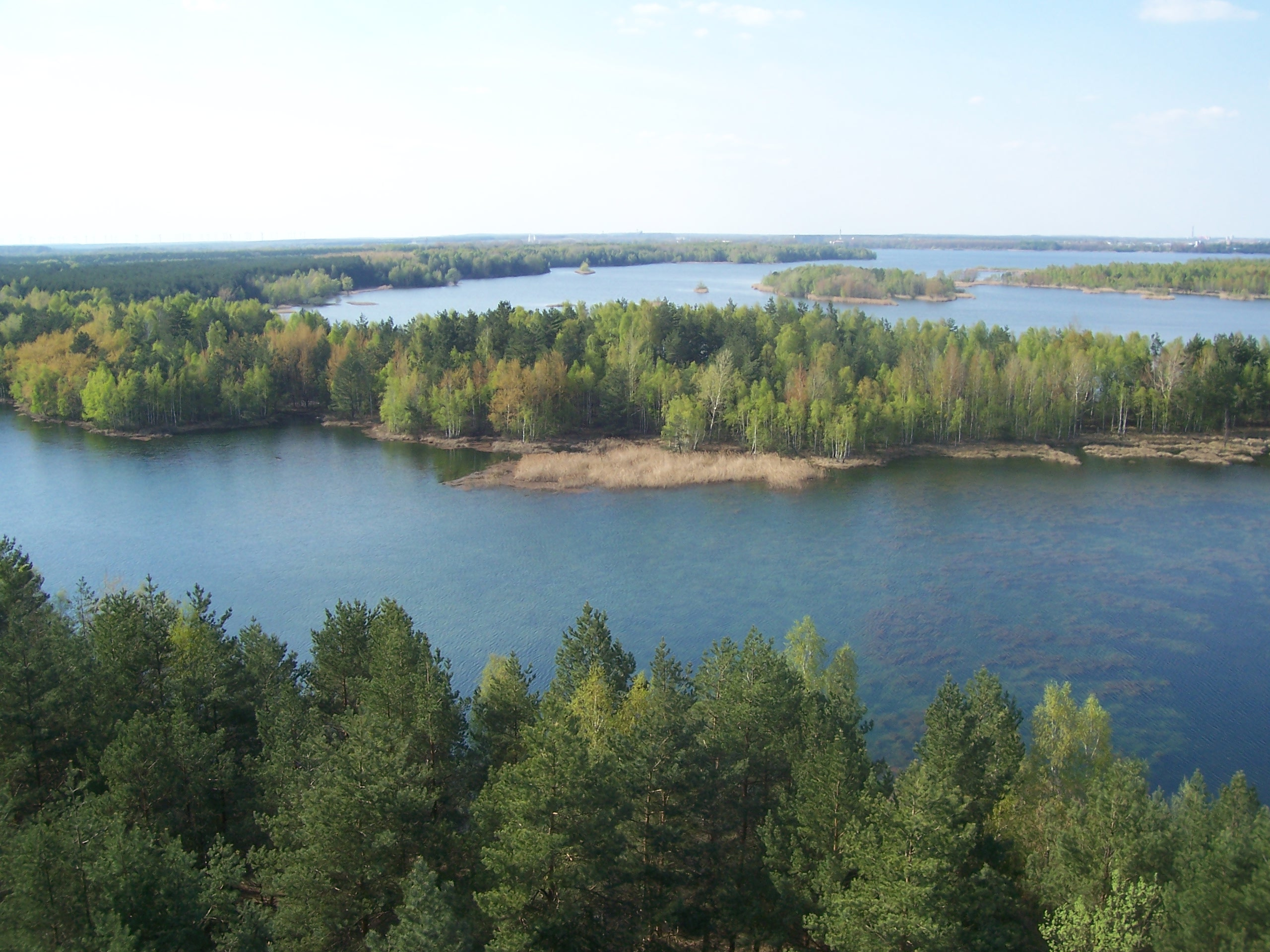

- Location within Germany Location within Brandenburg
- Location: Landkreis Oberspreewald-Lausitz, Brandenburg
- Coordinates: 51°30′0″N 14°01′0″E
- Type: Artificial lake
- Primary inflows: Black Elster
- Primary outflows: Black Elster
- Basin countries: Germany
- Surface area: 13 km^{2} (5.0 sq mi)
- Max. depth: 28 m (92 ft)
- Surface elevation: 99 m (325 ft)

Lake Senftenberg (German: Senftenberger See, formerly called Speicherbecken Niemtsch—Niemtsch reservoir, Upper Sorbian: Złykomorowski jězor, Lower Sorbian: Złykomorowski jazor) is an artificial lake in Landkreis Oberspreewald-Lausitz, Brandenburg, Germany. It is located in the Lusatian Lake District, a chain of artificial lakes. The lake is located on the border of Lower and Upper Lusatia between the southern Brandenburg city of Senftenberg and its districts Niemtsch and Großkoschen. Lake Senftenberg is one of the largest artificial lakes in Germany with an area of 1300 hectares (5 sq. mi.).

== History ==
The lake was created by the flooding of the former opencast lignite mine of Niemtsch by the Black Elster from 15 November 1967 to November 1972.

The flooding rate was initially at up to 60 cubic metres per minute (2,100 cu ft/min). To shorten the filling time, another flood channel was opened 40 metres (130 ft) away from the first channel in May 1968. Melt water and rain water meant that the flooding rate increased to up to 140 cubic metres per minute (4,900 cu ft/min).

Since the commissioning of the first beach section in 1973, the lake has enjoyed great popularity as a recreational area with holidaymakers, bathers, surfers and sailors. Of a total of 18 kilometres (11 mi) of shoreline, 7 kilometres (4.3 mi) are considered to be beaches. There are three official naturist beaches on the lake; on the north shore of the lake, at the campsite west of Großkoschen and at the "Südsee" between Peickwitz and Niemtsch.

After 1990, embankments were built on large sections, because the variable water level threatened to cause large parts of the lake edge to collapse. The depth of the lake was initially 40 metres (130 ft), but more recent measurements have found no points deeper than 25 metres (82 ft).

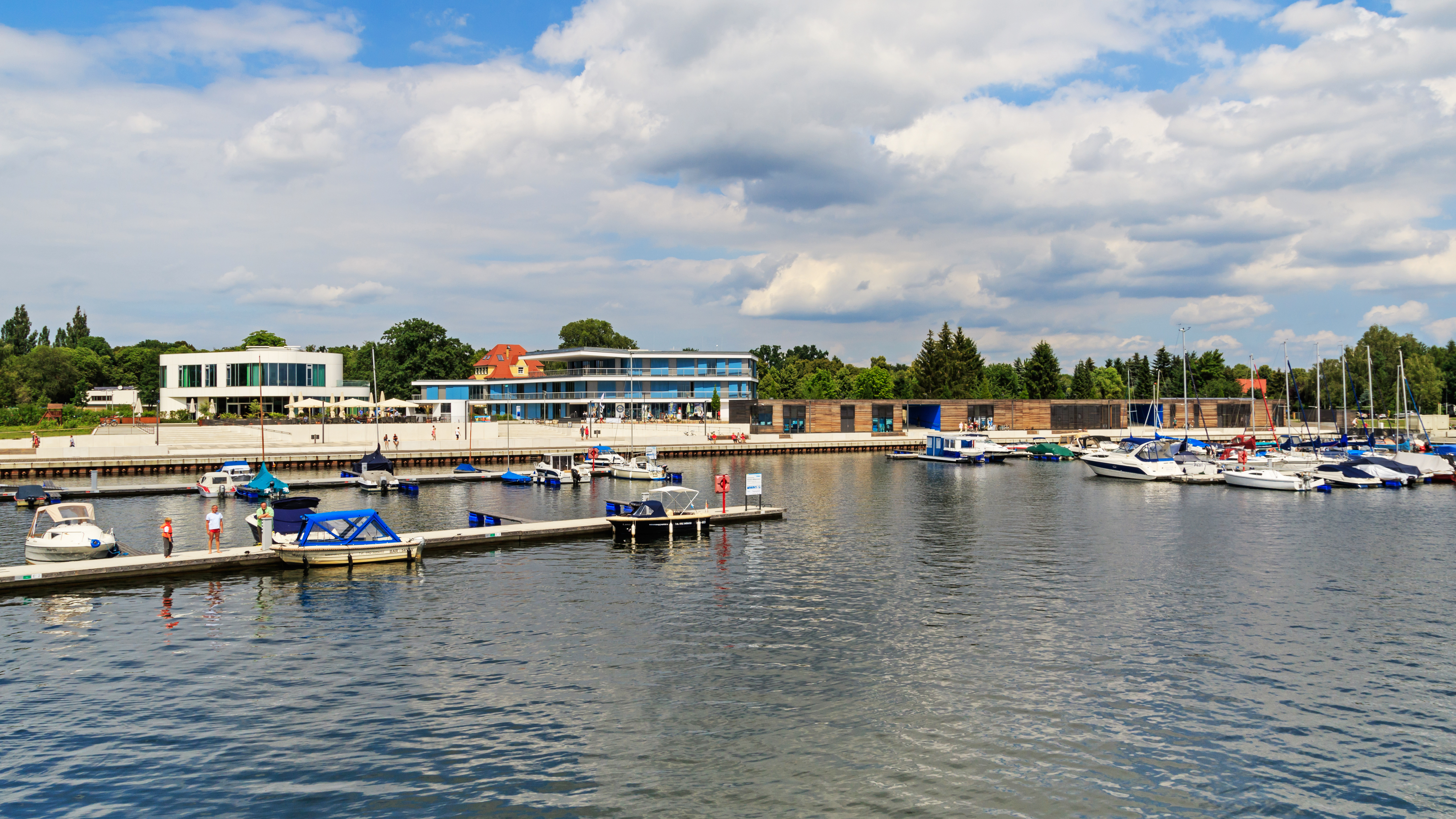
Senftenberg town harbour

From December 2010 to April 2013, a town harbour was built in Senftenberg. It was opened on 23 April 2013. It created a marina with over 100 boat moorings, an 80-metre-long (260 ft) floating pier and a harbour building. The construction costs amounted to €13 million.
