= Book Museum of the SLUB Dresden =

German literature museum

Coordinates: 51.0286°N 13.7368°E

The Book Museum of the Saxon State and University Library Dresden (full name in German: Das Buchmuseum der Sächsischen Staatsbibliothek – Landes- und Universitätsbibliothek Dresden) is a traditional literature museum in Dresden. It originated from the Cimelia Room (Zimelienzimmer) of the Royal Saxon Library.

== Location ==
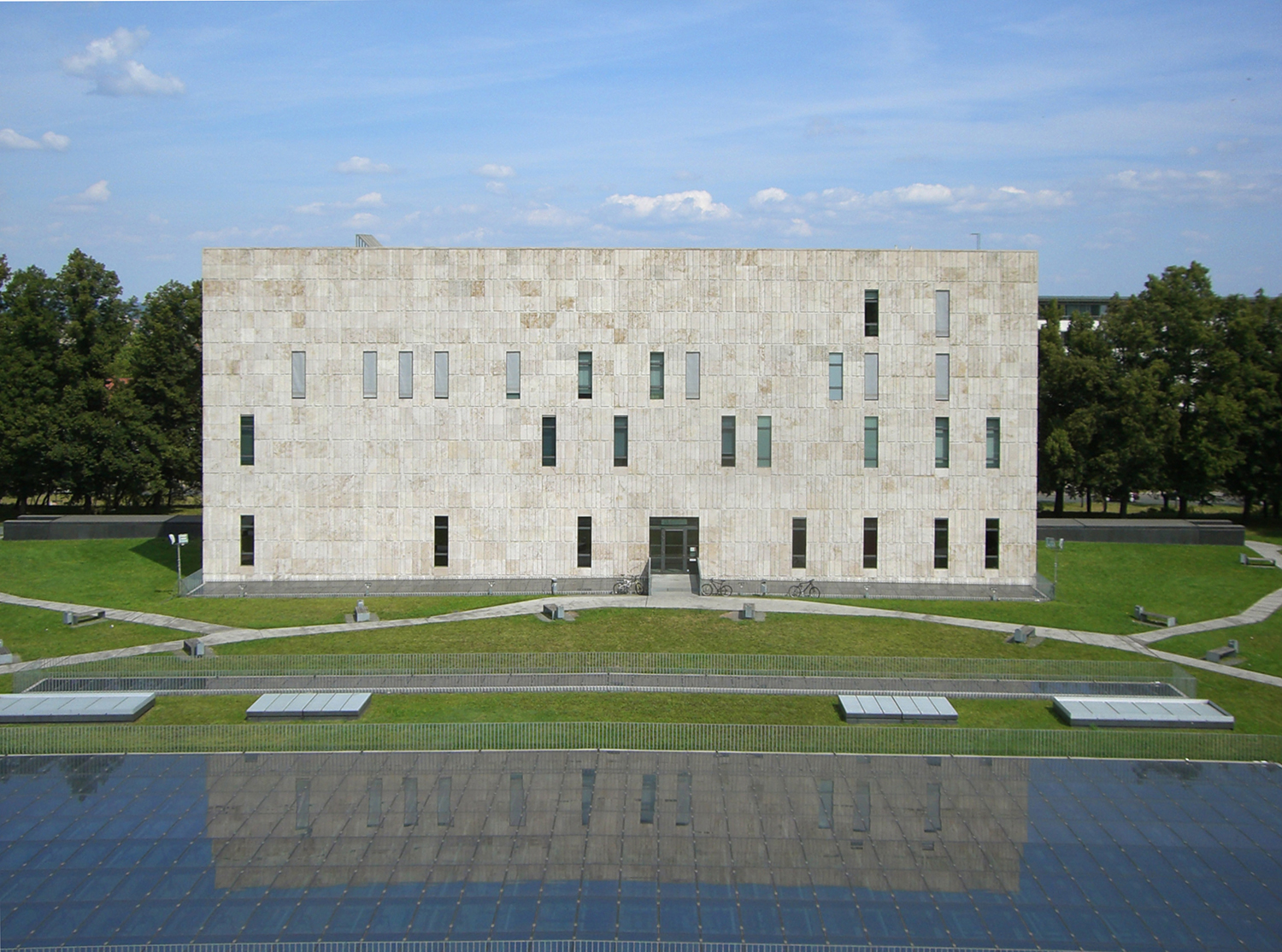
The second floor of the part of the SLUB Dresden building is home to the Book Museum.

The book museum is located in the building of the SLUB Dresden at Zellescher Weg in the district of Räcknitz. In the immediate vicinity are the Collections and Art Collections of the Dresden University of Technology and the Münchner Platz Memorial Museums.

== History ==
Since 1788, two years after its move from the Zwinger to the Japanese Palace, the Royal Library was open to the public. The resulting high number of visitors caused progressive wear and tear on individual books, which were particularly well-known and therefore often taken to hand, necessitating protective measures. Under the head librarian Konstantin Karl Falkenstein, these often very valuable books were therefore moved to the Manuscripts Room in 1835, which was therefore later called the Cimelia Room, and from then on they were only displayed under glass lintels. The present Book Museum traces its tradition back to this.

Exactly one century later, the librarian Erhart Kästner completed a book museum around the Cimelia Room in 1935 under the directorate of Martin Bollert, which he had been working on for several years. Even then, parts of it were designed as a place for permanent and thematic temporary exhibitions. The air raids on Dresden in 1945 completely burned down the Japanese Palace and with it the Book Museum. Many of the objects were damaged or destroyed at that time.

After the Second World War, the library moved in 1947 to a former barracks building on Marienallee in the Albertstadt district, which was intended as a temporary solution. The book museum was also reopened here in 1952. In 1993, the book museum was redesigned and a cimelia room was reinstalled. In addition, two rooms were available for special exhibitions. Due to the forthcoming move, the Book Museum was temporarily closed in 2002.

On January 14, 2003, the Book Museum reopened in the new building of the Dresden State Library, which had meanwhile merged with the Dresden University Library to form the SLUB Dresden, on the TU campus. Its new and prestigious rooms were planned from the beginning to be used as a museum.

== Collection ==
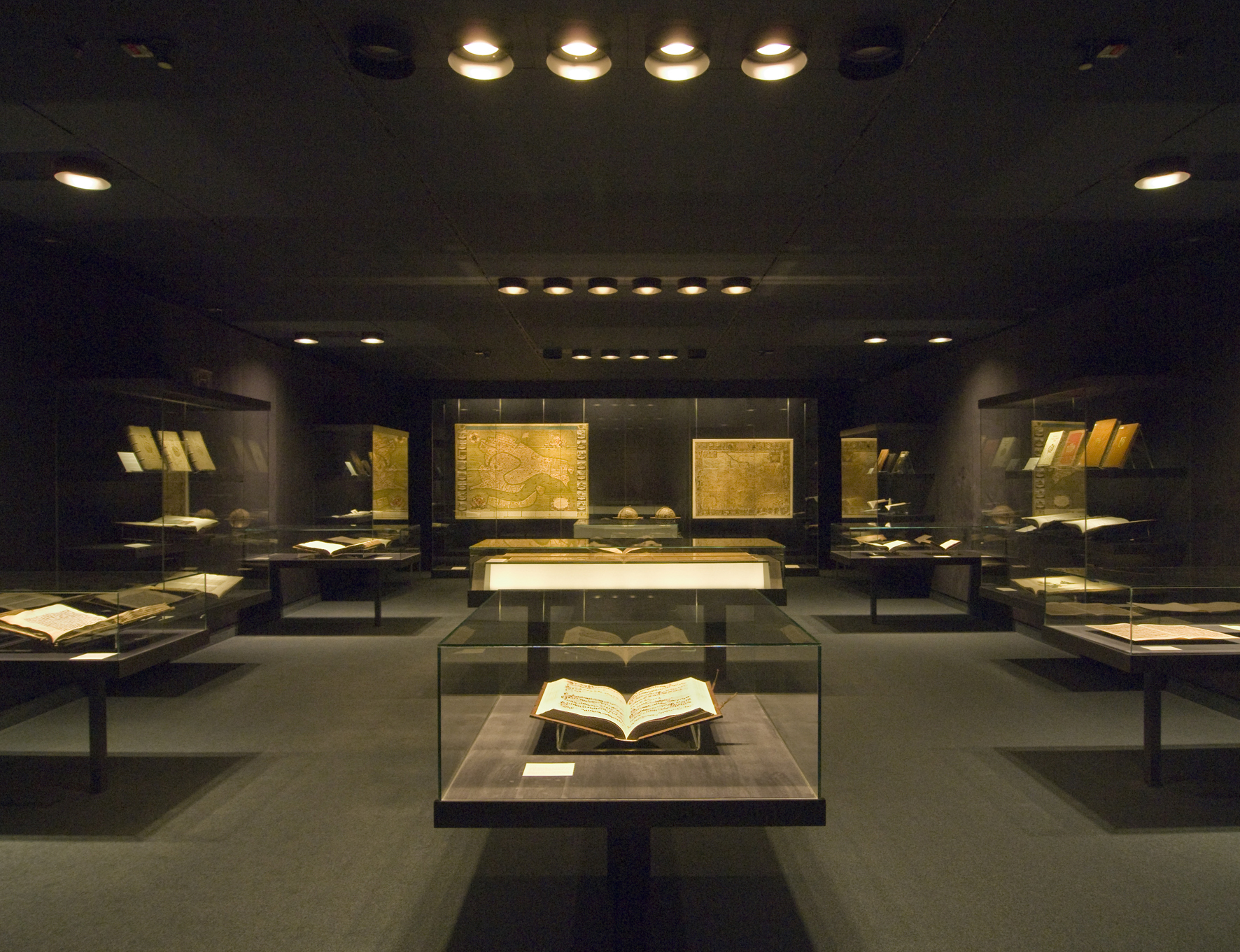
Treasury of the Book Museum

The treasure chamber of the book museum contains especially valuable pieces from the SLUB's holdings. The most important exhibit from a scientific-historical point of view is the Codex Dresdensis, a Mayan manuscript acquired in 1739 by the Elector Friedrich August II for his collection. It is dated to about 1200 AD and is one of the four preserved codices of this type in the world.

The changing tableaux of the treasury can be viewed on the library's web pages.

=== Exhibition ===
The exhibition of the Book Museum is located in the northern of the two above-ground blocks of the SLUB building. As a special collection, it does not belong to the open access and stacks of the library and is divided into two parts: an area for temporary exhibitions, which surrounds the so-called treasure chamber.
