= Lectionary 57 =

Lectionary ℓ 57
- New Testament manuscript
- Name: Dresdensis
- Text: Evangelistarion, Apostolos
- Date: 15th-century
- Script: Greek
- Now at: Saxon State Library
- Size: 21.5 cm by 19.7 cm

Lectionary 57, designated by siglum ℓ 57 (in the Gregory-Aland numbering), is a Greek manuscript of the New Testament, on paper leaves. Palaeographically it has been assigned to the 15th-century.

== Description ==
The codex is an Euchologium with lessons from the New Testament, on 408 paper leaves (21.5 cm by 15.7 cm). It is a lectionary (Evangelistarion and Apostolos). The text is written in one column per page, in 20 lines per page, in Greek minuscule letters.

== History ==
In 1515 the manuscript was in Nauplia, in 1545 in Venice. It once belonged to Loescher, then to Graf Brühl. It was the last Gospel lectionary added to the list of New Testament manuscript before Johann Martin Augustin Scholz. The manuscript was described by Christian Frederick Matthaei.

The manuscript is sporadically cited in the critical editions of the Greek New Testament (UBS3).

Currently the codex is located in the Saxon State Library (A. 151), in Dresden.

== See also ==
- List of New Testament lectionaries
- Biblical manuscript
- Textual criticism
