= Podelwitz =

Coordinates: 51.4277°N 12.3818°E

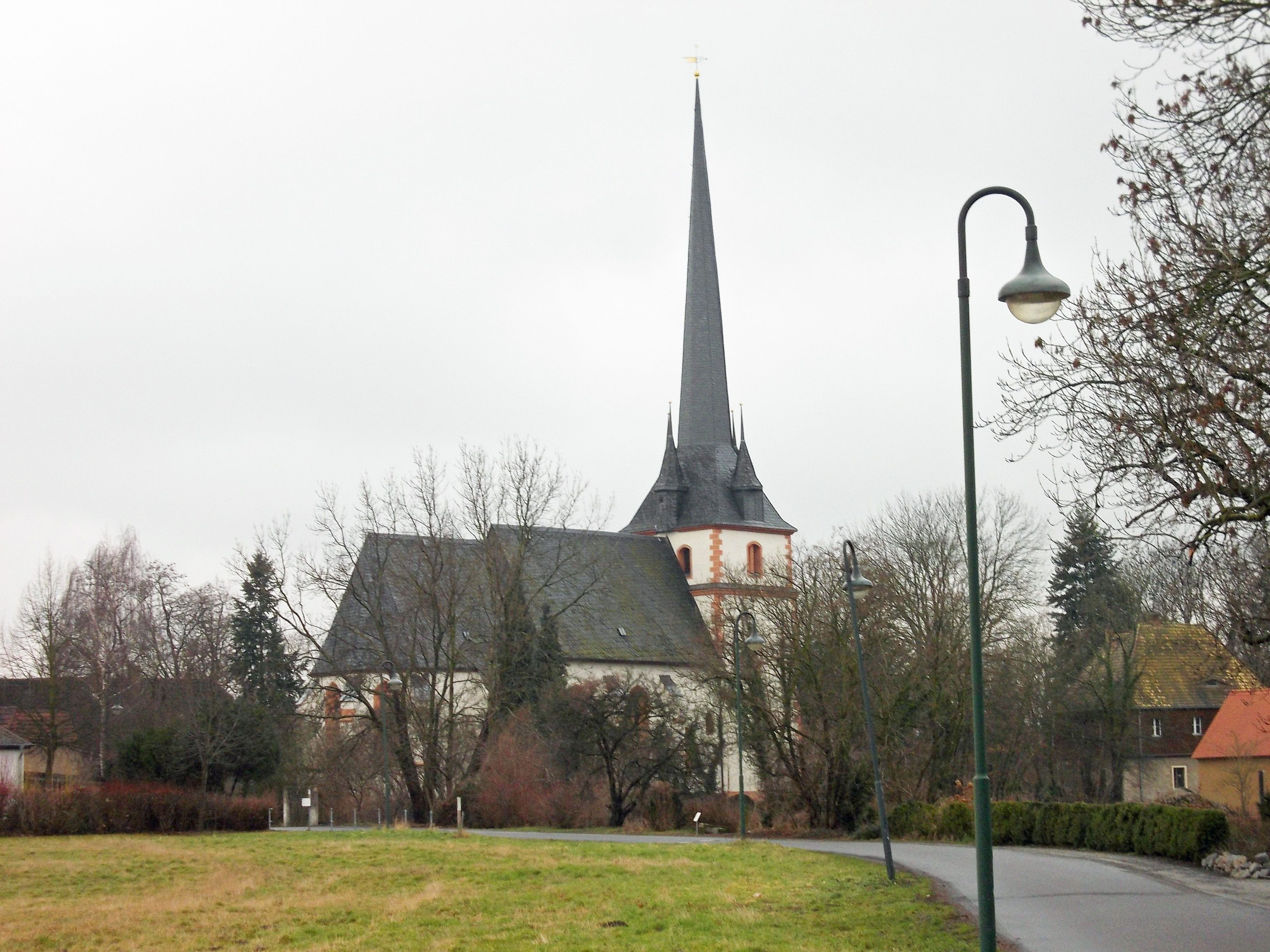
Podelwitz church

Podelwitz is a village in the municipality of Rackwitz in the Nordsachsen district of the federal state of Saxony in Germany.

== Geographical Location ==
Podelwitz is located approximately 9 kilometer north of downtown Leipzig and about 14 km south of Delitzsch.

== History ==
The village was first documented in the year 1250 as Bodelwicz when on Christmas Eve of this year Henry III, Margrave of Meissen gifted the church in Podelwitz to the Teutonic Order. The church dates from the 13th Century, the reredos from the year 1520.

After the Vienna Congress of 1815, Podelwitz was granted to Prussia as part of the district of Delitzsch, whereas the district to the south remained in the Kingdom of Saxony. A porphyrous stone to mark the border is still in place in the village today.

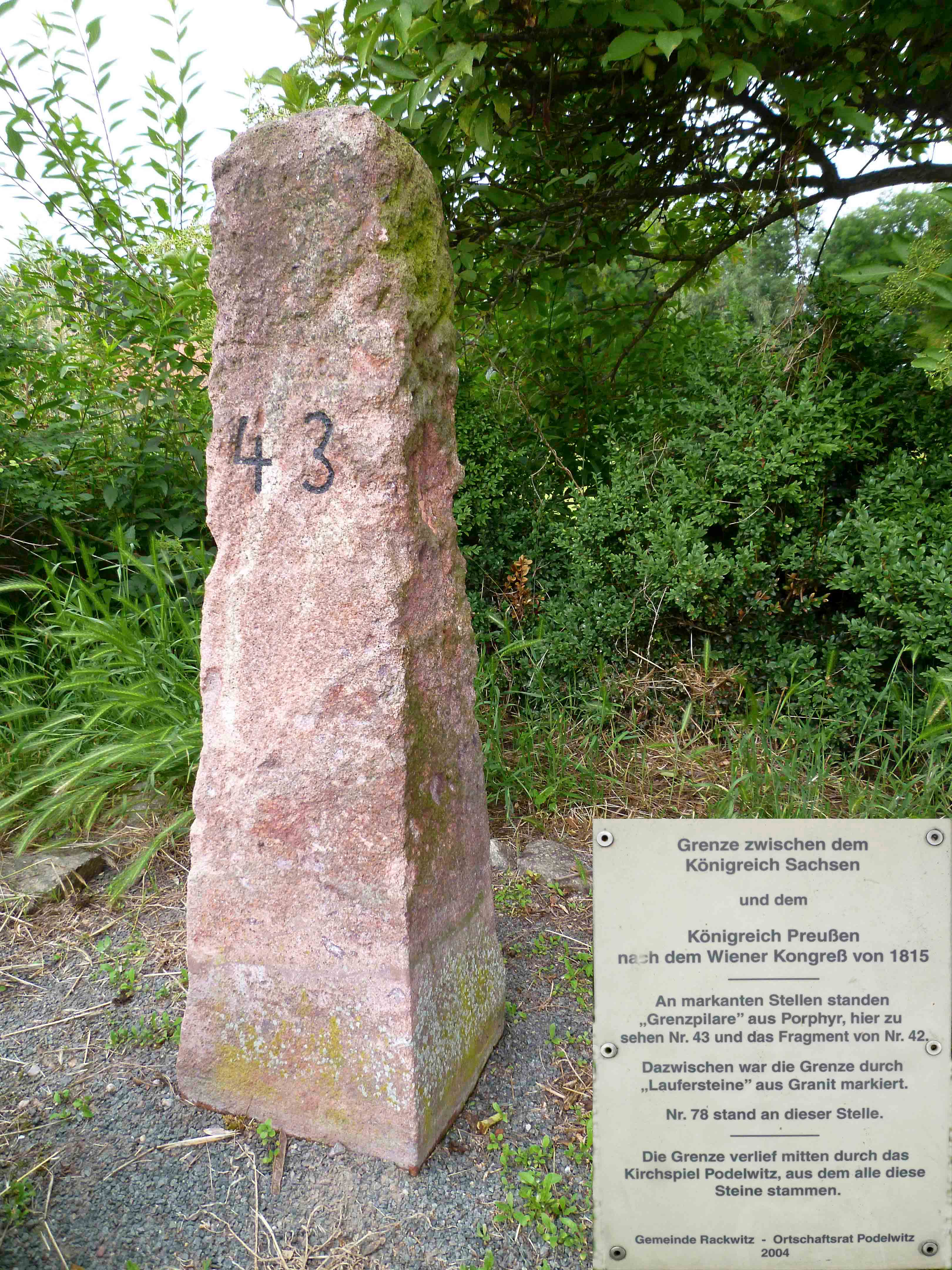
Border stone

== Demographics ==
Date	Inhabitants
November 2006	474
February 2008	479
June 2015	493
