= Saxon State and University Library Dresden =

Combined library in Germany

Coordinates: 51°01′41″N 13°44′12″E

- Sächsische Landesbibliothek und Universitätsbibliothek Dresden (SLUB)

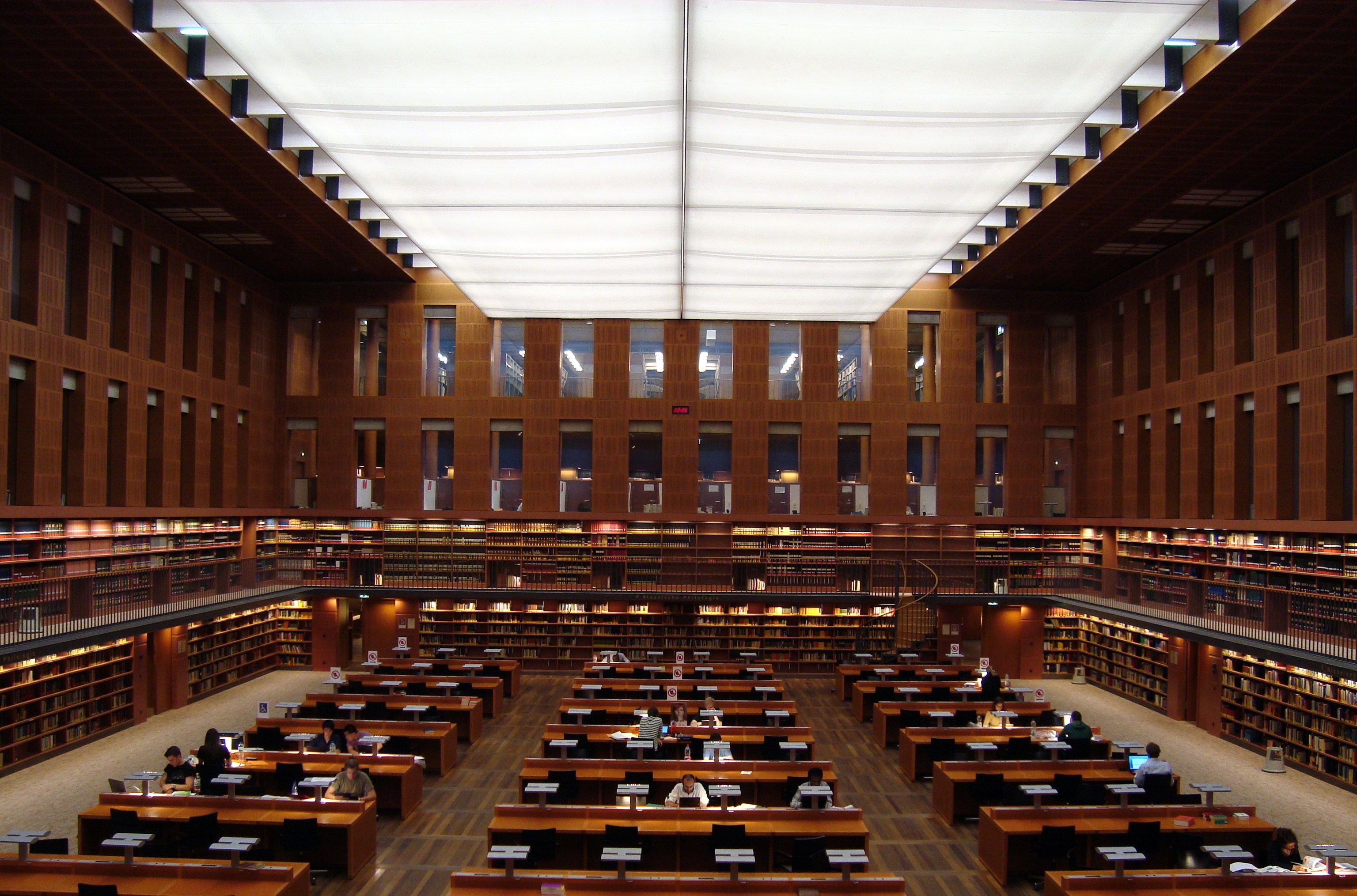
- Main reading room of the Saxon State Library
- Location: Dresden, Saxony, Germany
- Type: State and university library
- Established: 1556 and 1828

Collection
- Size: 8,300,000
- Legal deposit: Yes, for published literature in Saxony

Other information
- Director: Katrin Stump
- Website: www.slub-dresden.de

The Saxon State and University Library Dresden (full name in German: Sächsische Landesbibliothek – Staats- und Universitätsbibliothek Dresden), abbreviated SLUB Dresden, is located in Dresden, Germany. It is both the regional library (German: Landesbibliothek) for the German State of Saxony as well as the academic library for the Dresden University of Technology (German: Technische Universität Dresden). It was created in 1996 through the merger of the Saxon State Library (SLB) and the University Library Dresden (UB). The seemingly redundant name is to show that the library brings both these institutional traditions together.

The SLUB moved into a large new building in 2002 to bring together the inventories of both its predecessors. Its collection numbers nearly nine million, making it one of the largest public archival centers in the Federal Republic of Germany. It holds significant treasures, including the Codex Dresdensis, a book which was believed to be the oldest surviving book written in the Americas, dating to the 11th or 12th century. Within the SLUB is the Deutsche Fotothek, holding some 4 million photographs from the past 80 years, and the German Stenographic Institute.

== Collections ==
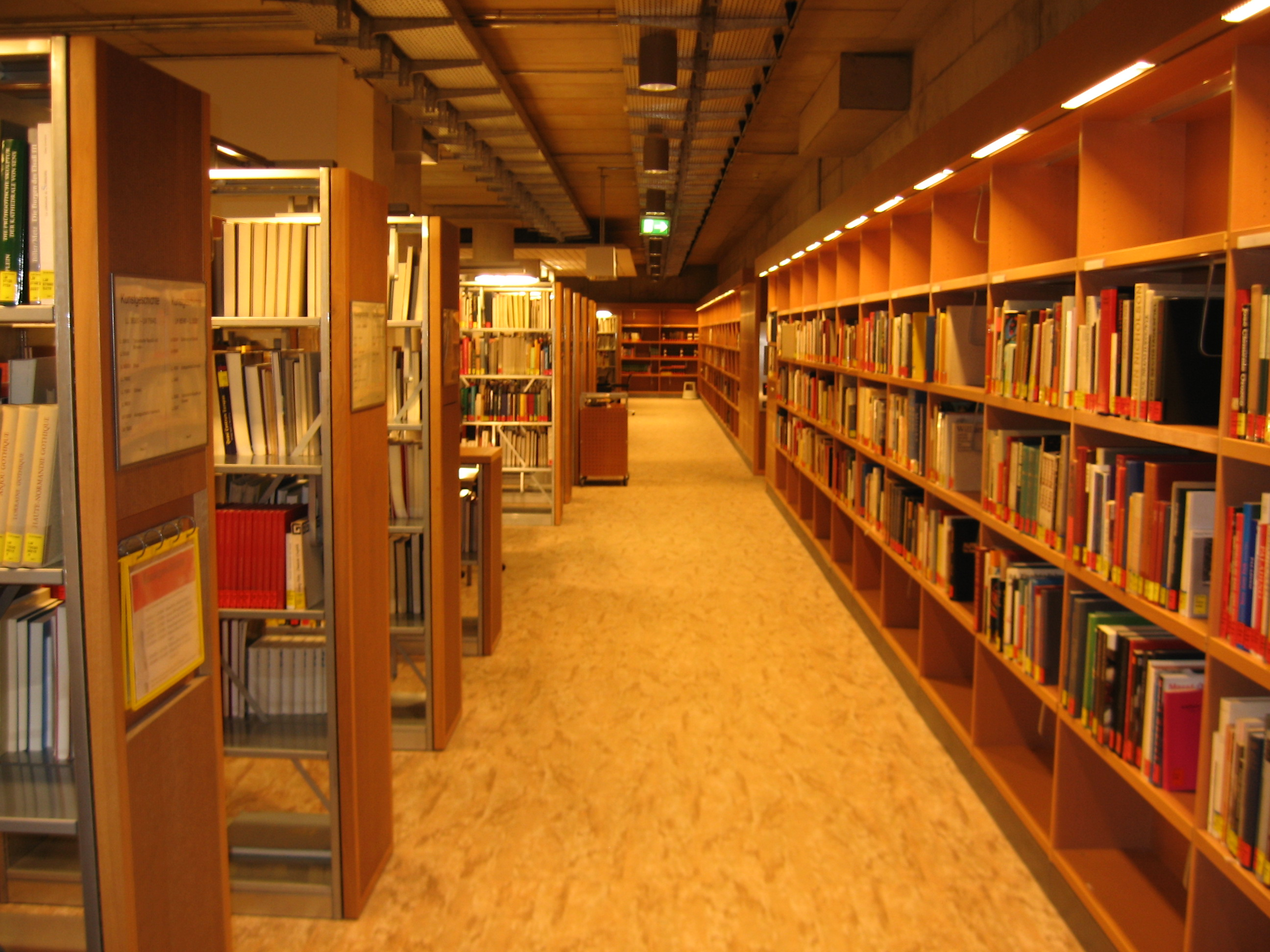
Shelves of the open access holdings

The library administers 5,388,595 holdings (volumes). It is a special-interest collection library of the Deutsche Forschungsgemeinschaft (German Research Foundation, DFG) focusing on "Contemporary Art after 1945" and "History of Technology". Both collections also include subjects such as commercial photography, documentary photography, photographic art, and photography of technics.

The first preserved index of the state library's collections dates back to the year 1574 and can also be viewed on the internet. Further services on the internet include, for example, the Kartenforum with historical maps of Saxony and the Fotothek, providing pictorial documents for research.

=== Deutsche Fotothek ===
The Deutsche Fotothek is based on the Dresden traditions of photographic techniques and camera manufacture as well as photographic art. The Landesbildstelle was originally established in Chemnitz, but was shortly afterwards, in 1925, relocated to Dresden. Since 1956 the inventory has been labeled Fotothek. Since 1983 it has belonged to the Sächsische Landesbibliothek as a separate section. With 2.3 million photographic documents, the Fotothek has a very large share of the overall holdings. The oldest images from around 1850 can be traced back to the photographer Hermann Krone.

=== Manuscripts and Rare Printings ===
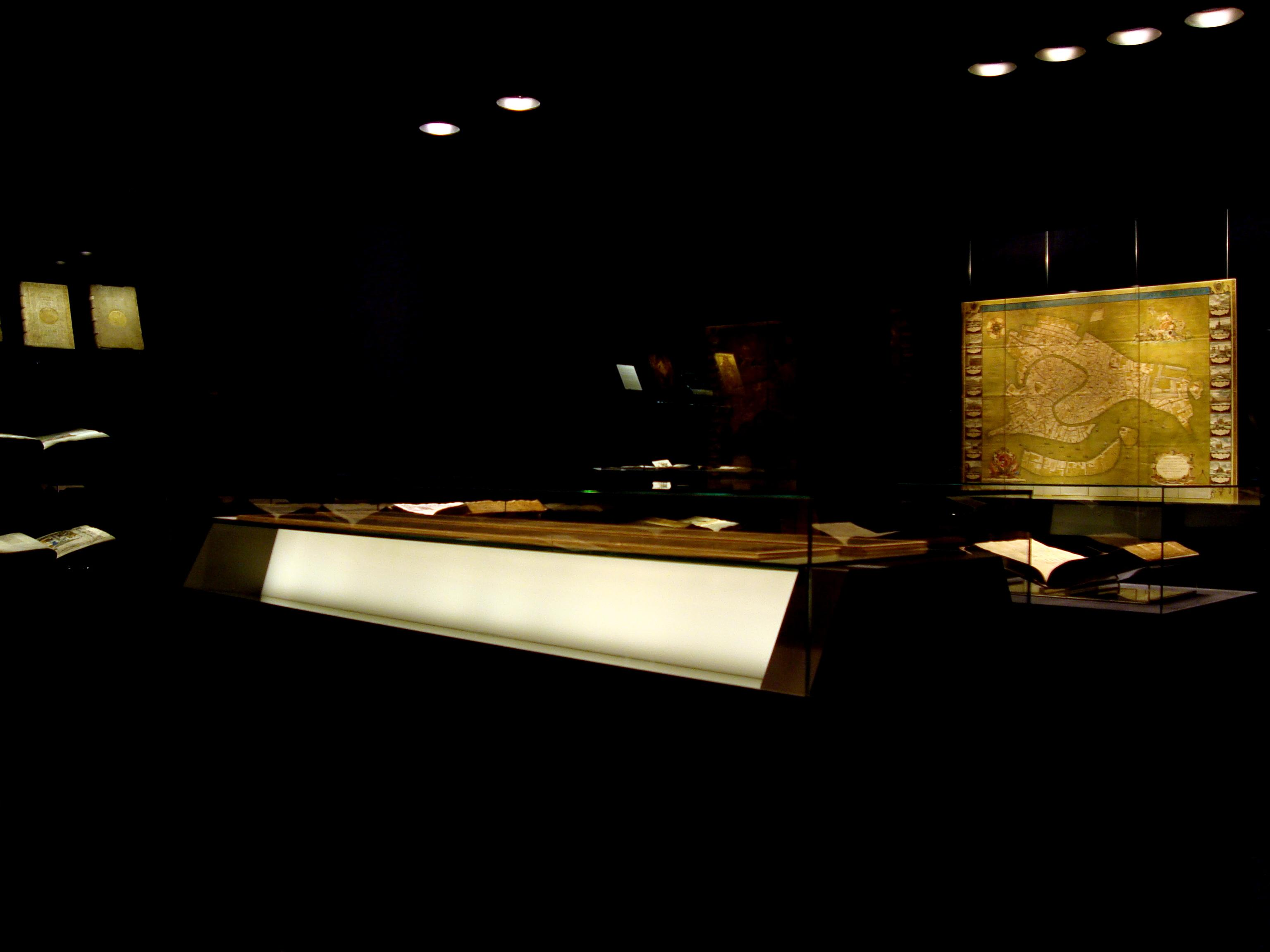
Some of the library's most precious books are exhibited in the treasure chamber.

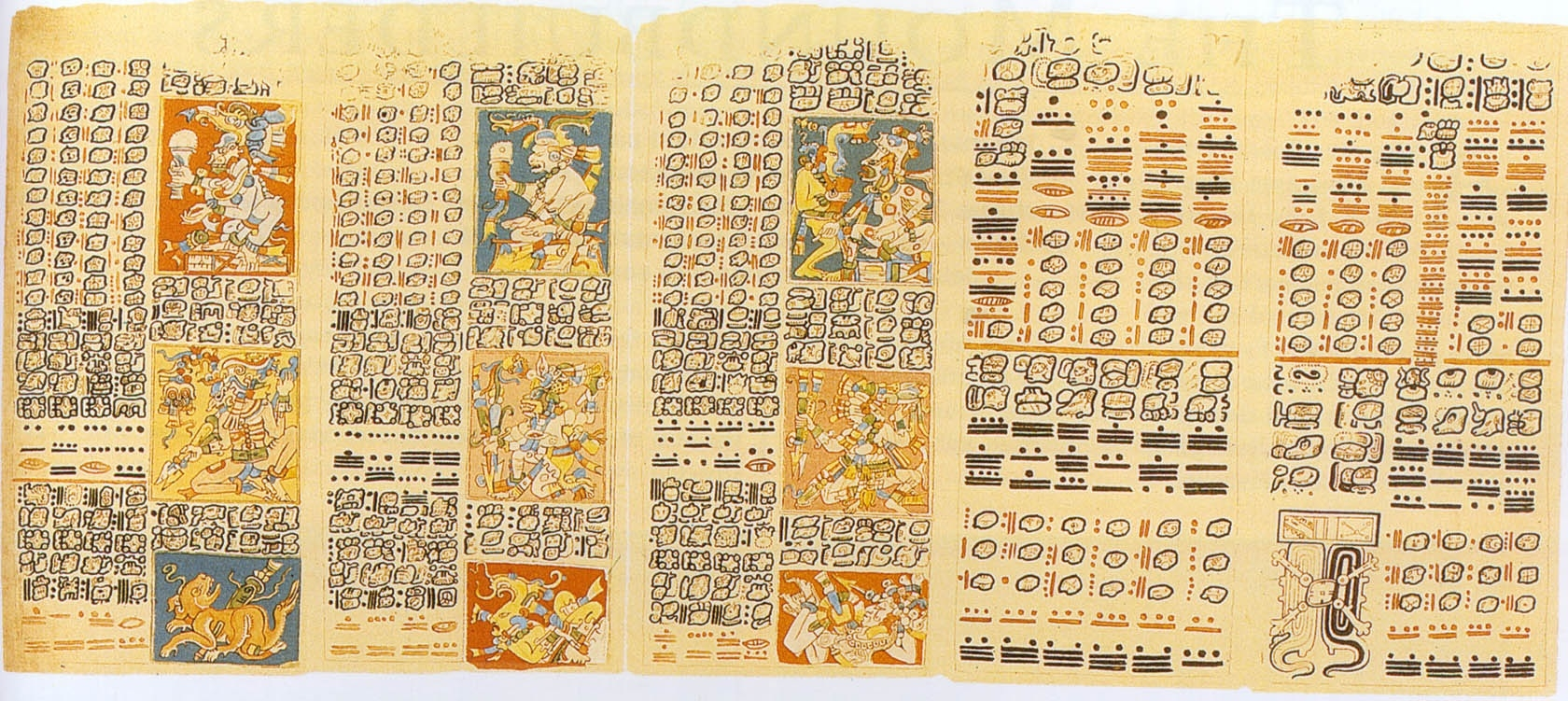
Detail from the Codex Dresdensis, owned by the library since 1739 and identified in 1853 as a Mayan manuscript

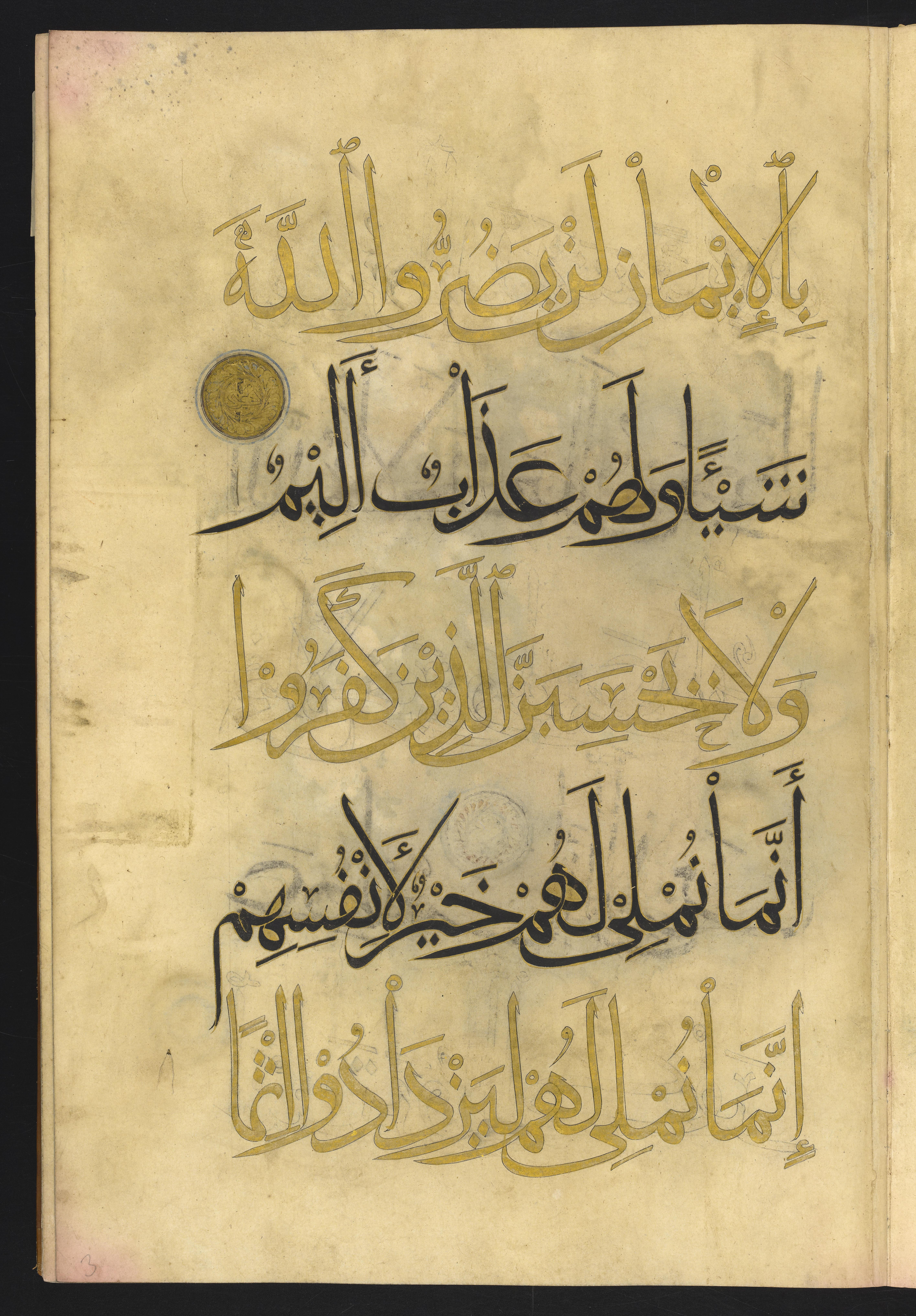
Page from the Qur'an copied by Ahmad al-Suhrawardi (1256–1340), made for the ilkhan Öljaitü (reigned 1304–1316)

As well as the open-access and storage holdings, the book museum holds a special-interest collection including a transcript of the Maya manuscript Codex Dresdensis, the oldest book written in the Americas known to historians, dating back to 1200 AD and purchased by Saxony in 1739. There are only three other existing codices left. They are located in Paris, Madrid, and Mexico. The Codex runs for inclusion in the UNESCO Memory of the World Programme (MOW). The elaborately restored Dresdner Sachsenspiegel is exhibited in the treasure chamber for six weeks each year. As part of the Bibliotheca Corviniana, the Corvines of Dresden have been admitted into the Memory of the World Program by UNESCO in 2005.

=== Digital collections ===
Since 2007, the SLUB Dresden operates the Dresden Digitization Center and has been continually expanding its capacity up to 3 million pages per year. More than 95,000 volumes have been digitized and are free to use within the Digital Collections. The SLUB is one of the major providers of data for the Deutsche Digitale Bibliothek, which has been accessible online since November 2012. This is also facilitated by numerous third-party funds, especially by the Deutsche Forschungsgemeinschaft. In this way, the SLUB e.g. participates in the digitization of indexes of printing published in the German language area in the 17th and 18th centuries. Also worth mentioning is the digitization of the electronic editions of August Wilhelm Schlegel's collection and illustrated magazines of classical modernism. Today, there are more than 74,000 titles, nearly 92,000 volumes and approximately 1.5 million media items (images, maps, drawings) existent in the Digital Collections of the SLUB. The open source software Goobi, utilized for the digitization workflow, has been significantly refined to edit and display different media types.

=== Special-interest collections ===
Two special collection areas of the Deutsche Forschungsgemeinschaft have been established at the SLUB. Hence, the SLUB Dresden represents one of further 22 academic libraries that are intended to ensure the availability of relevant research literature of a research area by maintaining particular core themes.

==== Contemporary art after 1945, photography, industrial design and commercial art ====
The library's oldest special interest collection deals with contemporary art from 1945 onwards. This topic had already been one of the library's core themes of collection within the library landscape during the GDR. In 1993, the DFG started funding this special interest collection. Devoid of any temporal constraint, topics of photography, industrial design and commercial art are part of the collection. The collections are for example attached to the Sondersammelgebiet Mittlere und Neuere Kunstgeschichte bis 1945 und Allgemeine Kunstwissenschaft (special interest collection focusing on art history until 1945 and general science of art) of the Heidelberg University Library.

The holdings of the special-interest collection include approximately 150,000 volumes and 330 periodicals. Apart from art history of Europe and North America and art theory, collected literature focuses on concrete painting, graphics, sculpture and crafts as well as new art forms like land art, digital art, video art, performance art and other.

By means of the DFG funding, the SLUB has established the Virtual Library focusing on Contemporary Art ViFaArt from January 2001 until 2004. Since 2012, the hitherto separately displayed services of the Virtual Library of Contemporary Art and "arthistoricum.net – Virtual Library for Art History" have been combined in a mutual Virtual Library for Art under the name of "arthistoricum.net".

==== History of Technology ====
The special-interest collection History of Technology is funded by the Deutsche Forschungsgemeinschaft. Since 1998, the DFG annually sponsors the SLUB's acquisition of foreign journals, monographs and microforms focusing on the history of technology. The SLUB completes the acquisition of foreign and domestic literature with own resources. Currently, the SLUB is equipped with approximately 31,000 monographs and more than 110 journals on the topic.

Besides the classic acquisition of literature, the focus is on providing internet-based services for bibliographic searches. The services are accessible via the specialist portal "Schaufenster Technikgeschichte".

=== Saxonica ===
Since the end of the 18th century – during the term of Johann Christoph Adelung – Saxonica have been collected systematically at the electoral library. Initially focused on literature on Saxon history, the collection of Saxonica was, in the 19th century, extended to other scientific areas with regional aspects such as natural history, folklore, geography, archeology or linguistics. Today, the term "Saxonica" includes all types of German and foreign-language media of all scientific areas relating to Saxony and its subterritories (such as natural and cultural areas, administrative units, historical regions etc.), its locations as well as living and deceased personages associated with Saxony.

Since the beginning of the 20th century, Saxonica have been attested in the Sächsische Bibliographie. The founder of this regional bibliography was Rudolf Bemman, followed by Jakob Jatzwauk. Except for manuscripts and photographs, all Saxonica have been attested in the Sächsische Bibliographie Online since 1992. All previously published titles are being gradually included in this proof.

To collect and store items of literature, images and sound regarding Saxony as well as the development of the Sächsische Bibliographie are tasks accomplished by the Saxon State and University Library Dresden.

=== Maps ===
The map collection includes map sheets focusing on Saxon mapping, but also exceedingly on historical maps of Europe and Germany. The map collection encompasses circa 138,000 single sheets, of which 19,650 originated up to and including 1800, and 41,600 between 1801 and 1945, as well as further sheets which have been charted after 1945. The collection serves as a scientific source of regional history in general, but also of the history of specific places, fortresses and castles, as well as of historical spatial, landscape and traffic development. Roughly 11,000 sheets of the collection are presumed to still be located in Russia.

The SLUB's Map Forum is an information portal of libraries, museums and archives, supervised by the Deutsche Fotothek and sponsored by the DFG. To date, around 24,800 of the most important, digitized cartographical sources in the collection – especially those pertaining to Saxon history and regional studies – are available in high resolution digital images in the Map Forum.

=== Music ===
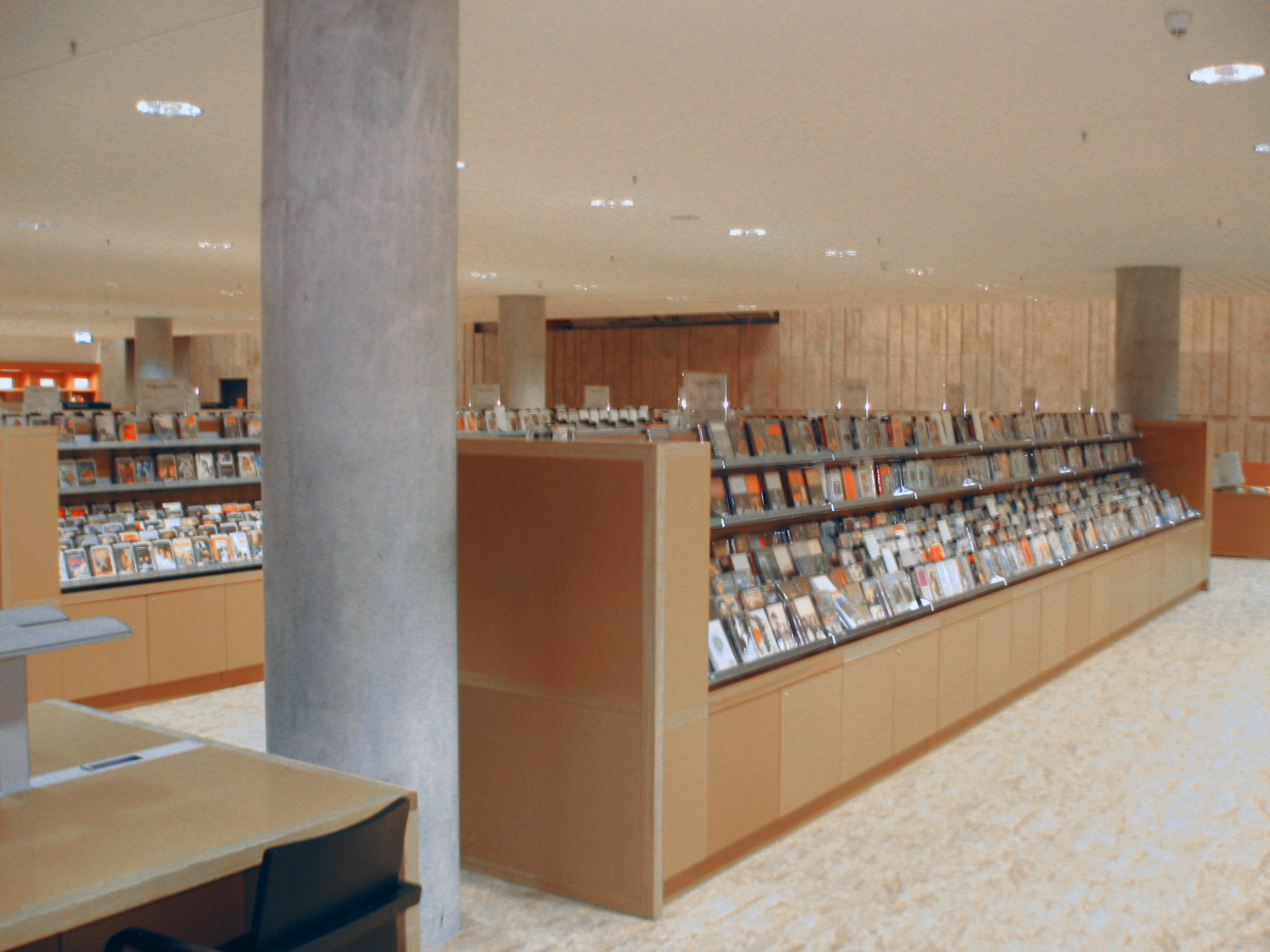
The music department in the basement

The Music Department comprises approximately 200,000 volumes. The department is divided into New Prints and Music Manuscripts and Historical Prints – with the publishing year 1850 marking the difference between "new" and "historical" items. The department is closely intertwined with the Mediathek, containing recorded music, the Fotothek, containing music-iconographical material, and the manuscript collection, which also encompasses letters of musicians.

In 1816, Friedrich Adolf Ebert founded the department by merging the hitherto separate holdings Musica theoretica and Musica practica. Until 1934, the department was augmented, for example by the royal private music collection of King Albert of Saxony or the historical collection of the state opera (Staatsoper Dresden). In 1983, the state library became the Zentralbibliothek der DDR für Kunst und Musik (the GDR's central library for art and music).

== Architecture ==
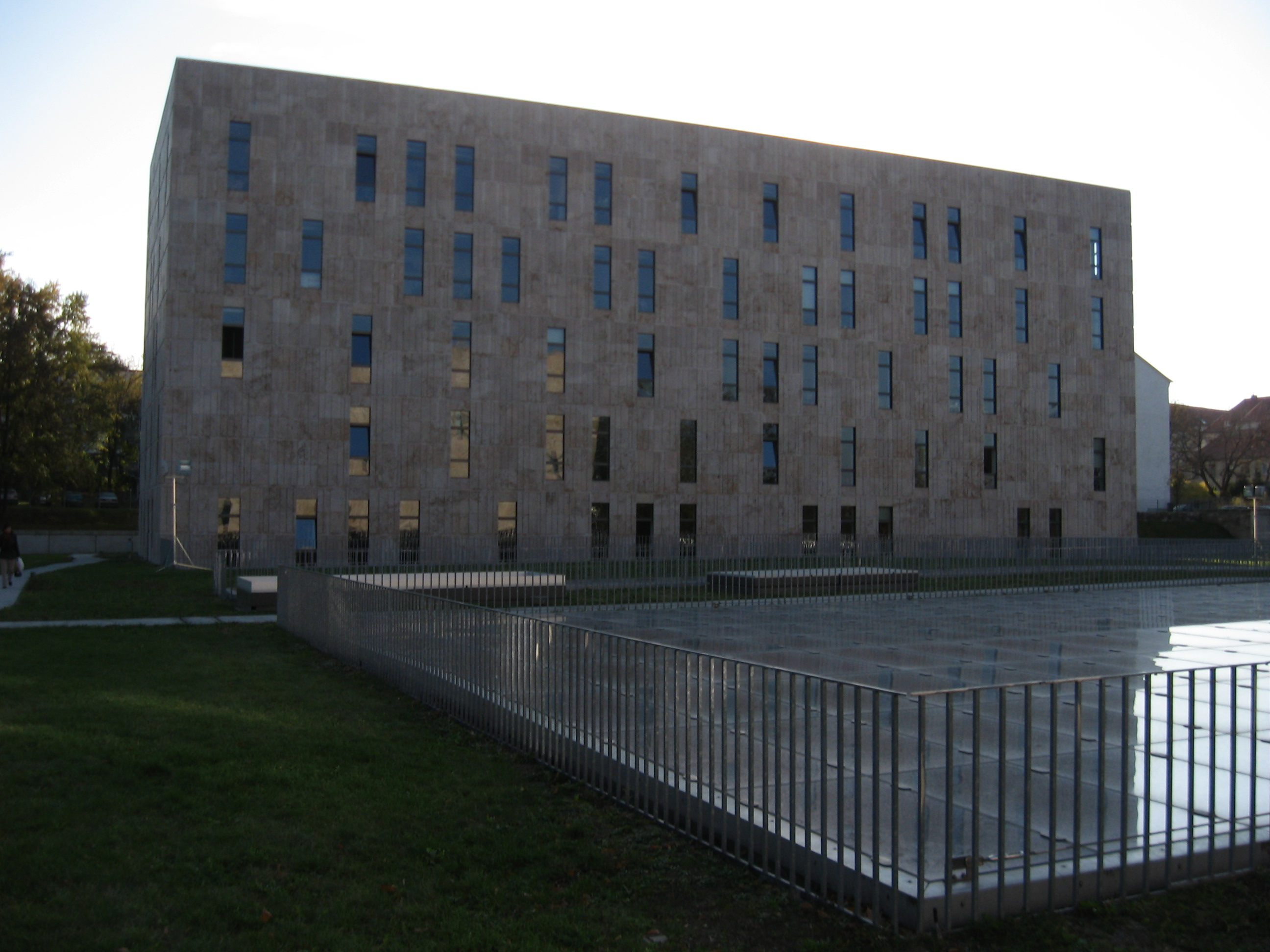
One of the dyadic central building's stone clad edifices and the glass roof of the main reading room

The SLUB's main building was drafted by the architectural office Ortner & Ortner and erected from 1999 to 2002. On more than 40,000 square metres, the building provides approximately 1,000 study desks, of which 200 are located in the main reading room. The construction costs amounted to roughly 90 million Euros.

During the SLUB's period of construction, further buildings of contemporary architecture in Dresden came into being, such as the Ufa-Kristallpalast, the Neue Synagoge, the Gläserne Manufaktur or the Neue Terrasse.

== Sites ==
Besides the central library at Zellescher Weg, the SLUB encompasses five further sites. Opposite to the central building sits the departmental library DrePunct. This location houses the branch libraries of the following TU Dresden faculties: civil engineering, electrical engineering, electronics, earth sciences, computer sciences, mechanical engineering, transportation sciences, and business and economics. The faculties educational science (August-Bebel-Straße), Medicine (Fiedlerstraße), Law (Bergstraße) and forest science (Tharandt) have their own SLUB branch libraries.

== History ==
=== History of the State Library ===
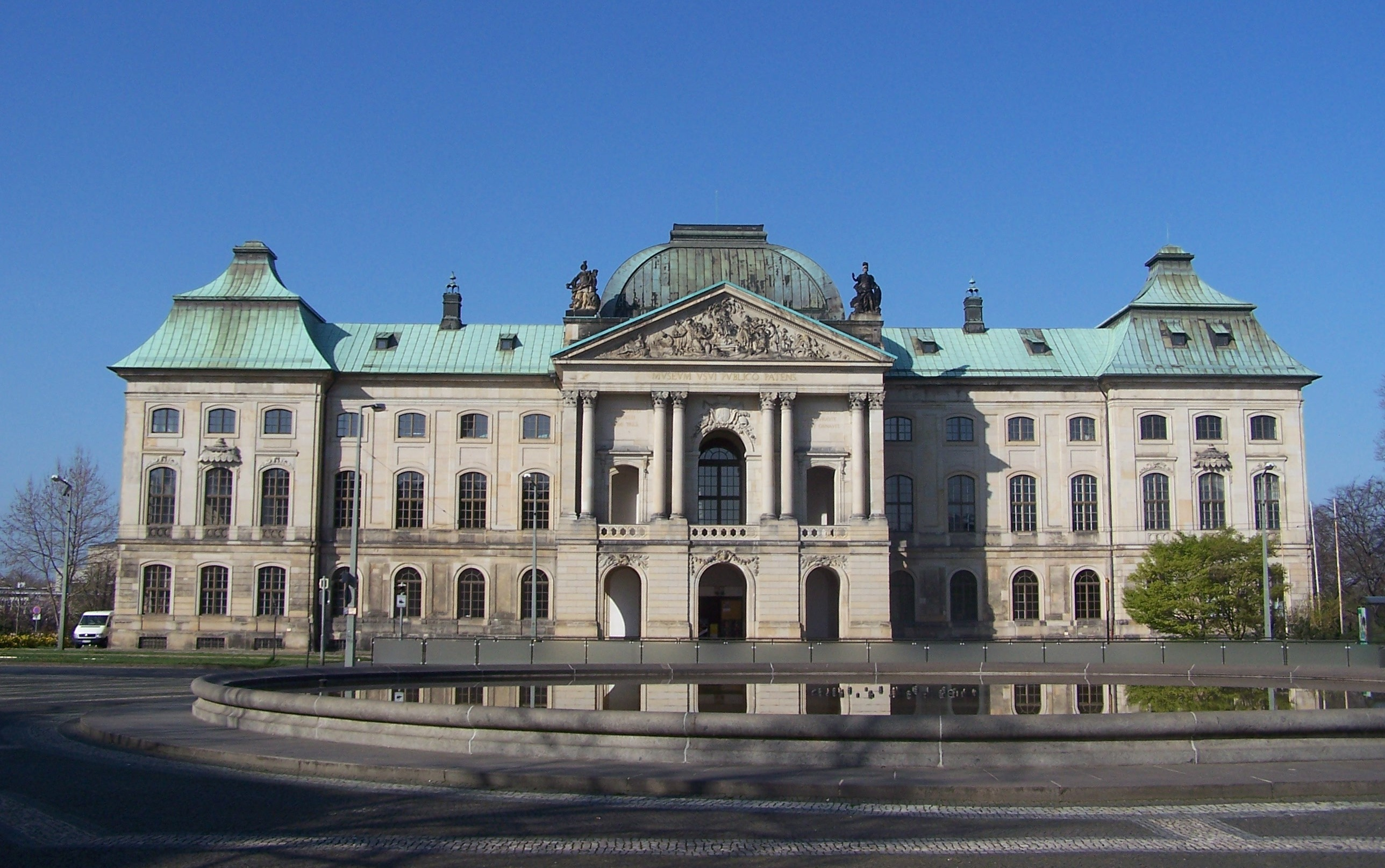
The Japanische Palais held the collections of the State Library for 159 years.

From 1485, the city of Dresden was the seat of the Wettin dukes of Saxony, who from 1547 were prince-electors. The royal state library was founded in 1556, when Prince-Elector Augustus (ruled 1553–1586) started systematically to acquire learned books and literary works. The prince himself inspected the lists of books offered at the book fair in Leipzig, the largest and most important city in his state, whose library had received the contents of the religious houses dissolved at the Reformation. Further, he instructed his diplomats to buy rare and precious books abroad.

During the first half of the 18th century, under two rulers, Augustus the Strong (ruled 1694–1733) and his son, Augustus II (ruled 1733–1763), Dresden became a major European cultural center. The Court Library became a true state library for Saxony, absorbing many manuscripts, maps, and books from distinguished private collections, with some spectacular purchases, such as the Dresden Codex that was obtained in 1739. In 1727, the library moved into two wings of the Zwinger Palace. When Frederick the Great of Prussia attacked Dresden in 1760, part of the library burned; there are singed volumes in the collection to this day. By the end of the 18th century it had outgrown its wing of the Zwinger, and the library then moved to the Japanese Palace. In 1788 the Saxon Library was opened to the public. Following the proclamation of the Weimar Republic in 1919, it officially became the Saxon State Library, with its strengths continuing to lie in the arts, humanities, social sciences, literature and linguistics.

With the onset of World War II, the most precious holdings of the State Library were dispersed to 18 castles and offices, away from any possible military objectives. Consequently, they largely survived the bombing raids of February and March 1945 which destroyed the former library buildings and virtually the whole historic center of Dresden — with losses of about 200,000 volumes of twentieth-century manuscript and printed holdings and also some irreplaceable musical manuscripts. The losses include the major corpus of Tomaso Albinoni's unpublished music, though Georg Philipp Telemann's manuscripts were preserved (catalogued, 1983). The library's copy of Sachsenspiegel, considered one of the most important manuscripts due to its historic significance in law and its illustrative quality, suffered from water damage. It underwent a restoration in the 1990s. After the war, some 250,000 books were taken to the Soviet Union.

=== History of the University Library ===
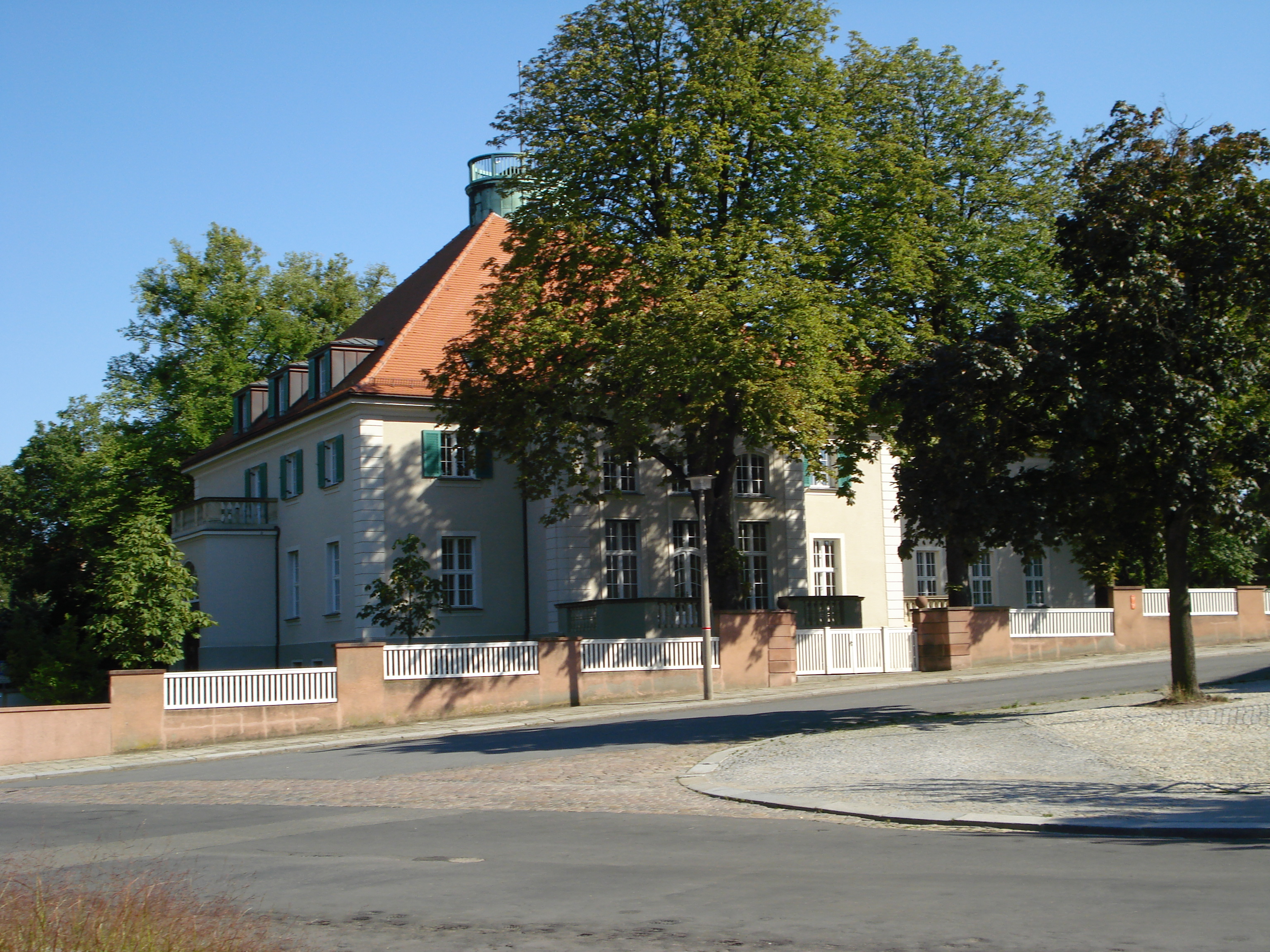
Until 1995, the mansion of today's rectorate accommodated the main building of the university library.

The university library was laid out in 1828 as the library of the Königlich-Sächsische Bildungsanstalt (Royal Saxon Academy). From 1851 to 1890, the academy was labeled Royal Saxon Polytechnical School. In 1872, university and library were relocated near today's central station. In 1890, the collection became the library of the Technische Hochschule and thus an academic library as of today.

In 1945, the university library was also destroyed, its stocks reduced. A relocation of the library to a mansion on today's university campus – now site of the Dresden University of Technology's rectorate – followed. Under the direction of Helene Benndorf, the reconstruction of the annihilated subject catalog took place, as well as the construction of the central catalogue of the university and the re-opening of the Patentschriftstelle. The renaming to "University of Technology" followed in 1961, resulting in the label "university library". Since 1977, the lendings in the branch libraries are operated centrally.

After 1990, the TU Dresden was expanded to a comprehensive university and augmented by the branch libraries of law, business and economics. In 1992, the joining of the Technical University and the Hochschule für Verkehrswesen (academy of transportation sciences) followed, as well as the adoption of the academy library. In 1993, the university library was expanded once more, when research institutes and educational establishments of the dissolved Medizinische Akademie Dresden were assigned to the Technical University.

In 1997, the branch library of education moved to August-Bebel-Straße. The following year, the departmental library De.Punct opened its doors and accommodated several faculty libraries.

In 1999, with the merger of university library and state library, the construction of the new central building on the TU Dresden campus began. On 1 August 2002, the SLUB opened for the readers. On 14 January 2003, its official inauguration followed. With its big main reading room and its carrels, the central building provides excellent working conditions.

== Awards ==
With regard to its comprehensive digitization activities, the library was honored in the context of Initiative Deutschland, Land der Ideen on 22 February 2009.

== See also ==
- Dresden Codex
- Dresden University of Technology
- Deutsche Fotothek
