= Konrad Helbig =

German photographer (1917–1986)

- Born: 7 June 1917; Leipzig, German Empire
- Died: 17 February 1986 (aged 68); Mainz, West Germany
- Known for: photography, art history, archeology
- Website: www.deutschefotothek.de/documents/kue/70055314

Konrad Helbig (1917–1986) was a German photographer, art historian and archaeologist. He is mostly known for intimate images of young Sicilian men, discovered only after his death.

== Life and work ==
Helbig was a soldier in Wehrmacht, fighting in the Soviet Union during World War II. He was taken into captivity as prisoner of war. Helbig was able to return in 1947 from Soviet captivity. Immediately thereafter, at the age of thirty, he began studying art history and archeology. He was particularly interested in the Mediterranean cultures. After graduation, he traveled many times to the Mediterranean over the next few decades. Helbig worked both as a photographer and author of journal articles, with publications such as travel magazine Merian and Atlantis. He also published picture books, such as the volume on Sicily, published in 1956. Helbig mainly photographed in black and white. An essential exception, however, are color slide positives, which were intended for his slide lectures.

Helbig is mostly known for intimate images of young Sicilian men. Only after his death in Mainz in 1986 were the nude photographs of young men discovered in his estate. The photographs, some of which were taken in the 1950s, are seen in the tradition of Wilhelm von Gloeden and Guglielmo Plüschow.

== Collections ==
Helbig's photographic work is held in the archives of the Deutsche Fotothek in Dresden including 160,000 photographs, of which 60,000 are color slides; in the picture archive Foto Marburg of the University of Marburg (23,800 photographs, of which 11,000 are of Greece and 6,000 of Italy); and in the State Archive Hamburg within the collection of the German Society for Photography archive.

== Exhibitions ==
- Viaggio in Italia II: Konrad Helbig – Herbert List, Galleria d'Arte Moderna, Bologna, 2002. Curated by Peter Weiermair.
- Marins, Légionnaires, Ouvriers, Galerie Au Bonheur du Jour, Paris, 2008
- Helbig. Am Mittelmeer, Rheinisches Landesmuseum Bonn, 2018

== Publications ==
- Konrad Helbig (mit Texten von Hugo von Hofmannsthal): Sizilien, Wiesbaden 1956
- Harald Keller, Karl Heinz Hoenig (mit Fotos von Konrad Helbig): Umbrien. Landschaft und Kunst, Schroll, München 1959
- Konrad Helbig und Toni Schneiders: Archipelagus, Leibniz, Hamburg 1962
- Konrad Helbig und Gerd Gaiser: Tempel Siziliens, Insel, Frankfurt 1963
- Konrad Helbig und Gerhard Kleiner: Minoische Kunst Insel, Frankfurt 1964
- Konrad Helbig, F. C. Gundlach, Wolfgang von Wangenheim, Peter Weiermair: Ragazzi, Braus, Heidelberg 2001, ISBN 978-3-926-31856-5 (dt./ital.)
- Konrad Helbig: Homo Sum, Braus, Heidelberg 2004, ISBN 978-3-899-04070-8 (dt./engl.)
