= Friedrich Adolf Ebert =

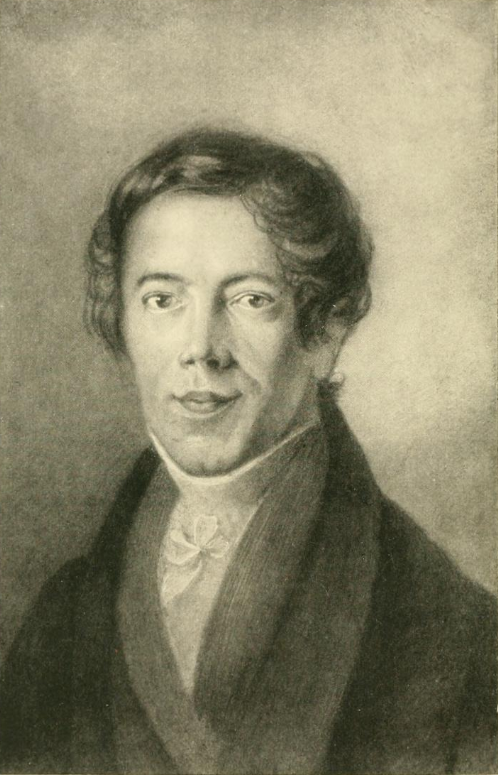
Friedrich Adolf Ebert, 1827

Friedrich Adolf Ebert (July 9, 1791 – November 13, 1834) was a German bibliographer and librarian.

== Biography ==
Ebert was born at Taucha, near Leipzig, the son of a Lutheran pastor.

At the age of fifteen, Friedrich was appointed to a subordinate post in the municipal library of Leipzig. He studied theology for a short time at Leipzig, and afterwards philology at Wittenberg, where he received a PhD in 1812. While still a student in 1811, he had already published a work on public libraries. In 1812, he published another work entitled Hierarchiae in religionem ac literas commoda ("The advantages of hierarchy for religion and literature").

In 1813, he was attached to the Leipzig University library, and in 1814 was appointed secretary to the Royal Library of Dresden. The same year, he published F. Taubmanns Leben und Verdienste and in 1819 Torquato Tasso, a translation from Pierre Louis Ginguené with annotations.

The rich resources open to him in the Dresden library enabled him to undertake the work on which his reputation chiefly rests, the Allgemeines bibliographisches Lexikon, the first volume of which appeared in 1821 and the second in 1830. This was the first work of the kind produced in Germany, and the most scientific published anywhere.

From 1823 to 1825, Ebert was librarian to the Duke of Brunswick at Wolfenbüttel. He returned to Dresden in 1827 and was made chief librarian of the Dresden Royal library. Among his other works are:

- Die Bildung des Bibliothekars (1820) ("The Education of the Librarian")
- Geschichte und Beschreibung der königlichen Bibliothek in Dresden (1822) ("History and Description of the Royal Library in Dresden")
- Zur Handschriftenkunde (1825–1827)
- Culturperioden des obersächsischen Mittelalters (1825) ("Cultural Periods of Medieval Upper Saxony")
- A general bibliographical dictionary, Volume 4 (1837)

Ebert was a contributor to various journals and took part in the editing of Ersch and Gruber's great encyclopedia. He died in Dresden on November 13, 1834, due to a fall from a ladder in his library.
