= Kitodo =

Kitodo.Presentation
- Developer: Kitodo Community Board
- Initial release: 2004; 22 years ago
- Stable release: 6.0.0 / 4 December 2025
- Written in: PHP, JavaScript
- Operating system: platform-independent
- Available in: English, German
- Type: Digitisation
- License: GNU GPL 3
- Website: www.kitodo.org/software/kitodopresentation/
- Repository: github.com/kitodo/kitodo-presentation

Kitodo.Production
- Developer: Kitodo Community Board
- Initial release: 2004; 22 years ago
- Stable release: 3.9.1 / 7 May 2026
- Written in: Java
- Operating system: platform-independent
- Available in: English, German
- Type: Digitisation
- License: GNU GPL 3
- Website: www.kitodo.org/software/kitodoproduction/
- Repository: github.com/kitodo/kitodo-production

Kitodo (Abbr. of key to digital objects) is an open-source software suite intended to support mass digitization projects for cultural heritage institutions. The software implements international standards such as METS, MODS and other formats maintained by the Library of Congress. Kitodo consists of several independent modules serving different purposes such as controlling the digitization workflow, enriching descriptive and structural metadata, and presenting the results to the public in a modern and convenient way. It is used by archives, libraries, museums, publishers and scanning utilities.

== Structure ==
Kitodo contains the two main modules Kitodo.Presentation and Kitodo.Production and the following properties:

- Central management of the digital copies (images)
- Central metadata management: it supports cataloguing and integration of metadata from various locations
- Controlling mechanisms: they are used to control the progress of work of the partners
- Export and import interfaces for metadata and third-party digital copies
- Management tasks: managing error messages, completion of work work steps and to convey to the next step, including the change of partners
- Platform-independence: Kitodo is a Web application and has to be designed in this way, as partners in digitisation of a customer are often distributed all over the world.

The viewer module includes an indexer.

Components for the distributed workflow management are integrated into the product to ensure the management of a distributed communication and production among various partners.

== History ==
Until May 2016, Kitodo was known as Goobi (Abbreviation of Göttingen online-objects binaries). The workflow part of the software exists in two different forks of the original Goobi software. While the Goobi community edition, now known as Kitodo, is cooperatively maintained by major German libraries and digitization service providers, the Intranda edition is developed by a single company. Kitodo is used in at least 8 German libraries.

In May 2016, the German Goobi association Goobi Digitalisieren im Verein e. V. decided to choose the new name Kitodo to avoid legal problems with the old name Goobi.
