= Deutsche Fotothek =

Coordinates: 51°01′40″N 13°44′12″E

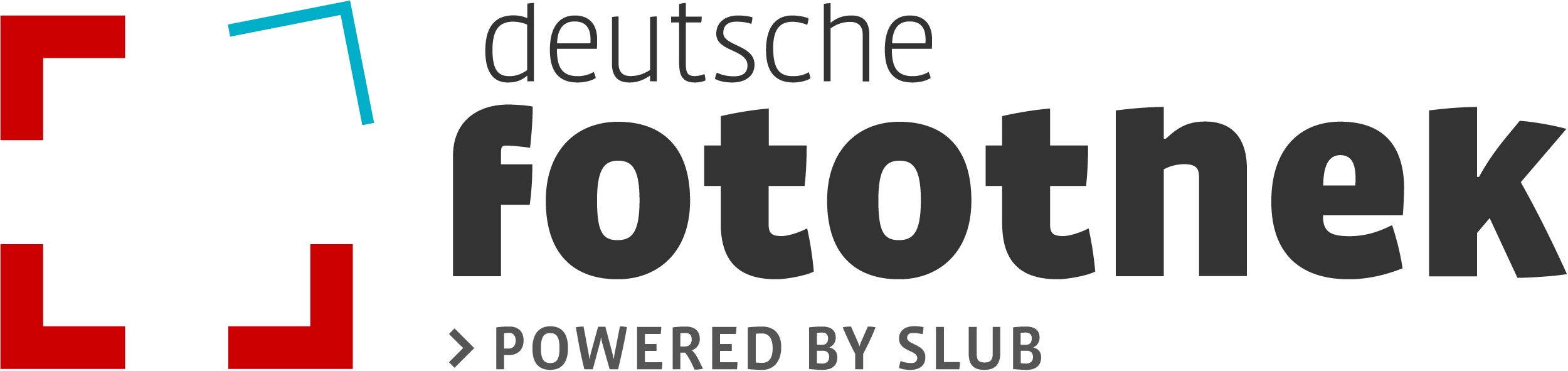
Logo of the Deutsche Fotothek from 2022

The Deutsche Fotothek (German pronunciation: [ˈdɔʏtʃə fotoˈteːk]) is a picture library in Dresden, Germany, located in the Saxon State Library. It holds more than two million images. Its strengths are in art, architecture, music, geography, technology, the economy, and the Saxony region. Its collection came from institutions, companies, and individuals such as Hermann Krone.

== History ==
The German Photo Library, also known as the Landesbildstelle Sachsen, is a photo archive located in Dresden, Germany. It was established in 1924 as the Saxon State Association for the Promotion of Film and Photography, and was later renamed the Landesbildstelle Sachsen. The library's main task is to supply educational institutions in Saxony with teaching materials, such as photographs, slides, and films. It also provides further training courses, especially for teachers.

The library's holdings are primarily focused on regional history and geography, and its collections are primarily composed of photographs taken by its own photographers. The first director of the library was Dr. Fritz Schimmer, who held the position until 1936 and again from 1945 to 1950. The library's first photographer was Walter Möbius. In 1944, the library's holdings included 47,000 negatives and 65,000 slides.

During the air raids on Dresden in February 1945, the library was destroyed except for its negative collection (40,000 pieces) and picture card collection, which had been moved to Dippoldiswalde and Gaußig. After the war, the library was re-established in Dresden, and its collections continued to grow. Today, the German Photo Library holds over 2 million photographs and slides, making it one of the largest photo archives in Germany. The oldest photographs in the collection date back to the middle of the 19th century.

The Landesbildstelle was a picture archive and photo workshop located in the Ehrlichstraße 1 vocational school in Dresden, Germany. It was founded in 1946 by Fritz Schimmer and officially reopened in 1947. During this time, the collection profile was expanded to include photographs from Germany, Europe, and the rest of the world. In 1950, the picture archive and photo workshop were spun off from the Landesbildstelle and renamed the Landesbildarchiv, which was assigned to the Landesamt für Volkskunde und Denkmalpflege (State Office for Folklore and Monument Preservation) as the Landesfotothek.

The Landesfotothek was located in the rebuilt Saxon House of Estates and was led by Hans-Heinrich Richter until 1974. He was followed by Walter May (until 1989), Werner Starke (until 1999), and Wolfgang Hesse (until 2003). In 1952, as part of an administrative reform, the Landesfotothek was placed under the State Commission for Art Affairs as the Dresden State Photo Library. At the time, the collections included about 100,000 negatives and 35,000 slides. The main tasks of the photo library were to collect, preserve, maintain, and make the holdings available for scholarly research and work.

In 1956, the Ministry of Culture gave the Landesfotothek its own statute as the "Deutsche Fotothek Dresden – Zentrales Institut für kulturwissenschaftliche Bilddokumente" (German Photo Library Dresden – Central Institute for Cultural Science Image Documents). In 1961, it was affiliated with the Deutsche Staatsbibliothek Berlin. By 1966, the collections included over 280,000 negatives, 150,000 picture cards, and 75,000 slides for loan. In 1983, the photo library became a department of the then-Saxon State Library (SLB) due to the close proximity and the fact that the state collection priorities of the two institutions largely overlapped.

The collection grew to include around 650,000 negatives, 12,000 positives, and 60,000 lending slides. In terms of content, the focus of the collections shifted towards social documentary and reportage photography, in line with current cultural policy. The goal was the "cultivation and development of the humanist and proletarian-revolutionary photographic heritage, especially that of the years after 1945". These guidelines and the associated increase in acquisition funds led to a rapid expansion of the holdings.

In 1996, the library of the Technical University and the SLB merged to form the Saxon State Library – Dresden State and University Library (SLUB), and the photo library came under this roof. The Ständehaus was assigned to the Dresden Higher Regional Court, and the Landesfotothek moved to rooms on Bautzner Straße 19. With the new building of the SLUB, the photo library also received new rooms on Zellescher Weg.

== Collection ==
The German Photographic Library holds over 6 million photographic documents. With the Archive of Photographers, the Deutsche Fotothek offers a virtual showcase for the works of important German photographers or photographers working in Germany. In addition to its own photographs, a large part of the holdings come from the collections of institutions, companies and, above all, from estates and bequests, for example of Christian von Alvensleben, Christian Borchert, Ermenegildo Antonio Donadini, Fritz Eschen, Erwin Fieger, Germin, Walter Hahn, Konrad Helbig, Erich Höhne, Paul W. John, Martin Langer, Rudi Meisel, Richard Peter, Abraham Pisarek, Roger Rössing, Wolfgang G. Schröter, Jacques Schumacher, Ingolf Thiel, Reinhart Wolf and Paul Wolff.

Collections in the Deutsche Fotothek:

- Superordinate topics / Photography
  - Archive of Photographers
  - Worldviews
  - Worker photography
  - Traffic
  - Aerial photos
  - Fashion photos of the 20s and 30s
- Collections and Archives
  - Historical picture postcards – Collection Sabine Giesbrecht
  - Janke Archive
  - Talleyrand Collection
  - Mill archive Rapp
- Historical
  - First World War
  - Sorbian Culture
  - Special order Linz
- Graphics / Illustration / Magazines
  - Virtual map forum
  - Illustrations of the history of technology from prints of the 16th and 17th centuries
  - Virtual copperplate engraving cabinet
  - Architectural drawings
  - Furniture design
  - GDR art
  - Artists' journals
- Persons / Bequests
  - Richard Strauss
  - Richard Wagner
  - M. D. Pöppelmann

== Usage ==
In addition to the usual on-site use, a large part of the photographs, as of April 2022 about 2,200,000 images from 90 institutions, can be searched online. The expansion of online access to the entire collection is a permanent task of the institution.

=== Wikimedia Commons ===
In 2009, the library announced that it was donating approximately 250,000 image files to Wikimedia Commons under a Creative Commons BY-SA 3.0 license.
