= Schatzkammer =

German word meaning "treasury" or "treasure chamber"

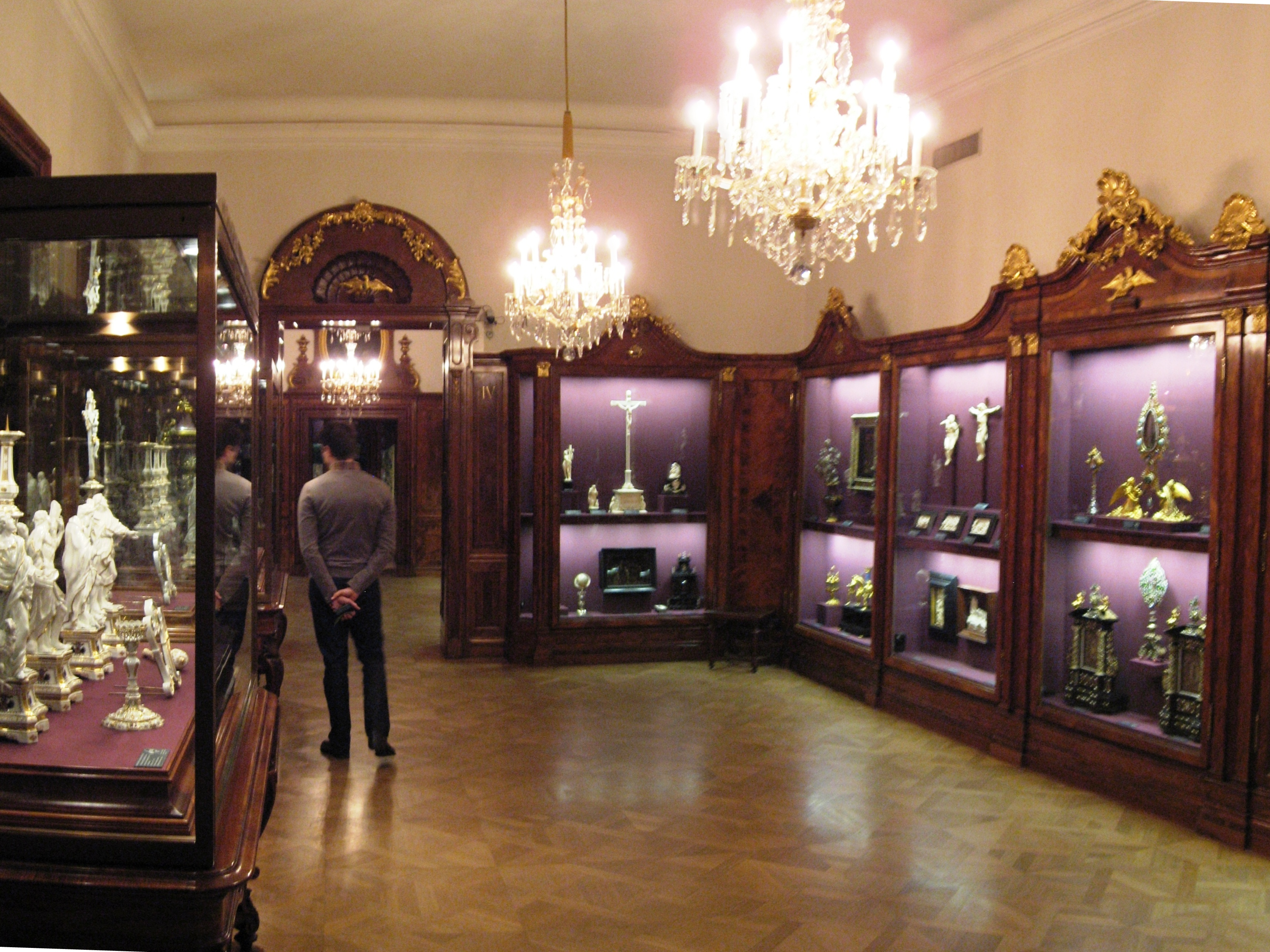
Ecclesiastical treasury in Vienna's Hofburg Palace

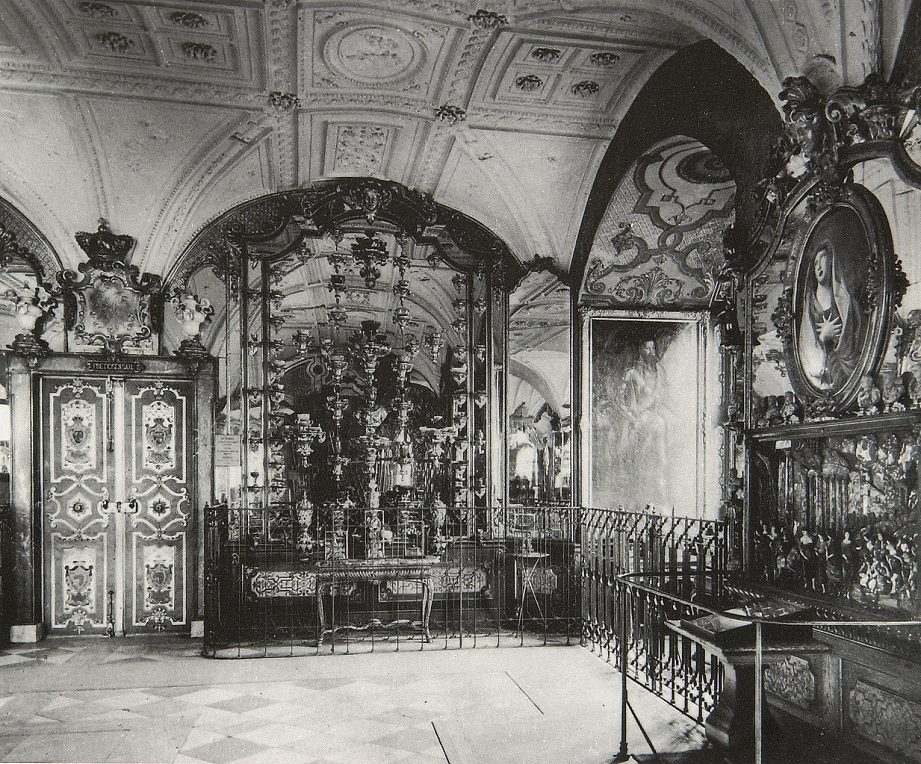
The Green Vault in Dresden Castle (as at 1904)

Schatzkammer, a German word which means "treasury" or "treasure chamber", is a term sometimes used in English for the collection of treasures, especially objets d’art in precious metals and jewels, of a ruler or other collector which are kept in a secure room and often found in the basement of a palace or castle. It also often included the wider types of object typical of the Renaissance cabinet of curiosities. A very small but evocative Renaissance room in a tower at Lacock Abbey was designed for keeping and viewing the treasures of the newly rich owner.

The term is normally used of the collections of European rulers or very wealthy families. Well-known examples are:

- The Imperial Treasury at the Hofburg Palace in Vienna, Austria.
- The collection of the royal regalia and treasures of the Bavarian Wittelsbach dynasty, housed in the Residenz Palace in Munich, Germany.
- The vast collection of the Wettin monarchs of Saxony, kept in the Green Vault at Dresden Castle in Dresden, Germany.
- The Crown Jewels of the United Kingdom in the Tower of London.
- A display of Bourbon treasures in the basement of the Museo del Prado, Madrid.
- The Waddesdon Bequest, a 19th-century collection of mostly Renaissance treasures now displayed together in the British Museum.
- The Waddesdon Manor permanent display of the Treasury displays more than 300 precious objects reflecting generations of Rothschild collecting.
- Rosenborg Castle in Copenhagen displays objet de vertu in silver, ivory and other precious materials, some in the cabinets and treasure rooms (porcelain room, glass room) specially constructed over the centuries by the Kings of Denmark for their display. The Crown Jewels and the Danish Crown Regalia are displayed in a series of modern galleries built inside an enormous vault in the basement.

Church establishments also had treasuries where similar objects were kept, which are often now open as museums. Especially important and largely intact examples are:

- The treasury of St. Peter's Basilica in Rome
- The treasury of San Marco, Venice, which retains a unique collection of Byzantine art, looted during the Fourth Crusade.
- The Trier Cathedral Treasury
- The Essen Cathedral Treasury
- The Aachen Cathedral Treasury at the Aachen Cathedral (Germany), one of the most important collections of church cultural artefacts in Europe
- The Treasury of the Basilica of Saint Servatius in Maastricht, a church treasury with some fine specimens of Medieval Mosan metalwork

Examples outside Western Europe include:

- The Treasury of St. Vitus Cathedral in Prague, Czech Republic
- The Russian Crown treasury at the Diamond Fund of Moscow Kremlin.
- The Treasure Rooms of Topkapi Palace display Ottoman treasures.
