= Goobi =

- Developer: intranda GmbH
- Initial release: 2004; 22 years ago
- Stable release: 25.11 / 28 November 2025; 39 days ago
- Repository: github.com/intranda/
- Written in: Java
- Operating system: platform-independent
- Available in: English, German
- Type: Digitisation
- License: GNU GPL
- Website: www.intranda.com/en/digiverso/goobi/goobi-overview/

Goobi (Abbr. of Göttingen online-objects binaries) is an open-source software suite intended to support mass digitisation projects for cultural heritage institutions. The software implements international standards such as METS, MODS and other formats maintained by the Library of Congress. Goobi consists of several independent modules serving different purposes such as controlling the digitization workflow, enriching descriptive and structural metadata, and presenting the results to the public in a modern and convenient way. It is used by archives, libraries, museums, publishers and scanning utilities.

== Structure ==
Goobi has the following properties:

- Central management of the digital copies (images)
- Central metadata management: it is possible to catalogue and integrate metadata from various locations
- Controlling mechanisms: they are used to control the progress of work of the partners
- Export and import interfaces for metadata and third-party digital copies
- Management tasks: managing error messages, completion of work steps and conveying to the next step, including changing partners
- Platform-independence: Goobi is a Web application and has to be designed in this way, as partners in digitisation of a customer are often distributed all over the world.

Components for the distributed workflow management are integrated into the product to ensure the management of a distributed communication and production among various partners.

== History ==
Goobi is widely used in 40 European libraries in Austria, Germany, the Netherlands and UK. The workflow part of the software existed in two different forks of the original Goobi software. While the Goobi community edition was cooperatively maintained by major German libraries and digitization service providers, the Intranda edition is developed by a single company.

In May 2016, the German Goobi association Goobi Digitalisieren im Verein e. V. decided to choose the new name Kitodo to avoid legal problems with the old name Goobi.

The software Goobi will be further developed.
