= Rackwitz =

- Municipality
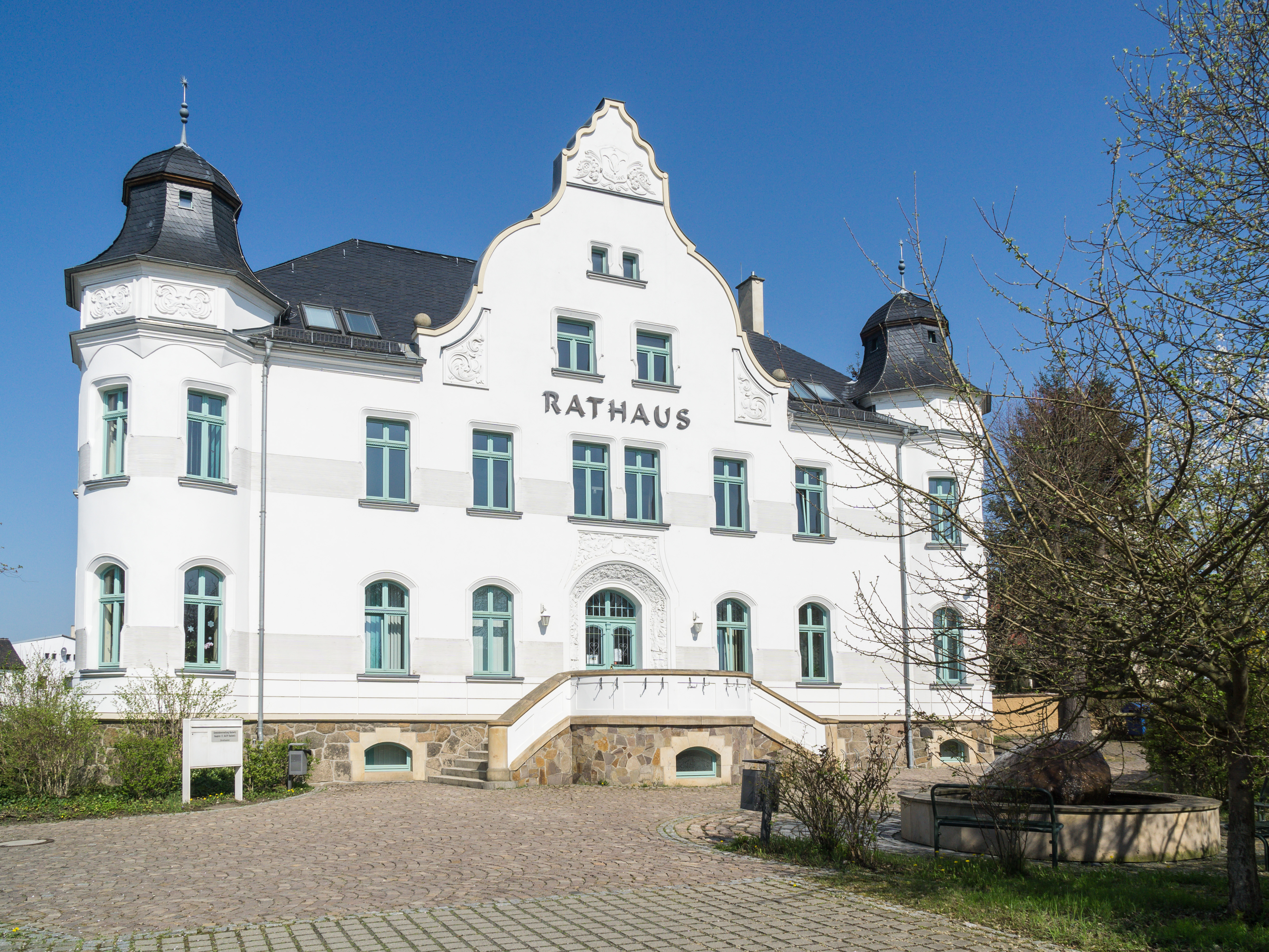
- Town hall

- Coat of arms

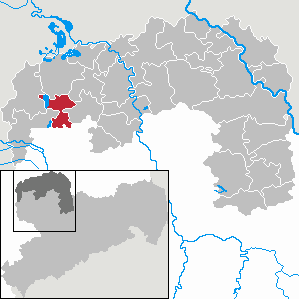
- Location of Rackwitz within Nordsachsen district
- Interactive map of Rackwitz
- Location within Germany Location within Saxony
- Coordinates: 51°26′N 12°23′E
- Country: Germany
- State: Saxony
- District: Nordsachsen
- Subdivisions: 7

Government
  - Mayor (2022–29): Steffen Schwalbe (Ind.)

Area
  - Total: 39.92 km^{2} (15.41 sq mi)
- Elevation: 129 m (423 ft)

Population (2025-12-31)
  - Total: 5,474
  - Density: 137.1/km^{2} (355.2/sq mi)
- Time zone: UTC+01:00 (CET)
  - Summer (DST): UTC+02:00 (CEST)
- Postal codes: 04519
- Dialling codes: 034294, 034202
- Vehicle registration: TDO, DZ, EB, OZ, TG, TO
- Website: www.gemeinde-rackwitz.de

Rackwitz is a municipality in the district of Nordsachsen, in Saxony, Germany.

== Geography ==
=== Site, situation and location ===
Rackwitz is about 10 km north of Leipzig and 13 km south of Delitzsch.

The surrounding landscape belongs to the Leipzig Bay and is drained by the river Lober, a tributary of the Mulde. The lakes Schladitzer See and Werbeliner See, which were created from disused open-cast mines, are situated nearby.

Leipzig Trade Fair Center and Leipzig/Halle Airport are also in the vicinity.

=== Villages ===
Rackwitz municipality contains the following villages with populations in brackets:

Biesen (182); Brodenaundorf (40); Kreuma (162); Lemsel (313)	Podelwitz (466); Rackwitz (2,282) with Güntheritz; Zschortau (1,489)

Also within the municipality's area are the footprints of the now demolished villages Schladitz with Kömmlitz, Kattersnaundorf and Werbelin, on the sites of which are now lakes, formerly open-cast lignite mines.

== History ==
The Rackwitz area was settled by Slavs in prehistoric times. The name Rak means shrimp, and can be seen in the coat of arms. The town Rackwitz came to be after the merger of Rackwitz and Güntheritz. The oldest part of the present day municipality is Podelwitz, which was documented in 1250. Since 1349/50 Zschortau and Rackwitz were mentioned in documents. Brodenaundorf was mentioned in 1547.

At the start of the 15th Century, plague and famine decimated Rackwitz. The municipality was also plundered during the Thirty Years War. In 1692 trials for witchcraft took place in Rackwitz in which two witches were tried.

On June 21, 1871, a train crash killed 19 and injured 56 in the vicinity of Rackwitz.

=== Mergers and Annexations ===
Former municipality	Date	Comment
Biesen	1. July 1950	Merged into Zschortau
Brodenaundorf	1. July 1950	Merged into Zschortau
Güntheritz	between 1925 und 1939	Annexed by Rackwitz
Kattersnaundorf	1981	Demolished in 1981 to make way for the open-cast lignite mine Delitzsch-Southwest and thereby merged into Zschortau
Kömmlitz	1 April 1936	Merged into Schladitz, then demolished in 1986-89 for lignite mine
Kreuma	1 May 1974	Merged into Zschortau
Lemsel	1 March 1994	Merged into Zschortau
Podelwitz	1999	Merged into Rackwitz
Schladitz	1989	demolished in 1986-89 for lignite mine and thereby annexed by Rackwitz. Gives its name to the lake on the site of the lignite mine, known as Schladitzer Bucht.
Werbelin	1 January 1957	Merged with Kattersnaundorf, when Kattersnaudorf was demolished in 1981, Werbelin was merged into Zschortau, and was itself demolished in 1992 for the mine, giving its name to Werbeliner Lake, the lake on the site of the mine.
Zschortau	1 March 2004	Annexed by Rackwitz

=== Historical Population ===
Note that the population figures in the table below include the figures for other districts that were merged with Rackwitz at various points in time (see table above, thereby accounting for significant increases.

Historical Population of Rackwitz
Year	1818	1880	1895	1910	1925	1939	1946	1950	1964	1990	2000	2013	2015
Inhabitants	76	96	113	124	192	1055	1375	1329	1786	3228	3388	4916	4855

== Culture and Sights ==
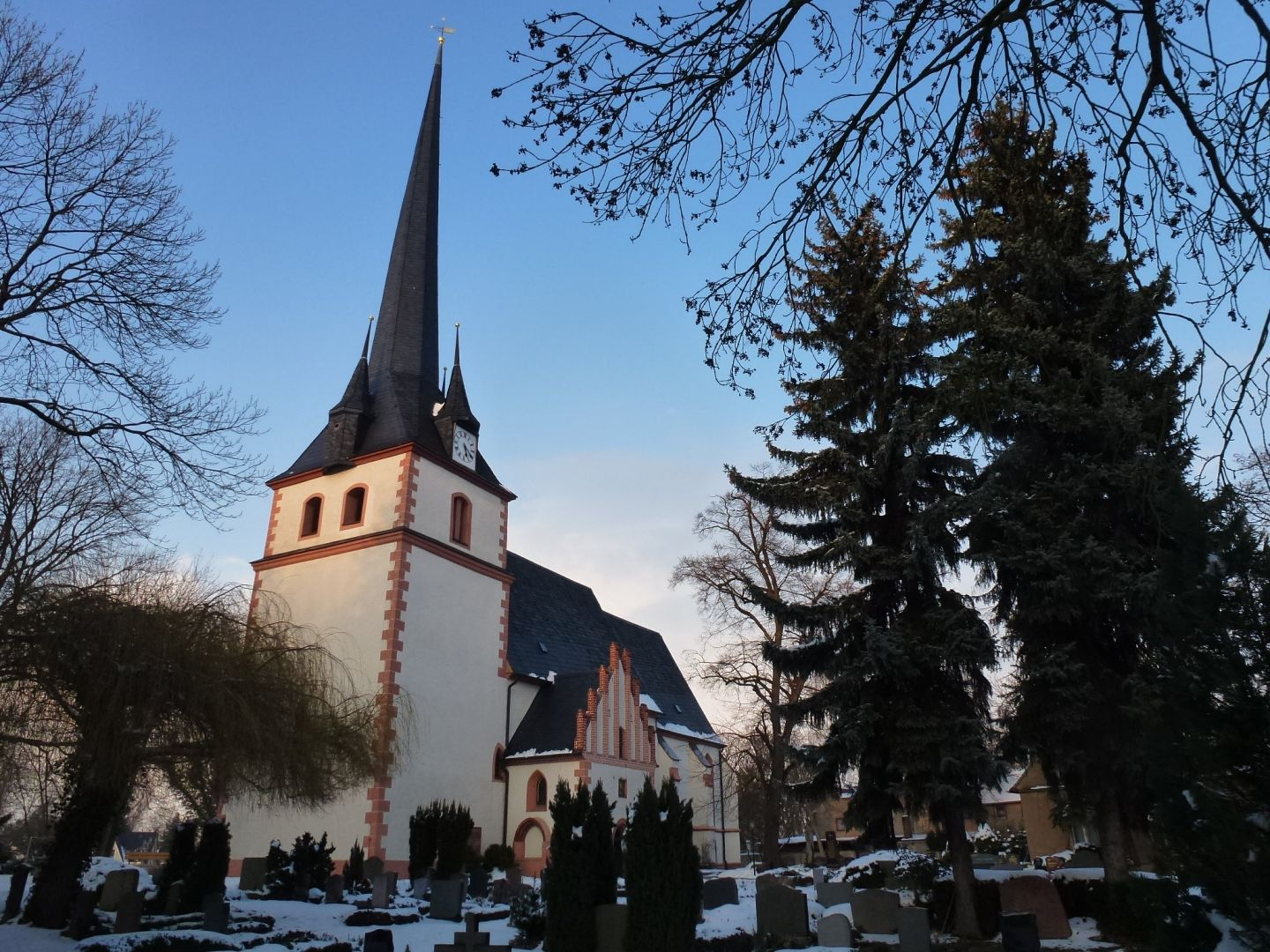
Podelwitz church

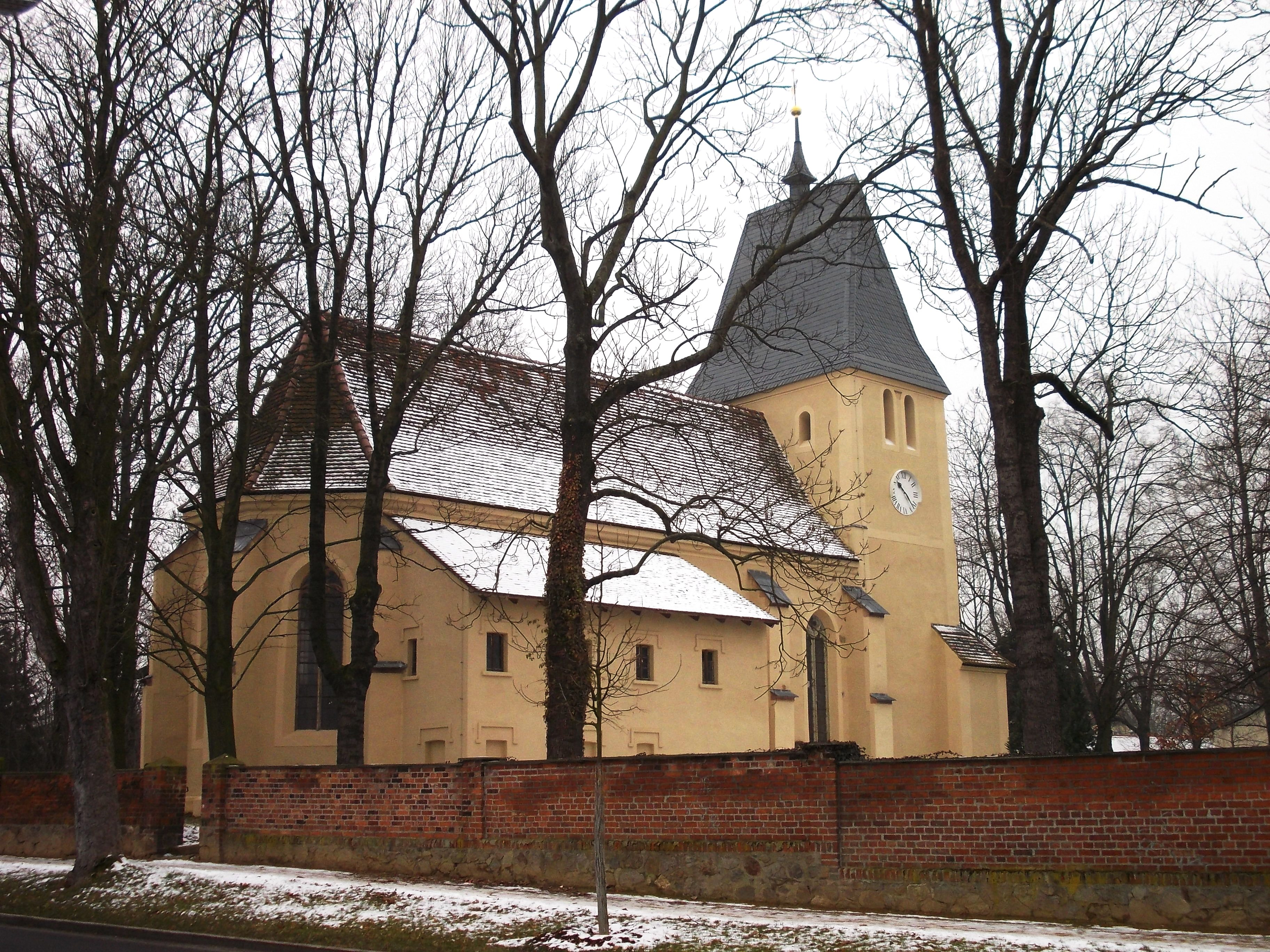
Church in Zschortau

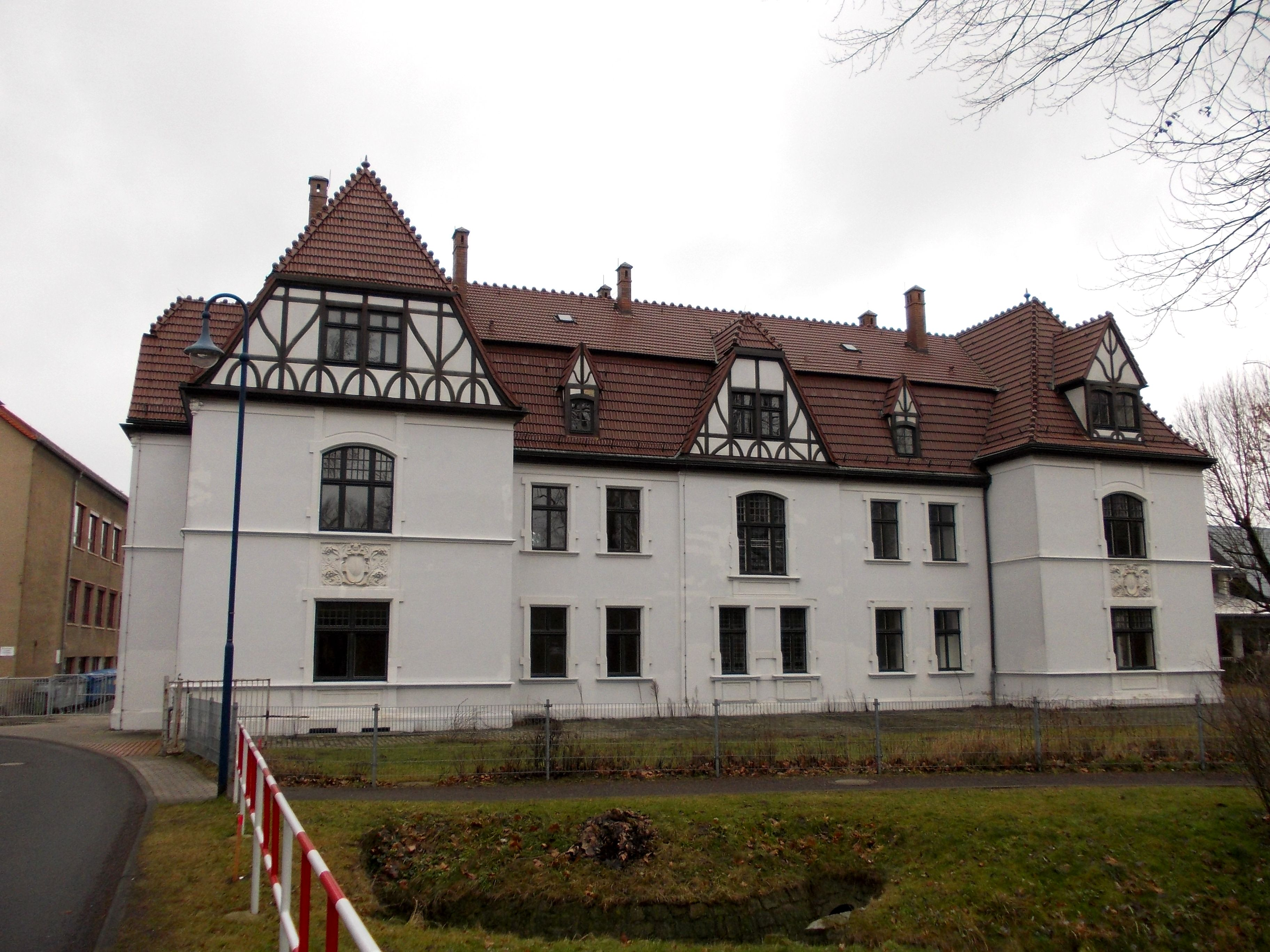
Herrenhaus of the Rittergutes Güntheritz

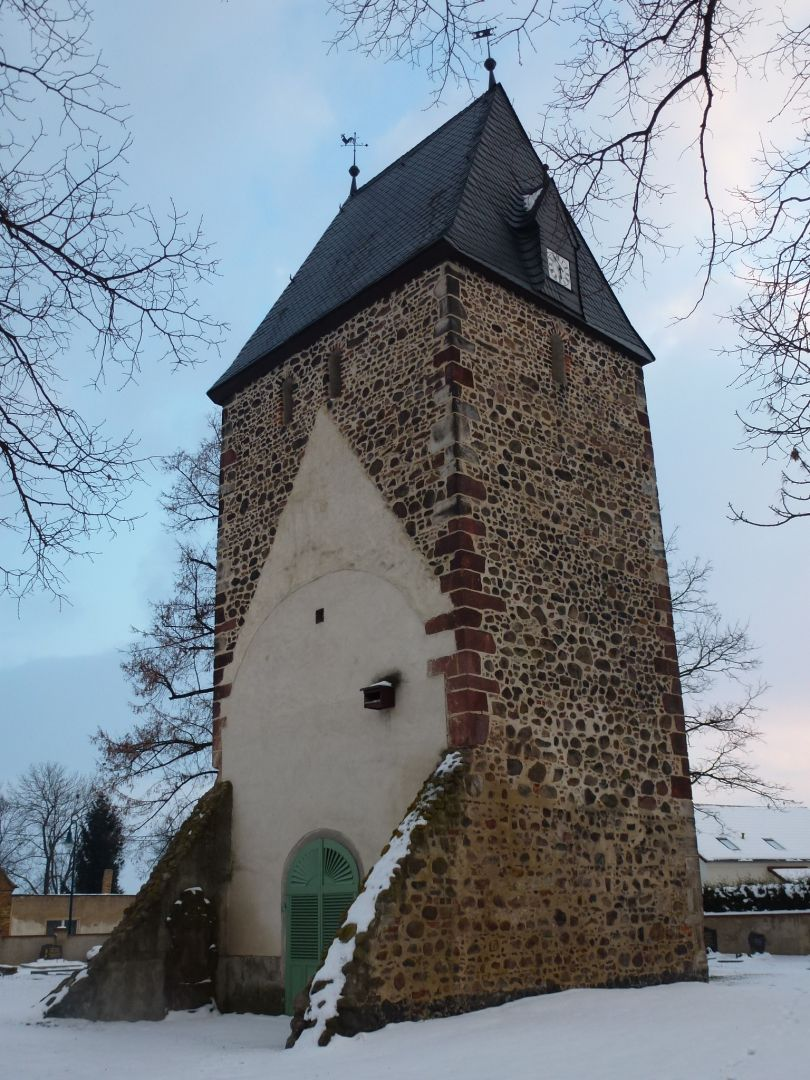
Church tower in Kreuma

=== Buildings ===
- The church in Podelwitz was gifted from Henry the Illustrious of the House of Wettin to the Teutonic Order on Christmas Eve 1250.
- The church in Zschortau contains the last remaining organ by Johann Scheibel, which was tested by Johann Sebastian Bach.
- Only the tower remains from the church in Kreuma.
- Castle in Zschortauer Park which is today an educational institution.
- Herrenhaus of the Rittergutes Güntheritz
