= Chemnitz =

- City
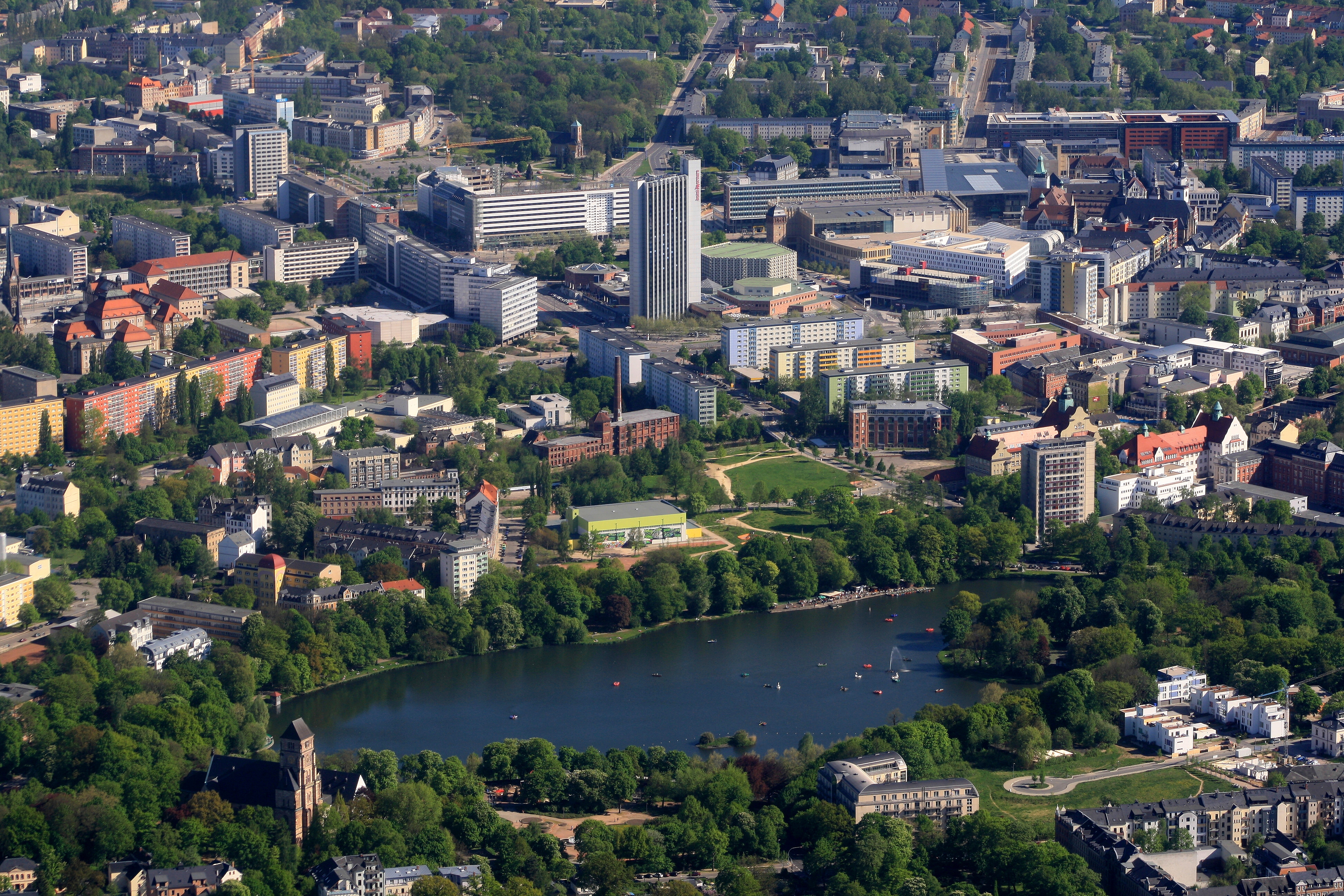
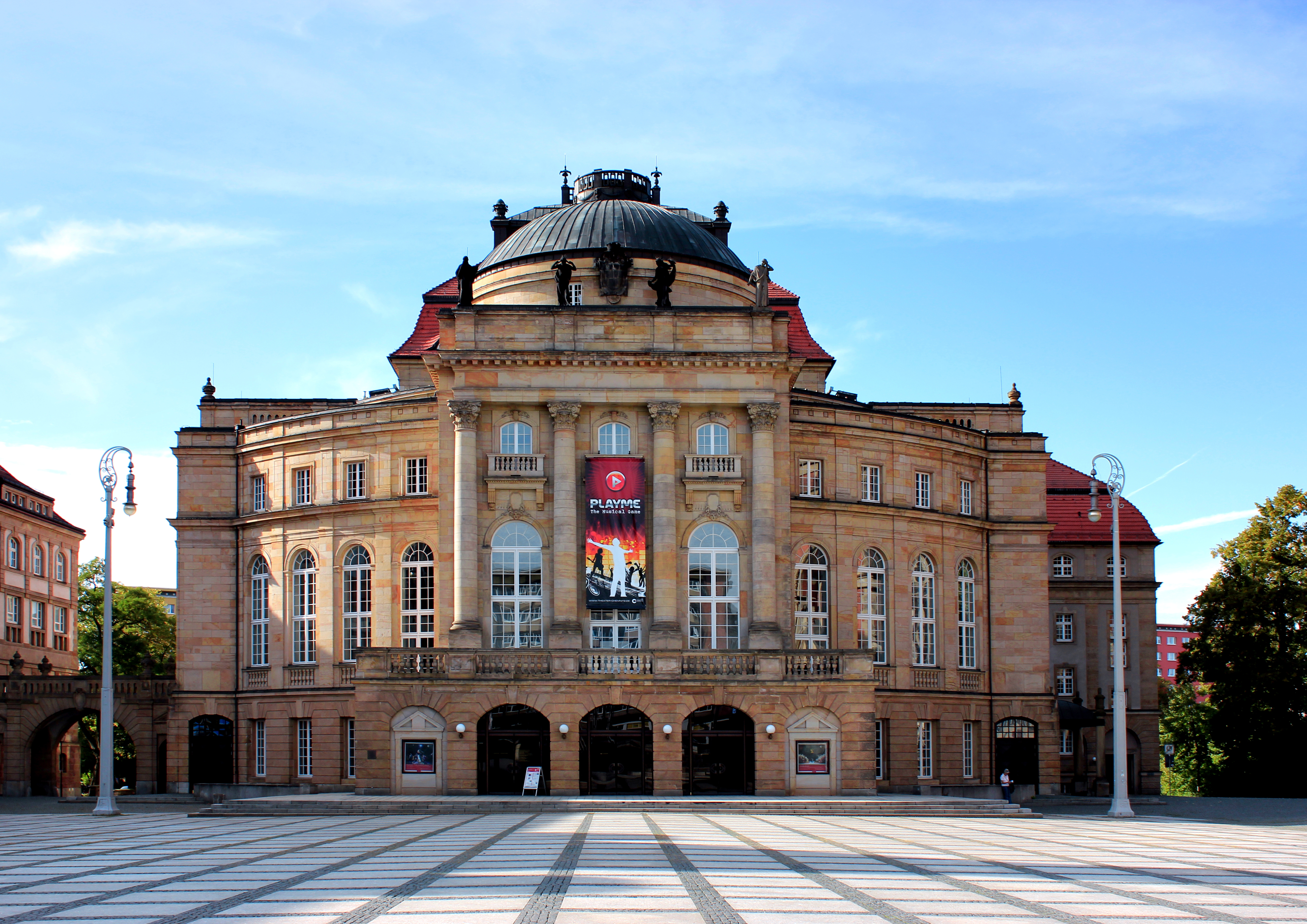
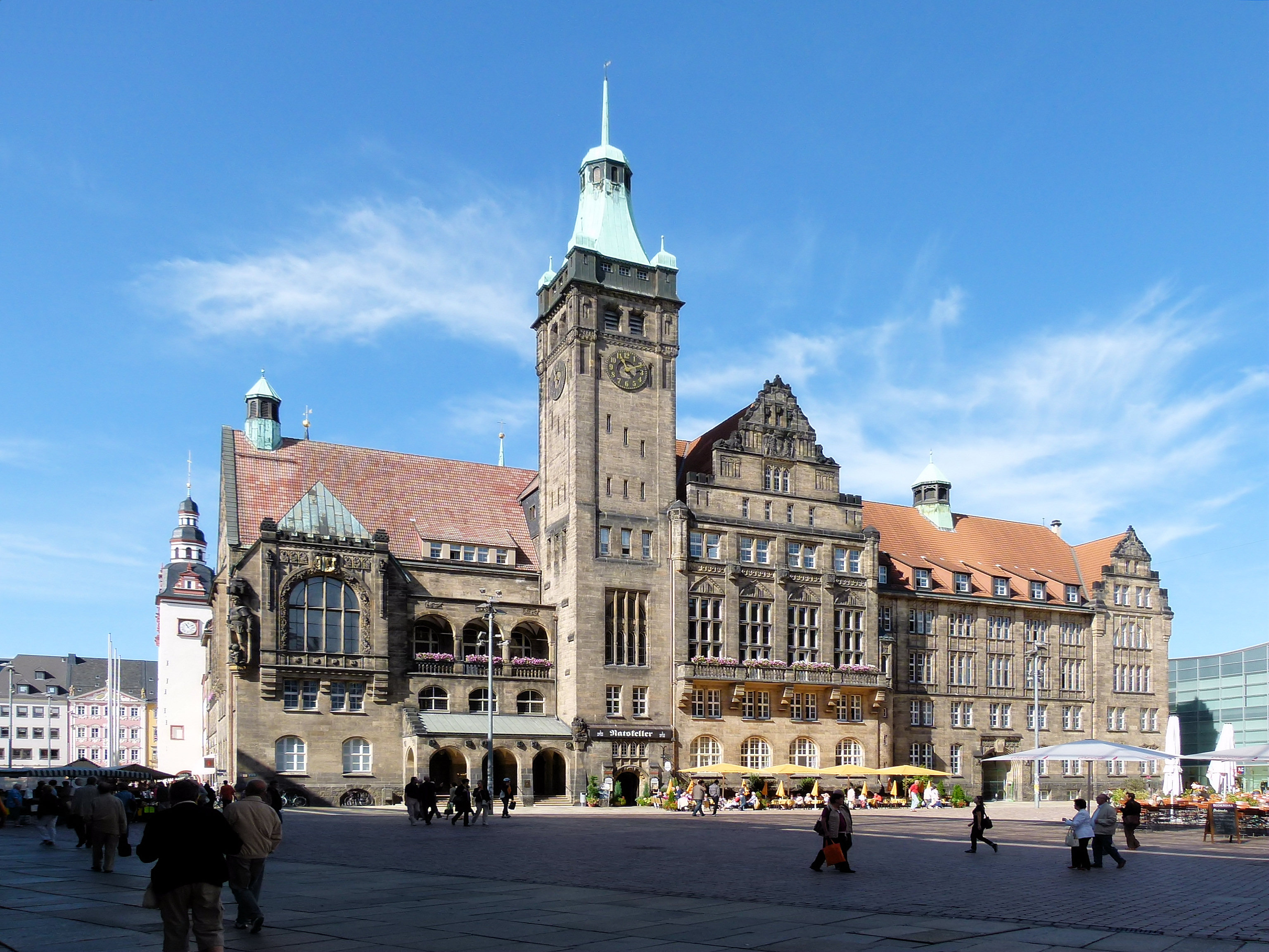
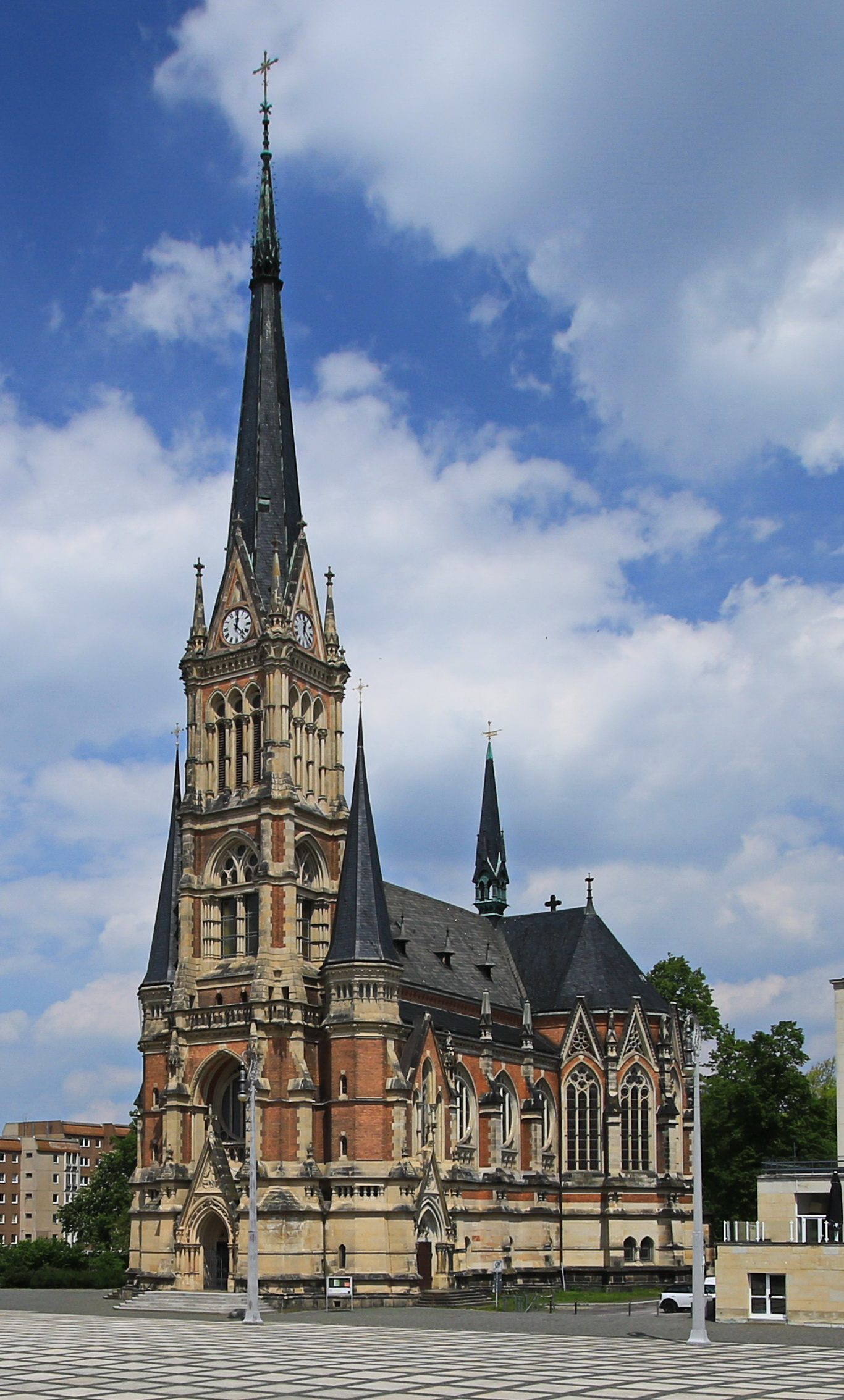
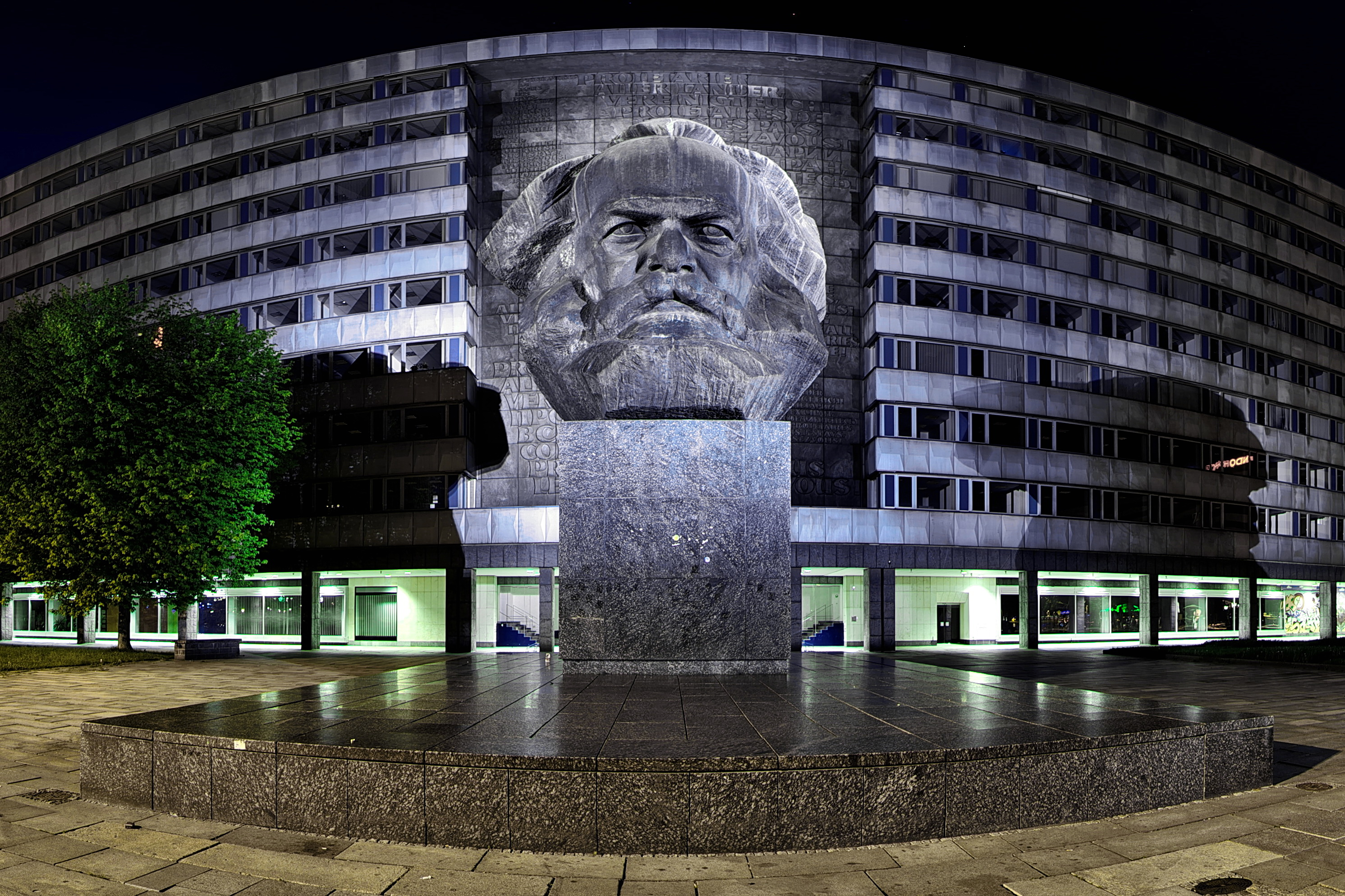
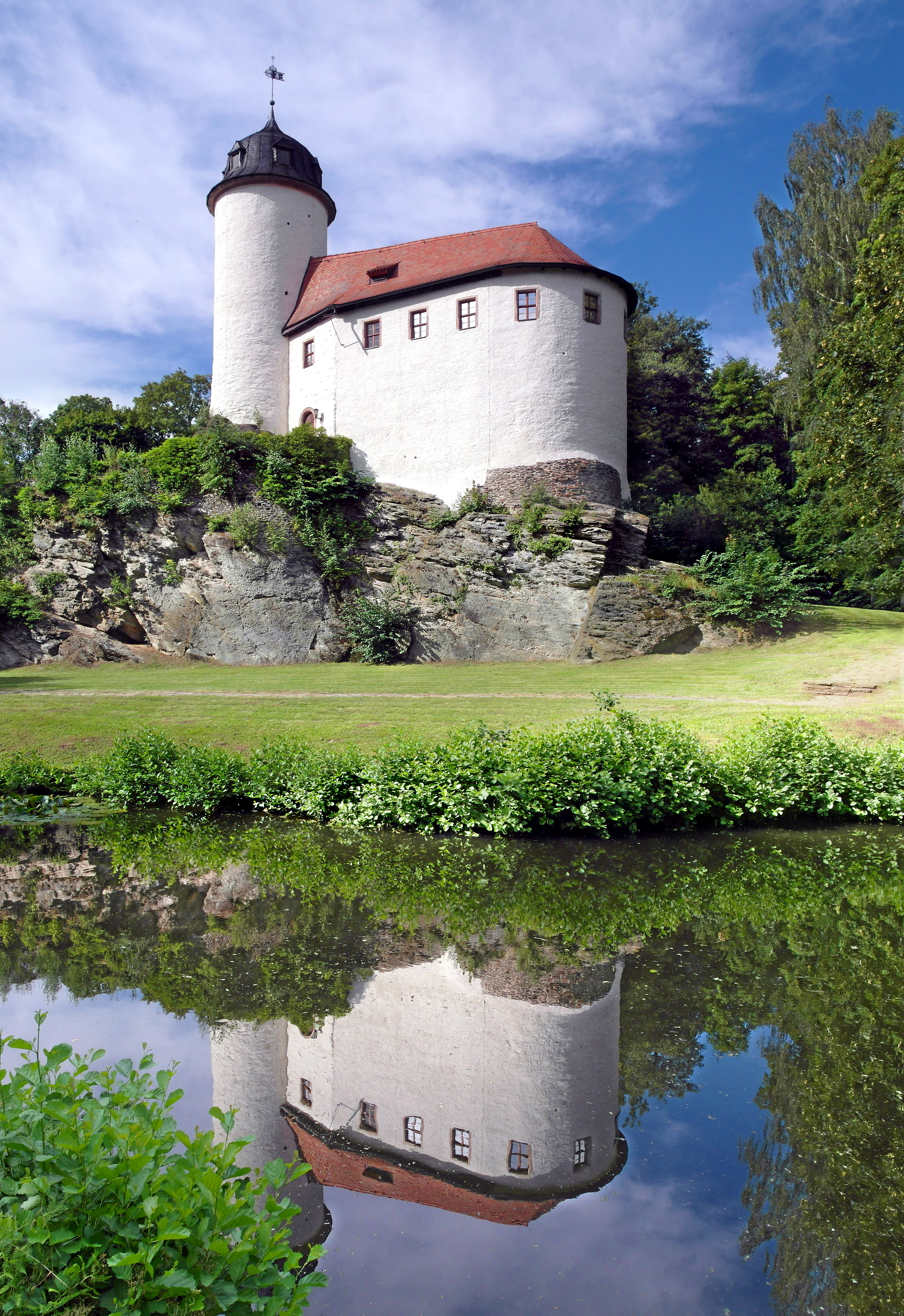
- View over Chemnitz Theater Chemnitz New City Hall Petrikirche Karl Marx Monument Rabenstein

- Flag Coat of arms
- Interactive map of Chemnitz
- Location within Germany Location within Saxony
- Coordinates: 50°50′N 12°55′E
- Country: Germany
- State: Saxony
- District: Urban district

Government
  - Mayor (2020–27): Sven Schulze (SPD)

Area
  - Total: 220.85 km^{2} (85.27 sq mi)
- Elevation: 296 m (971 ft)

Population (2025-12-31)
  - Total: 247,252
  - Density: 1,119.5/km^{2} (2,899.6/sq mi)
- Time zone: UTC+01:00 (CET)
  - Summer (DST): UTC+02:00 (CEST)
- Postal codes: 09001–09247
- Dialling codes: 0371 037200 (Wittgensdorf) 037209 (Einsiedel) 03722 (Röhrsdorf) 03726 (Euba)
- Vehicle registration: C
- Website: www.chemnitz.de

Chemnitz, (Note: German pronunciation: [ˈkɛmnɪts]) known as Karl-Marx-Stadt (Note: German pronunciation: [kaʁlˈmaʁksˌʃtat]; lit. 'Karl Marx City') from 1953 to 1990, is the third-largest city in the German state of Saxony after Leipzig and Dresden, and the fourth-largest city in the area of the former East Germany after (East) Berlin, Leipzig, and Dresden.

The city lies in the middle of a string of cities sitting in the densely populated northern foreland of the Elster and Ore Mountains, stretching from Plauen in the southwest via Zwickau, Chemnitz and Freiberg to Dresden in the northeast, and is part of the Central German Metropolitan Region. Located in the Ore Mountain Basin, the city is surrounded by the Ore Mountains to the south and the Central Saxon Hill Country to the north. The city stands on the Chemnitz River, which is formed through the confluence of the rivers Zwönitz and Würschnitz in the borough of Altchemnitz.

The name of the city as well as the names of the rivers are of Slavic origin. Chemnitz is the third-largest city in the Thuringian-Upper Saxon dialect area after Leipzig and Dresden. The city's economy is based on the service sector and manufacturing industry. Chemnitz University of Technology has around 10,000 students.

Chemnitz is known for its many industrial age buildings and monuments, and was the European Capital of Culture of 2025.

== Toponymy ==
Chemnitz is named after the river Chemnitz, the main tributary of the Zwickau Mulde. The word "Chemnitz" derives from the Slavic expression for "stone" (Upper Sorbian: kamjeń), which is the root of the Upper Sorbian designations for the river (Kamjenica; "stony [brook]"), as well as for the city itself (also Kamjenica). The term is composed of the stem kamjeń, and the Slavic feminine suffix -ica. The city is known in Czech as Saská Kamenice and in Polish sometimes as Kamienica Saska.

Chemnitz is one of many places worldwide whose name derives from the Slavic root kamen such as Kamianske and Kamianets-Podilskyi in Ukraine, Kamensk-Uralsky and Kamensk-Shakhtinsky and Kamenskoye in Russia, Kamienna Góra, Kamień Pomorski, Kamieńsk and Kamieniec Ząbkowicki in Poland, Kamenica (Kosovo), Kamenz (Kamjenc) (Germany), Kamenitsa (Bulgaria), Kamenický Šenov (Czech Republic), and Kamenac (Croatia). Of these, Chemnitz has the largest population.

== History ==
=== Medieval beginnings ===
The area was sparsely settled by Slavic tribes related to the modern Sorbs. The placename is first attested for the eponymous local river (1012/18: "Caminizi fluvium"). In 1143, King Conrad III of Germany confirmed the rights previously granted by Emperor Lothar III to a Benedictine monastery, including land ownership within a two-mile radius and permission to hold a royal public market ("forum publicum"). This document contains the first recorded mention of Chemnitz. Subsequently a settlement grew around the market. Around 1170, the town was granted the rights of a free imperial city by Emperor Frederick I.

=== Meissen and Saxony ===
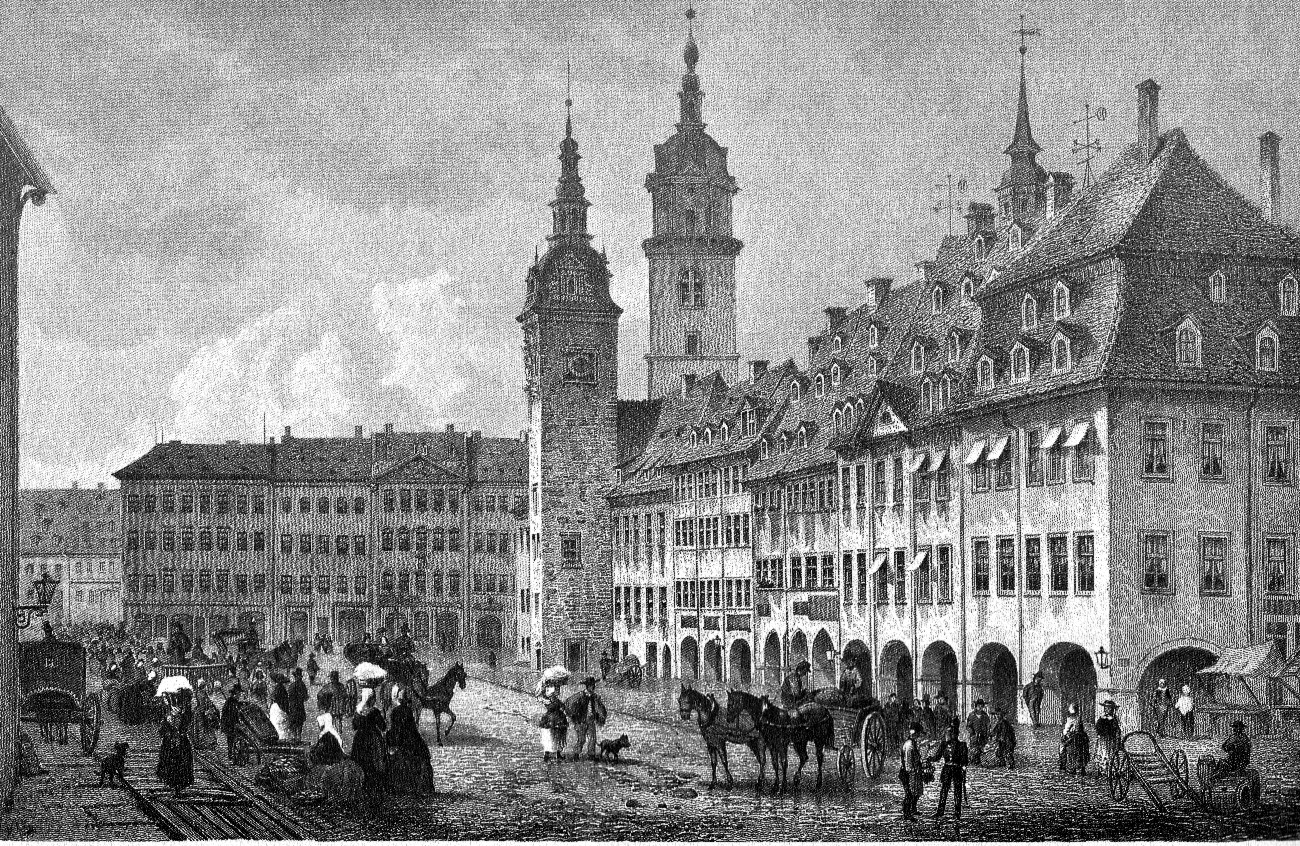
Chemnitz c. 1850

In 1307, the town became subordinate to the Margraviate of Meissen, the predecessor of the Saxon state. In 1356, the Margraviate was succeeded by the Electorate of Saxony. After receiving the bleaching privilege in 1357, Chemnitz developed into a regional centre of weaving, linen manufacturing, and textile trade. More than one-third of the population worked in textile production.

Geologist Georgius Agricola (1494–1555), author of several significant works on mining and metallurgy, including the landmark treatise De re metallica, became city physician of Chemnitz in 1533 and lived here until his death in 1555. In 1546, he was elected a Burgher of Chemnitz, and in the same year, was also appointed Burgomaster (lord mayor), serving again in 1547, 1551, and 1553. Despite having been a leading citizen of the city, when Agricola died in 1555, the Protestant Duke denied him burial in the city's cathedral due to Agricola's allegiance to his Roman Catholic faith. Agricola's friends arranged for his remains to be buried in more sympathetic Zeitz, approximately 50 km away.

In 1639, during the Thirty Years' War, the Swedish army defeated Saxon and Imperial forces at the Battle of Chemnitz.

In 1806, with the end of the Holy Roman Empire, the Electorate was renamed as the Kingdom of Saxony, and this survived until the revolutions of 1918, which followed the Armistice ending the First World War.

By the early 19th century, Chemnitz had become an industrial centre (sometimes called "the Saxon Manchester", German: Sächsisches Manchester, pronounced [ˈzɛksɪʃəs ˈmɛntʃɛstɐ]). Important industrial companies were founded by Richard Hartmann, Louis Schönherr and Johann von Zimmermann. Chemnitz became a centre of innovation in the Kingdom of Saxony and later in the German Reich. In 1913, Chemnitz had a population of 320,000 and, like Leipzig and Dresden, was larger at that time than today. After losing inhabitants due to the First World War, Chemnitz grew rapidly again and reached its all-time peak of 360,250 inhabitants in 1930. Thereafter, growth was stalled by the world economic crisis.

=== Weimar Republic ===
As a working-class industrial city, Chemnitz was a powerful centre of socialist political organisation after the First World War. At the foundation of the German Communist Party the local Independent Social Democratic Party of Germany voted by 1,000 votes to three to break from the party and join the Communist Party behind their local leaders, Fritz Heckert and Heinrich Brandler. In March 1919 the German Communist Party had over 10,000 members in the city of Chemnitz. Chemnitz was one of the big German industrial centres. Due to the export traffic a modern marshalling yard was erected in 1929 in Chemnitz-Hilbersdorf. At that time it was a leading city in the European textile market. Auto Union (today Audi) was founded in 1932 in Chemnitz.

=== World War II ===
Allied bombing destroyed 41 percent of the built-up area of Chemnitz during the Second World War. Chemnitz contained factories that produced military hardware and a Flossenbürg forced labor subcamp (500 female inmates) for Astra-Werke AG. The oil refinery was a target for bombers during the Oil Campaign of World War II, and Operation Thunderclap attacks included the following raids:

- 14/15 February 1945: The first major raid on Chemnitz used 717 RAF bombers, but due to cloud cover most bombs fell over open countryside.
- 2/3–5 March: USAAF bombers attacked the marshalling yards.
- 5 March: 705 RAF bombers attacked.

The city was occupied by Soviet troops on 8 May 1945.

The headquarters of the auto manufacturer Auto Union was based in Chemnitz from 1932 and its buildings were badly damaged. At the end of the war, the company's executives fled and relocated the company to Ingolstadt, Bavaria, where it evolved into Audi, now a brand within the Volkswagen group.

The World War II bombings left most of the city centre in ruins and post-war, the East German reconstruction included large low-rise (and later high-rise Plattenbau) housing. Some tourist sites were reconstructed during the East German era and after German reunification. Today over 50% of the city´s buildings date back to before 1950.

=== German Democratic Republic ===
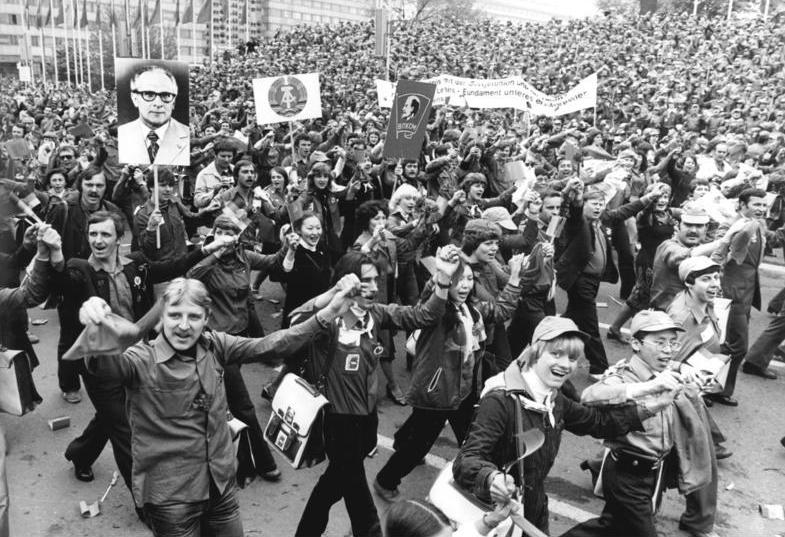
Karl-Marx-Stadt in May 1980, during the German Democratic Republic – Soviet Union Friendship Festival

After the dissolution of the Länder (states) in the German Democratic Republic (GDR) in 1952, Chemnitz became seat of a district (German: Bezirk). On 10 May 1953, the city was renamed by decision of the East German government to German: Karl-Marx-Stadt (English: Karl Marx City) after Karl Marx, in recognition of its industrial heritage and the Karl Marx Year marking the 135th anniversary of his birth and the 70th anniversary of his death. GDR Prime Minister Otto Grotewohl said:

The people who live here do not look back, but look forward to a new and better future. They look at socialism. They look with love and devotion to the founder of the socialist doctrine, the greatest son of the German people, to Karl Marx. I hereby fulfill the government's decision. I carry out the solemn act of renaming the city and declare: From now on, this city bears the proud and mandatory name Karl-Marx-Stadt.

In June 1953, workers of Chemnitz were part of the East German uprising of 1953. After the city centre was destroyed in World War II, the East German authorities attempted to rebuild it to symbolise the conceptions of urban development of a socialist city. The layout of the city centre at that time was rejected in favour of a new road network. However, the original plans were not completed. In addition, the rapid development of housing took priority over the preservation of old buildings. So in the 1960s and 1970s, both in the centre as well as the periphery, large areas were built in Plattenbau apartment-block style, for example Yorckstraße. The old buildings of the period, which still existed especially in the Kassberg, Chemnitz-Sonnenberg and Chemnitz-Schloßchemnitz quarters, were neglected and fell increasingly into dereliction.

=== After reunification ===
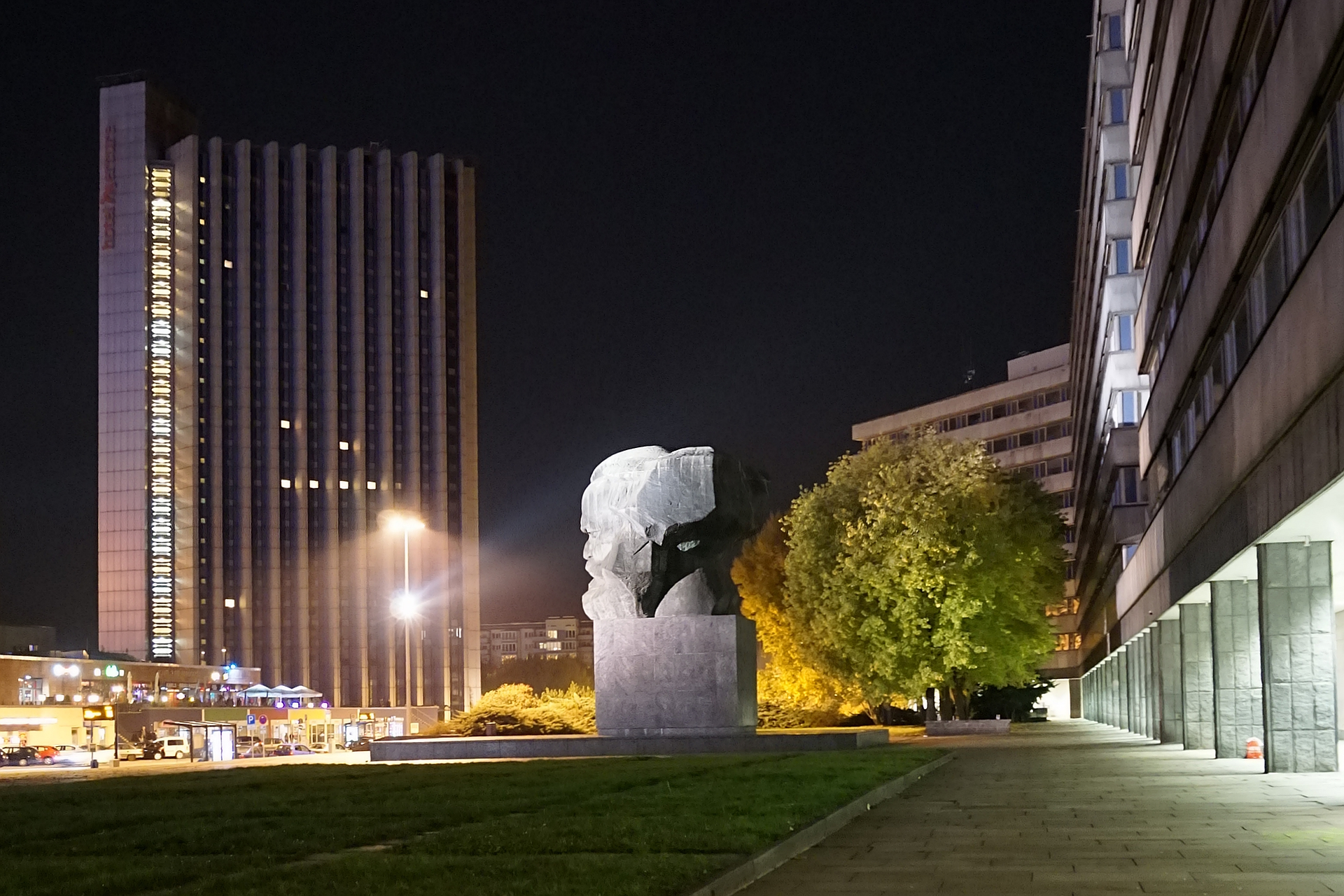
Chemnitz at night, October 2015

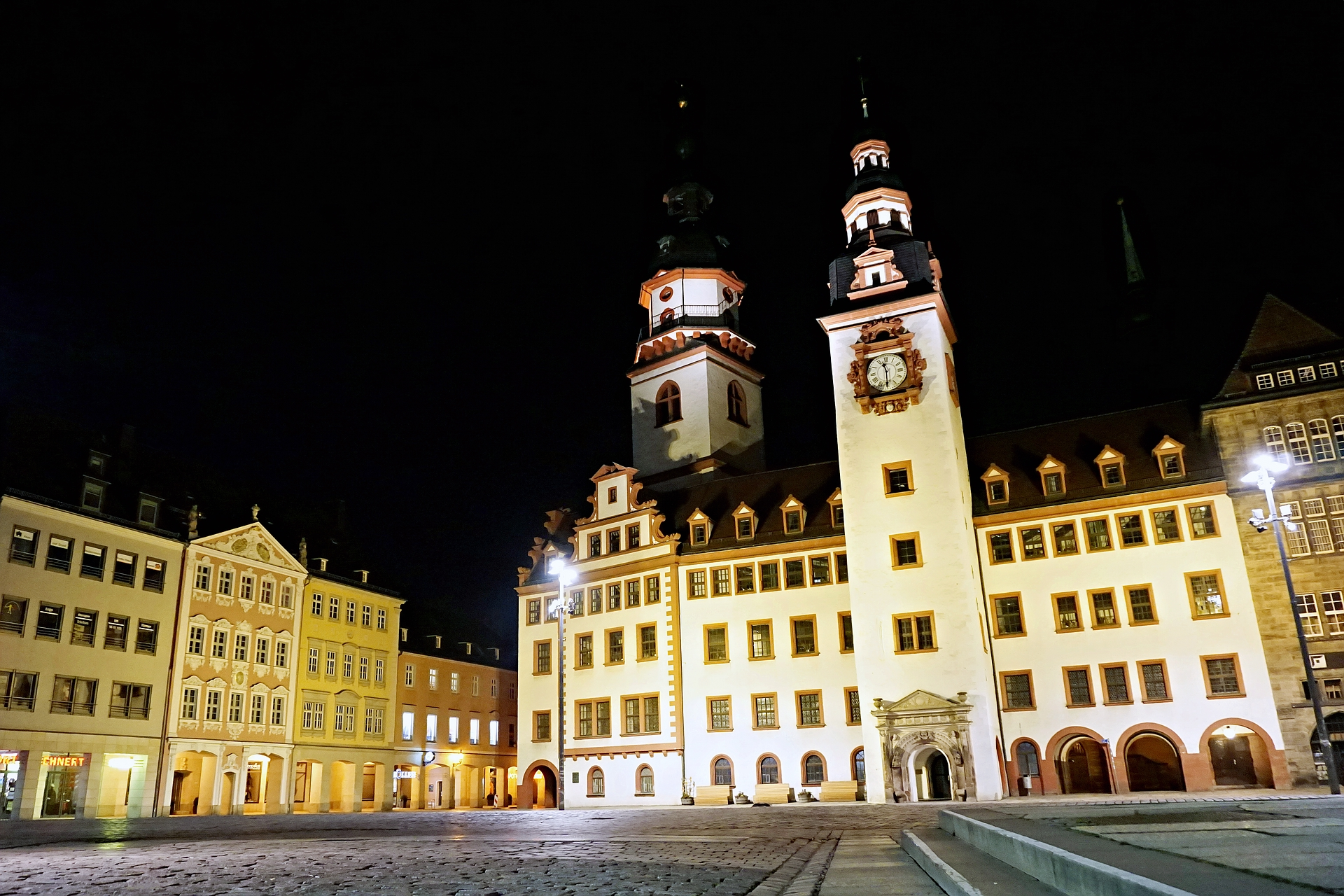
The restored market square of Chemnitz

On 23 April 1990, a referendum on the future name of the city was held: 76% of the voters voted for the old name "Chemnitz". On 1 June 1990, the city was officially renamed.

After the reunification of Germany on 3 October 1990, the city of Chemnitz faced several difficult tasks. Many inhabitants migrated to the former West Germany, and unemployment in the region increased sharply; in addition, Chemnitz did not have adequate shopping facilities, but this was increasingly demanded. Large shopping centers were constructed around the city's periphery in the early 1990s.

Chemnitz is the only major German city whose centre was re-planned after 1990, similar to the reconstruction of several other German cities in the immediate post-war years. Plans for the recovery of a compressed city centre around the historic town hall in 1991 led to an urban design competition. This was announced internationally by the city and carried out with the help of the partner city of Düsseldorf. The mooted project on an essentially unused area of the former city would be comparable in circumference to the Potsdamer Platz in Berlin.

Numerous internationally renowned architects such as Hans Kollhoff, Helmut Jahn and Christoph Ingenhoven provided designs for a new city centre. The mid-1990s began the development of the inner city brownfield around the town hall to a new town. In Chemnitz city, more than 66,000 square meters of retail space have emerged. With the construction of office and commercial buildings on the construction site "B3" at the Düsseldorf court, the last gap in 2010 was closed in the city centre image. The intensive development included demolition of partially historically valuable buildings from the period and was controversial. Between 1990 and 2007, more than 250 buildings were leveled.

In late August 2018, the city was the site of a series of protests that an estimated 8,000 right-wing and nationalist protestors and an estimated 1,500 left-wing counter-protesters attended, with violent clashes occurring between them, leading to injuries.

In 2020, the Stefan Heym Forum opened. In 2024, Chemnitz became the site of the Federal Hydrogen and Mobility Innovation Center (HIC), with operations beginning in 2025. In 2025, Chemnitz served as the European Capital of Culture, and the Karl Schmidt-Rottluff Art Museum opened at his birthplace in Chemnitz-Rottluff.

== Culture and sights ==
The city won the bid to be one of the two European Capitals of Culture (in 2025) on 28 October 2020, beating Hanover, Hildesheim, Magdeburg and Nuremberg.

Theater Chemnitz offers a variety of theatre: opera (opera house from 1909), plays, ballet and Figuren (puppets), and runs concerts by the orchestra Robert-Schumann-Philharmonie (founded 1832).

Tourist sights include the Kassberg neighborhood with 18th and 19th century buildings and the Karl Marx Monument by Lev Kerbel, nicknamed Nischel (a Saxon dialect word for head) by the locals. Landmarks include the Old Town Hall with its Renaissance portal (15th century), the castle on the site of the former monastery, and the area around the opera house and the old university. The most conspicuous landmark is the red tower built in the late 12th or early 13th century as part of the city wall.

The Chemnitz petrified forest is located in the courtyard of Kulturkaufhaus Tietz. It is one of the very few in existence, and dates back several million years (details shown in the Museum of Natural Sciences "Museum für Naturkunde Chemnitz", founded 1859). Also within the city limits, in the district of Rabenstein, is the smallest castle in Saxony, Rabenstein Castle.

The city has changed considerably since German reunification. Most of its industry is now gone and the core of the city has been rebuilt with many shops as well as large shopping centres.

The Chemnitz Industrial Museum is an Anchor Point of ERIH, the European Route of Industrial Heritage. Additional unique industrial monuments are located at the "Schauplatz Eisenbahn" (Saxon Railway Museum and Museum of Technology Rope Shunting System) in Chemnitz-Hilbersdorf. The State Museum of Archaeology Chemnitz opened in 2014 and is located in the former Schocken Department Stores (architect: Erich Mendelsohn; opening of the department store: 1930).

The Museum Gunzenhauser, formerly a bank, opened on 1 December 2007. Alfred Gunzenhauser, who lived in Munich, had a collection of some 2,500 pieces of modern art, including many paintings and drawings by Otto Dix, Karl Schmidt-Rottluff and others. The other great art museum in Chemnitz is located near central railway station, it is called "Museum am Theaterplatz" (erected 1909 as "König-Albert-Museum"). The Botanischer Garten Chemnitz is a municipal botanical garden, and the Arktisch-Alpiner Garten der Walter-Meusel-Stiftung is a non-profit garden specializing in arctic and alpine plants. The "Villa Esche" (Henry-van-de-Velde-museum) is located near the city center. This historical house was built in 1902 in art-nouveau-style by van de Velde. In Chemnitz-Rottluff the Karl Schmidt-Rottluff museum is located.

Chemnitz is home of the Schlingel International Film Festival, a yearly festival created in 1996 and that focuses on cinema for young audiences.

=== Image gallery ===
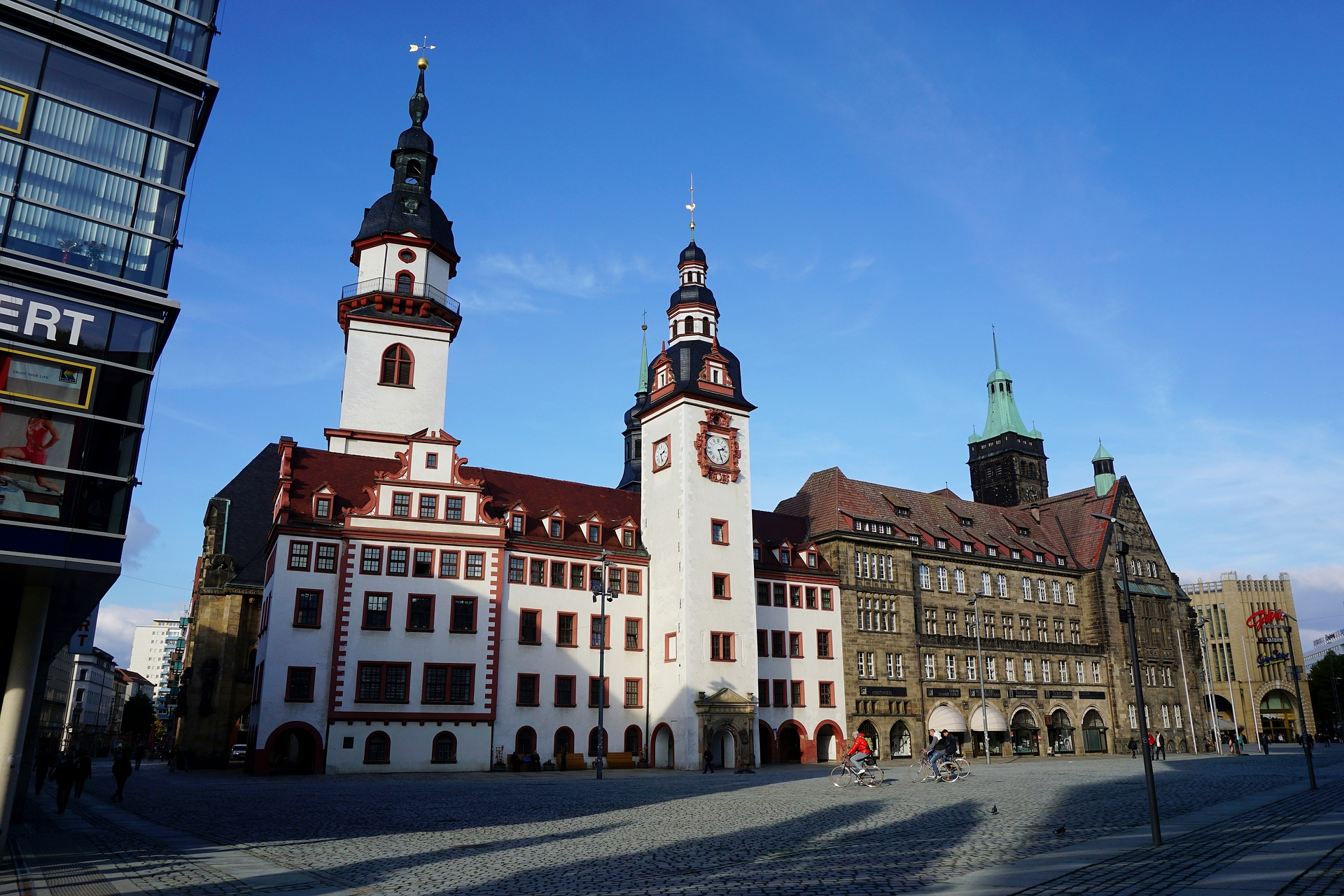
Old and new city hall

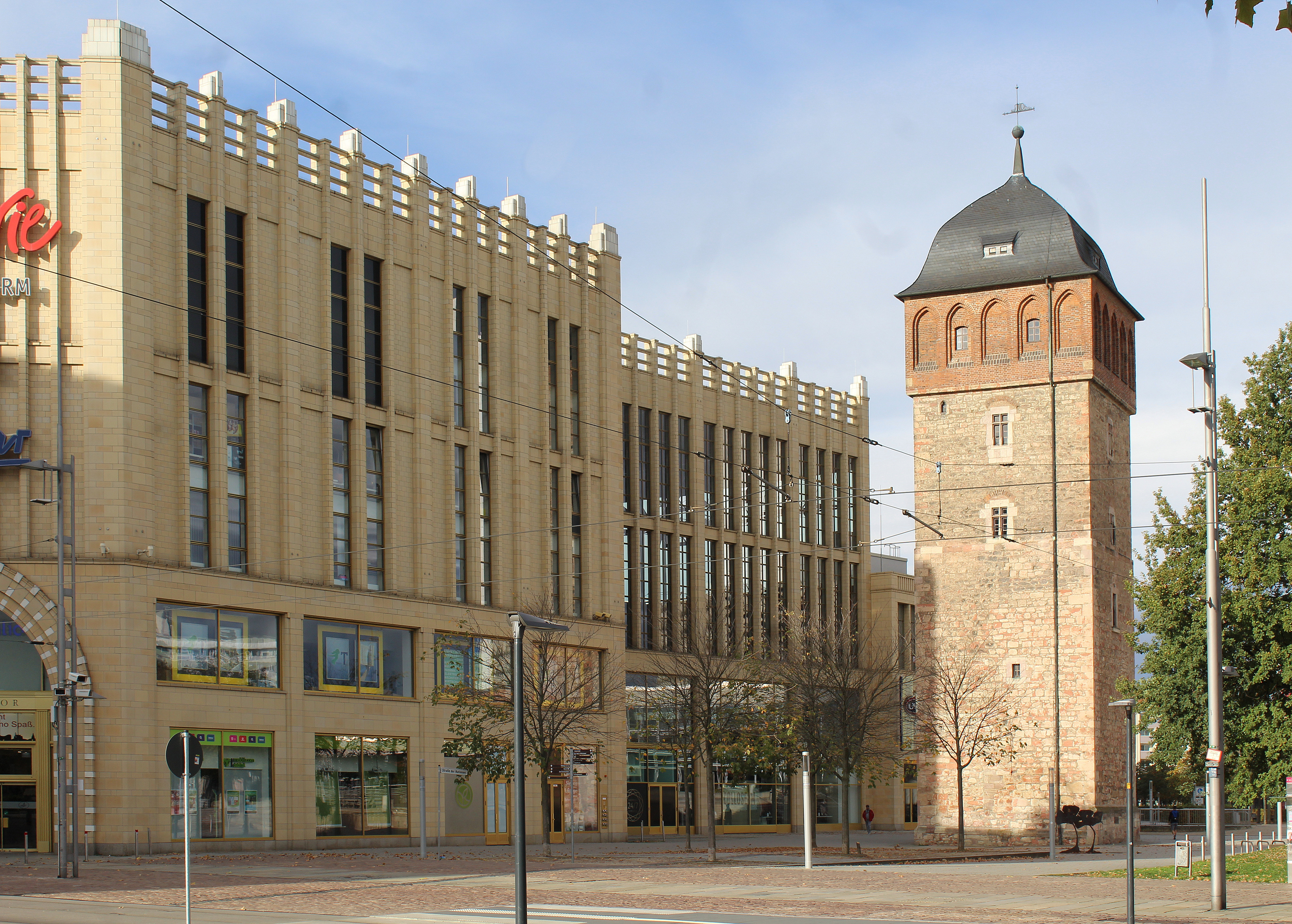
Roter Turm (Red Tower)

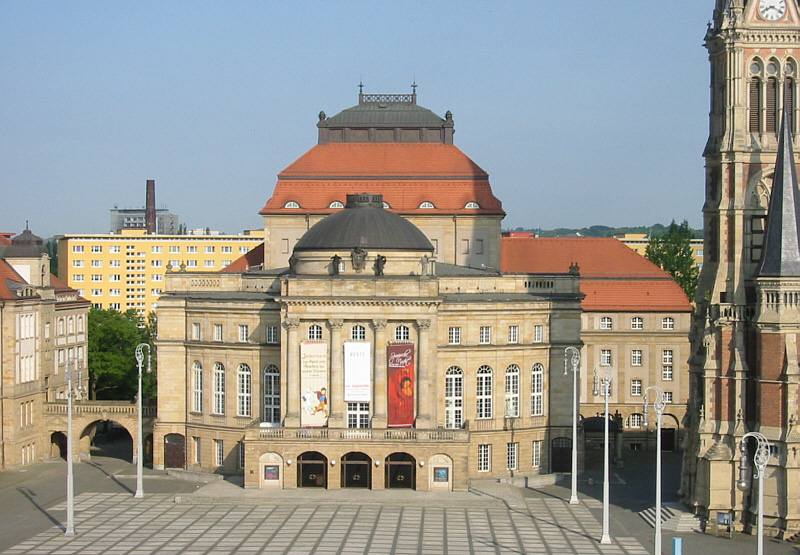
Chemnitz Opera at Opernplatz

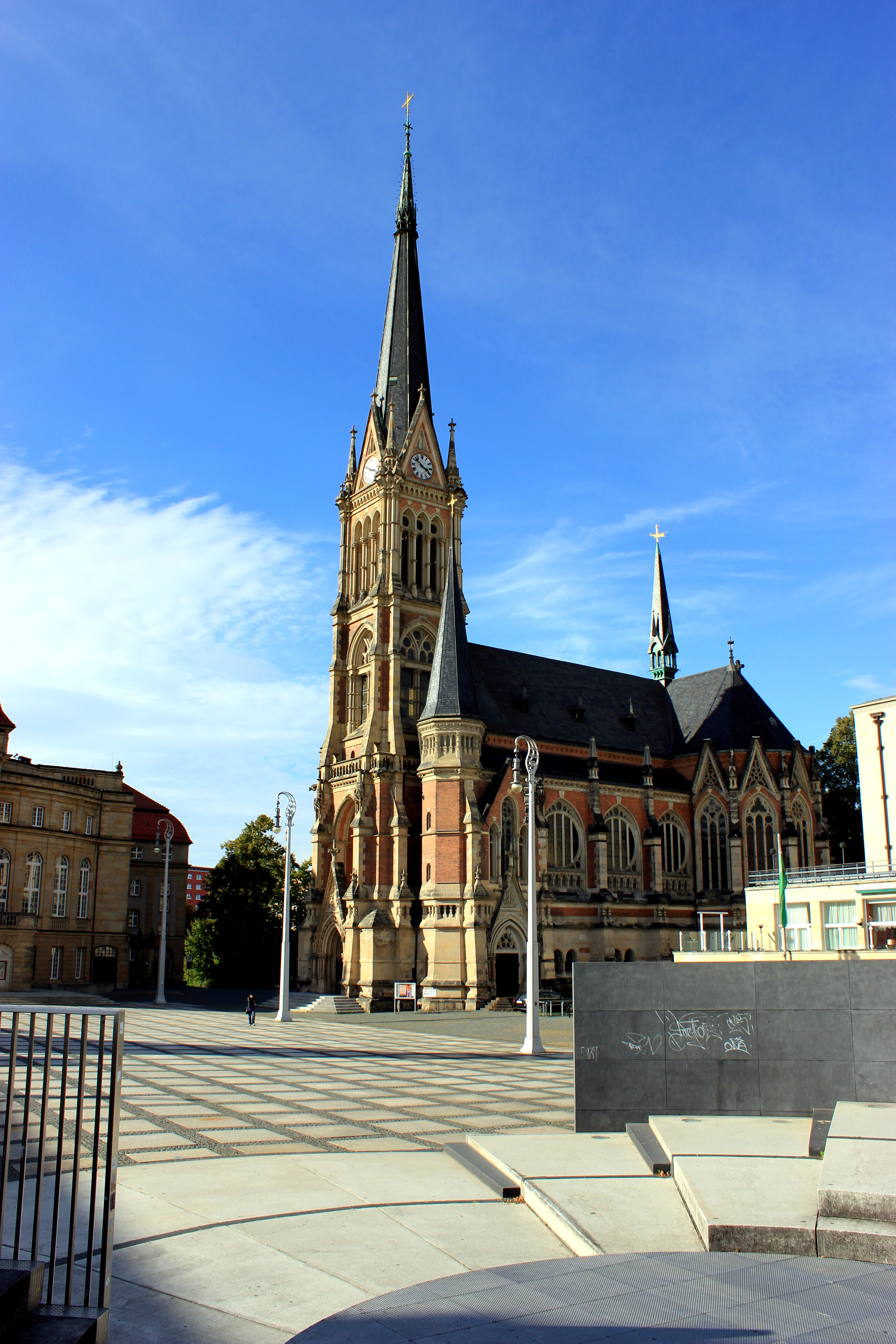
St. Petri church

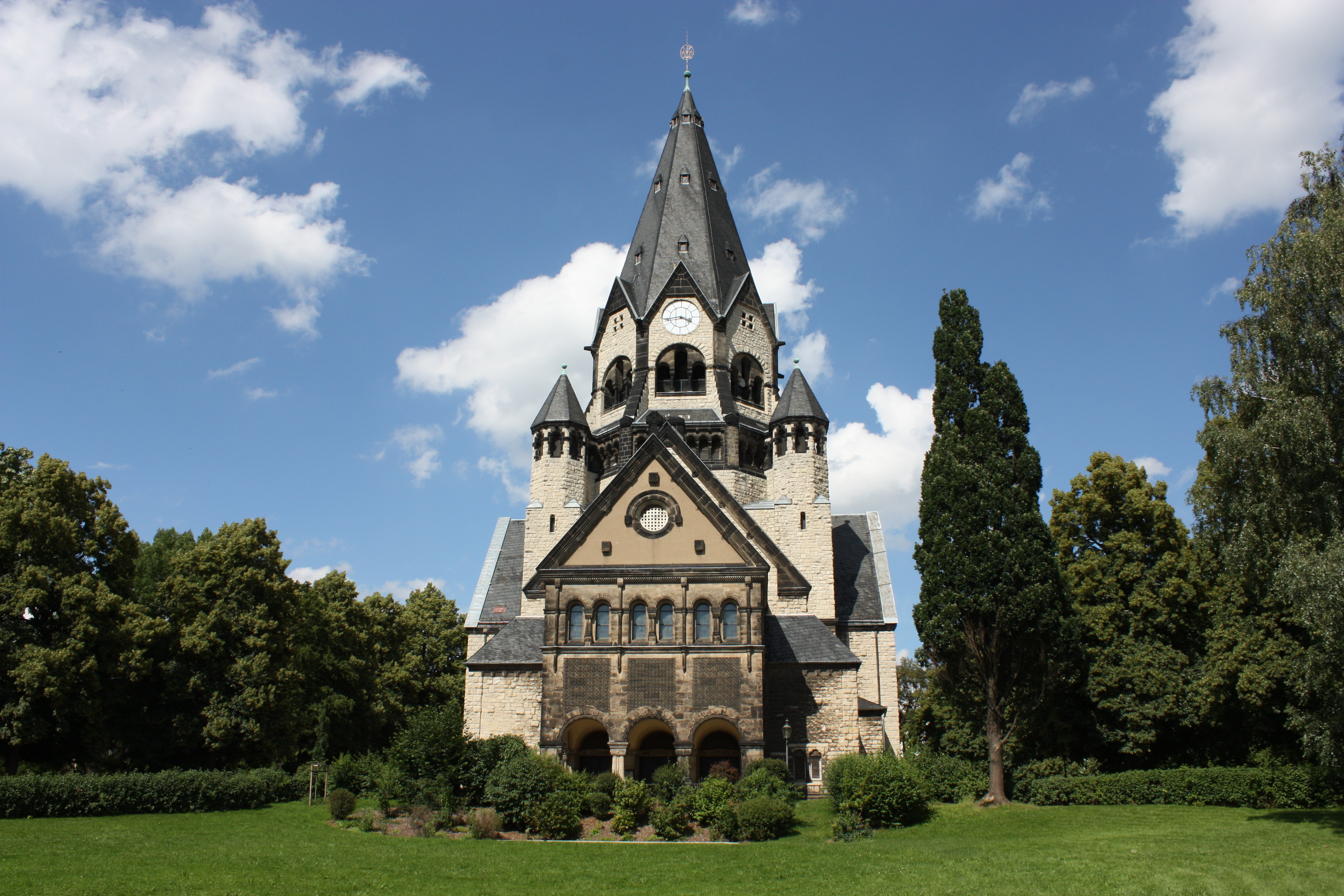
Lutheran church

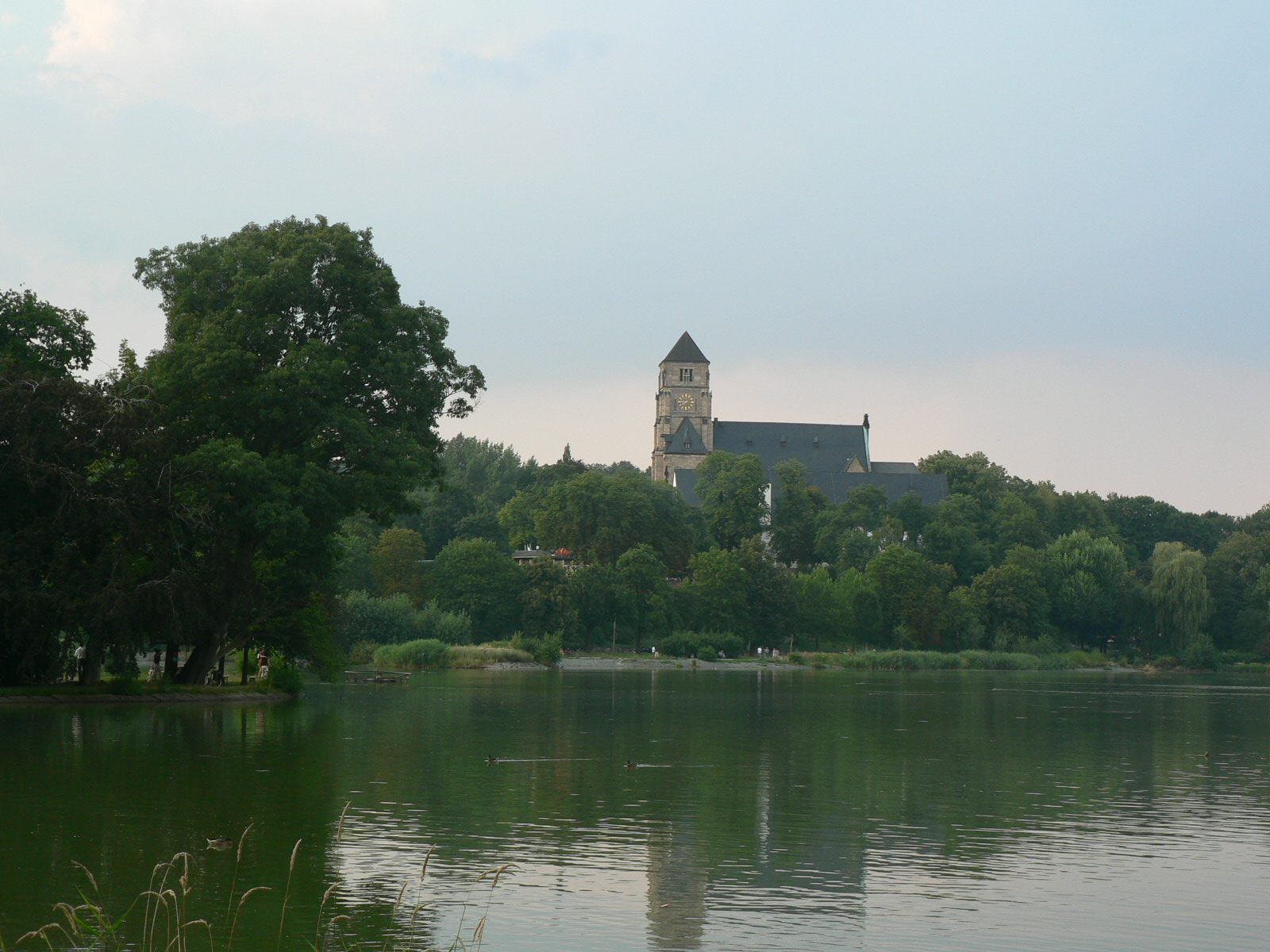
Castle church over the Castle Lake

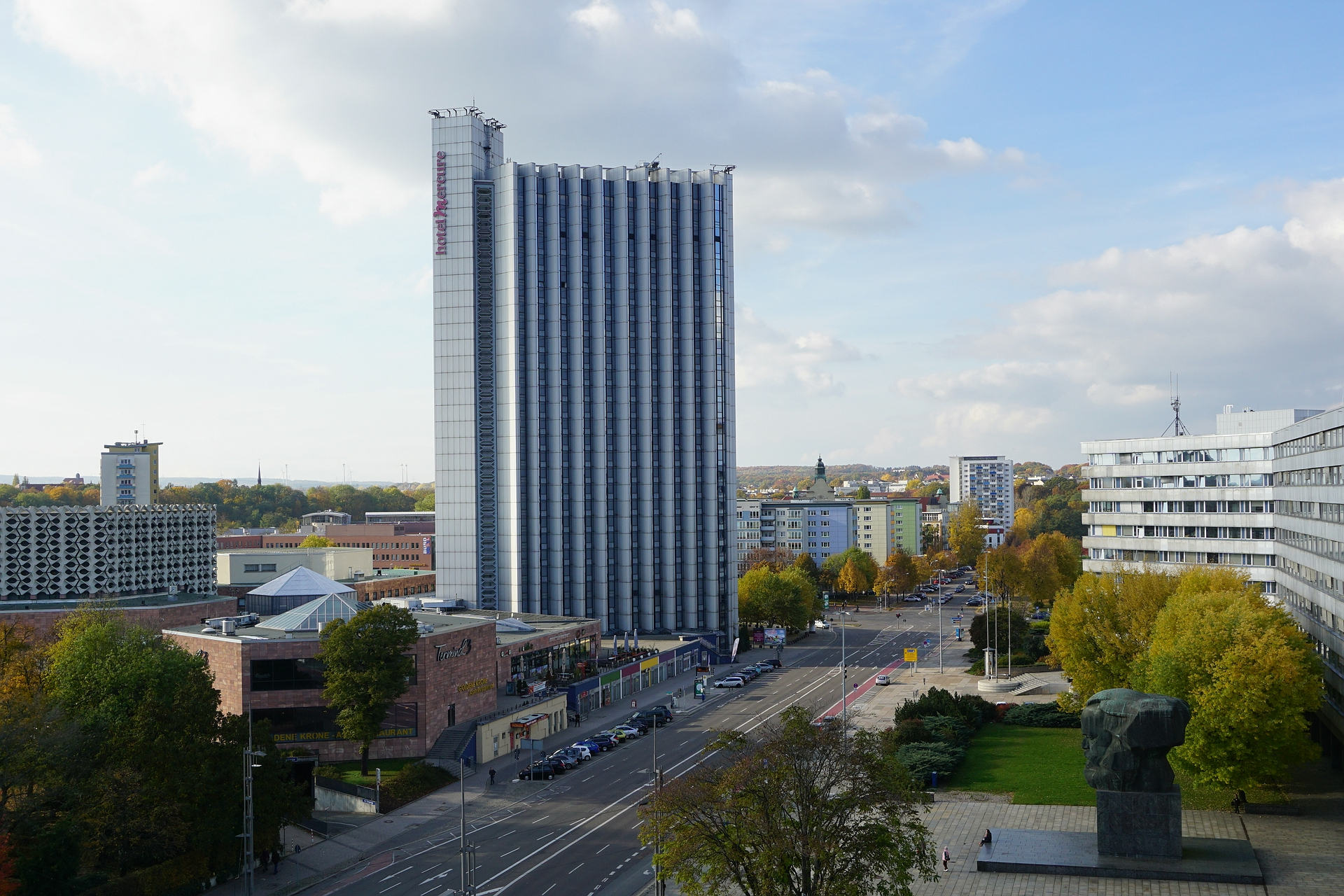
The Mercure Hotel, tallest building in Chemnitz

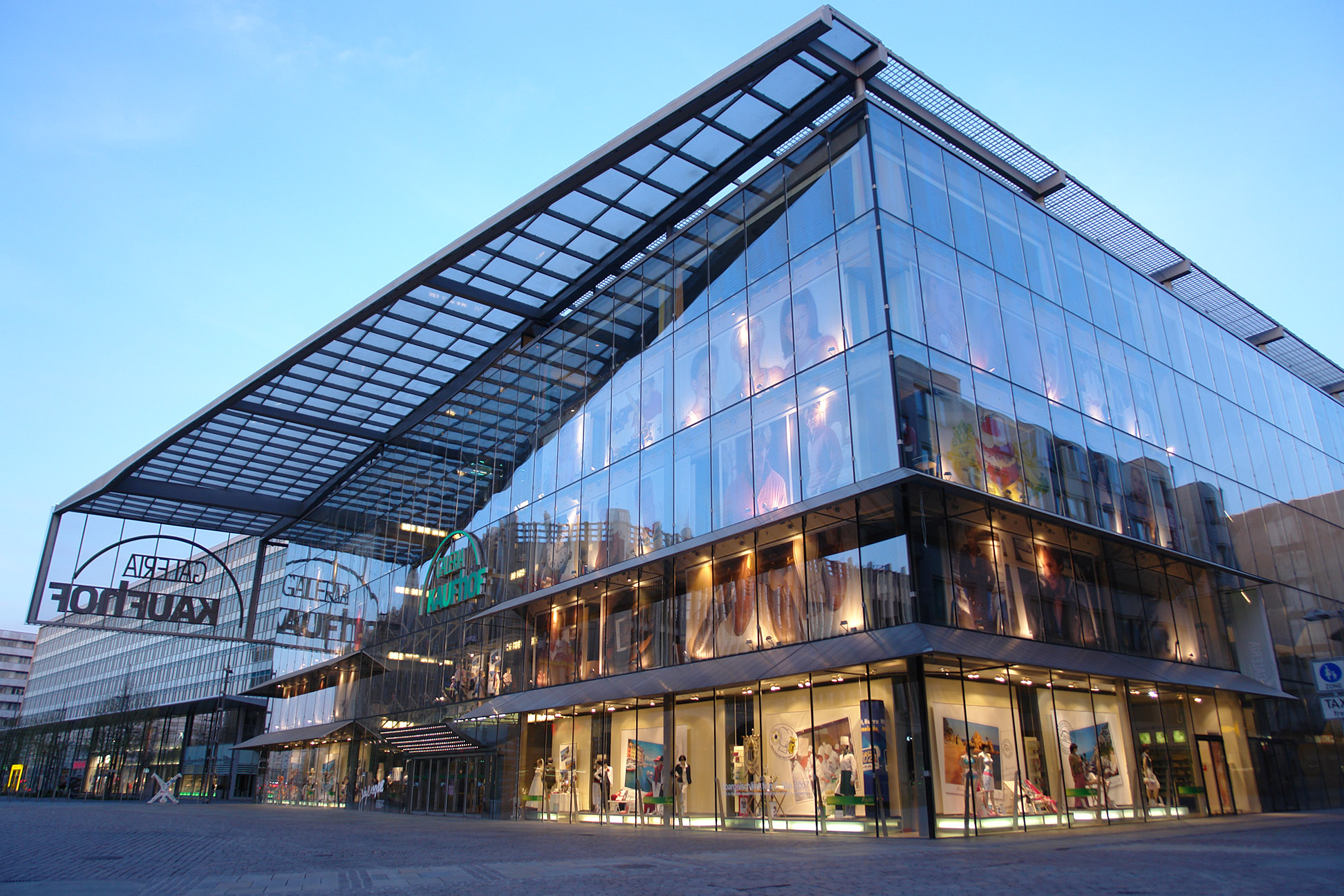
The Transparent department store

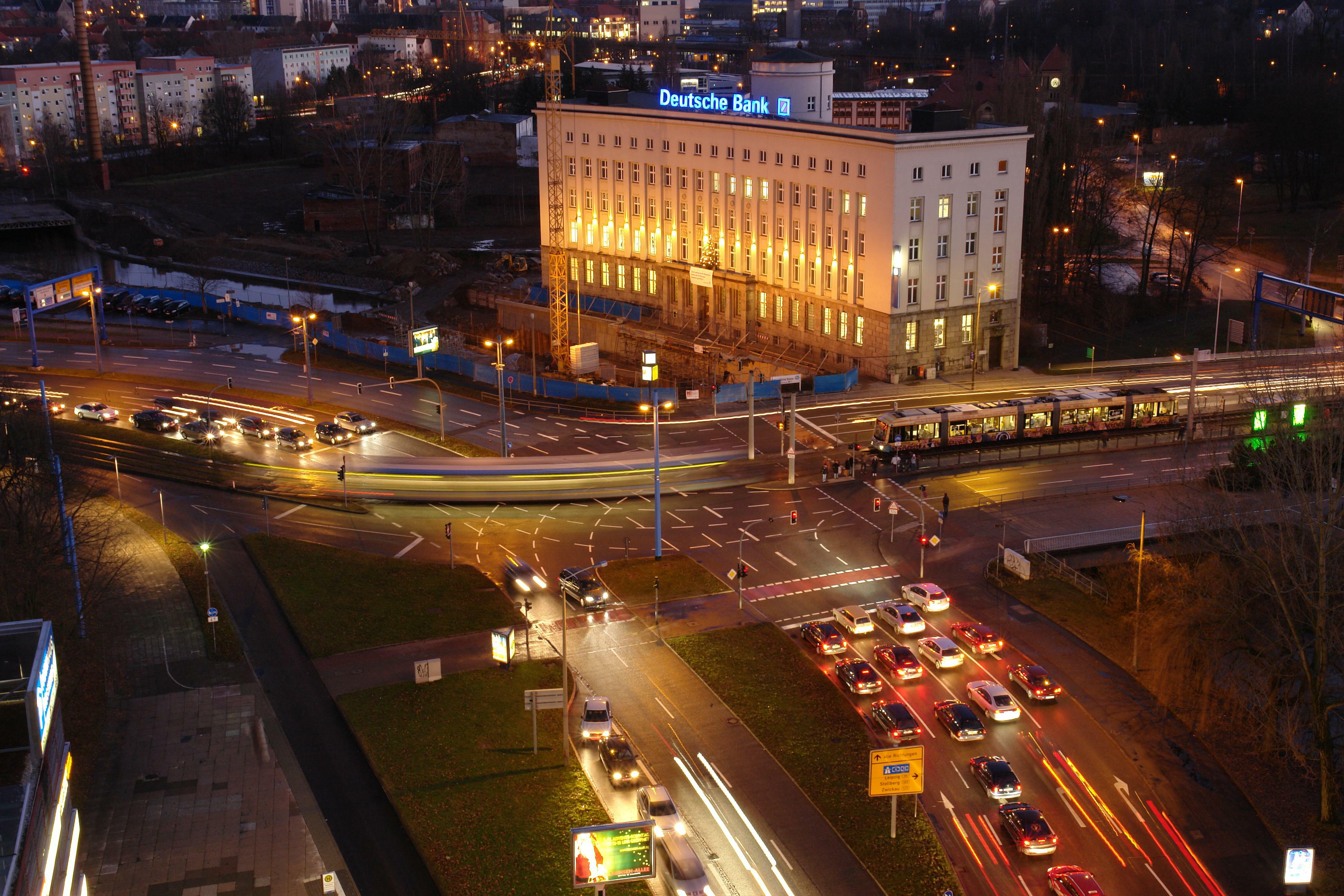
View over Falkeplatz at night

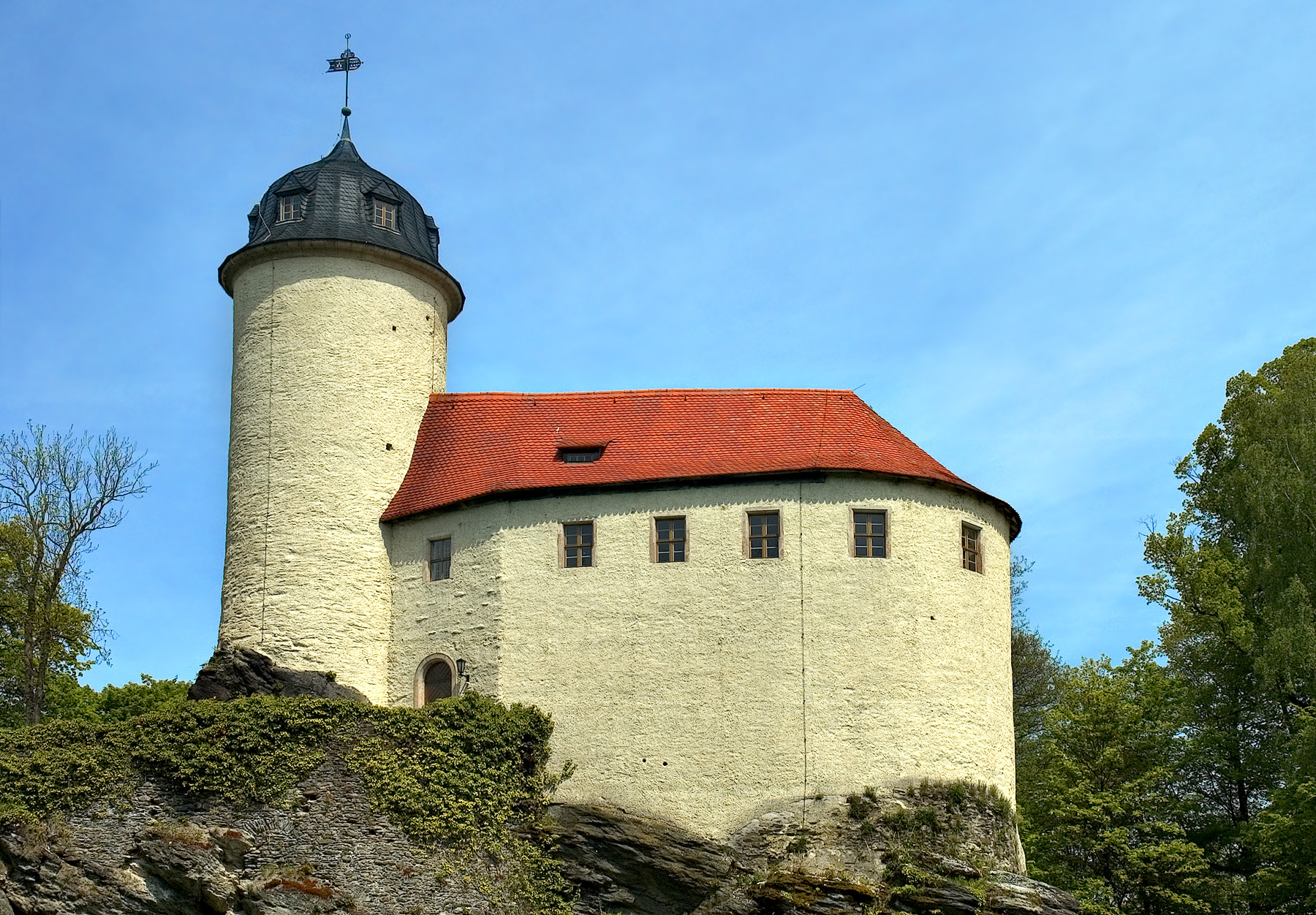
Burg Rabenstein

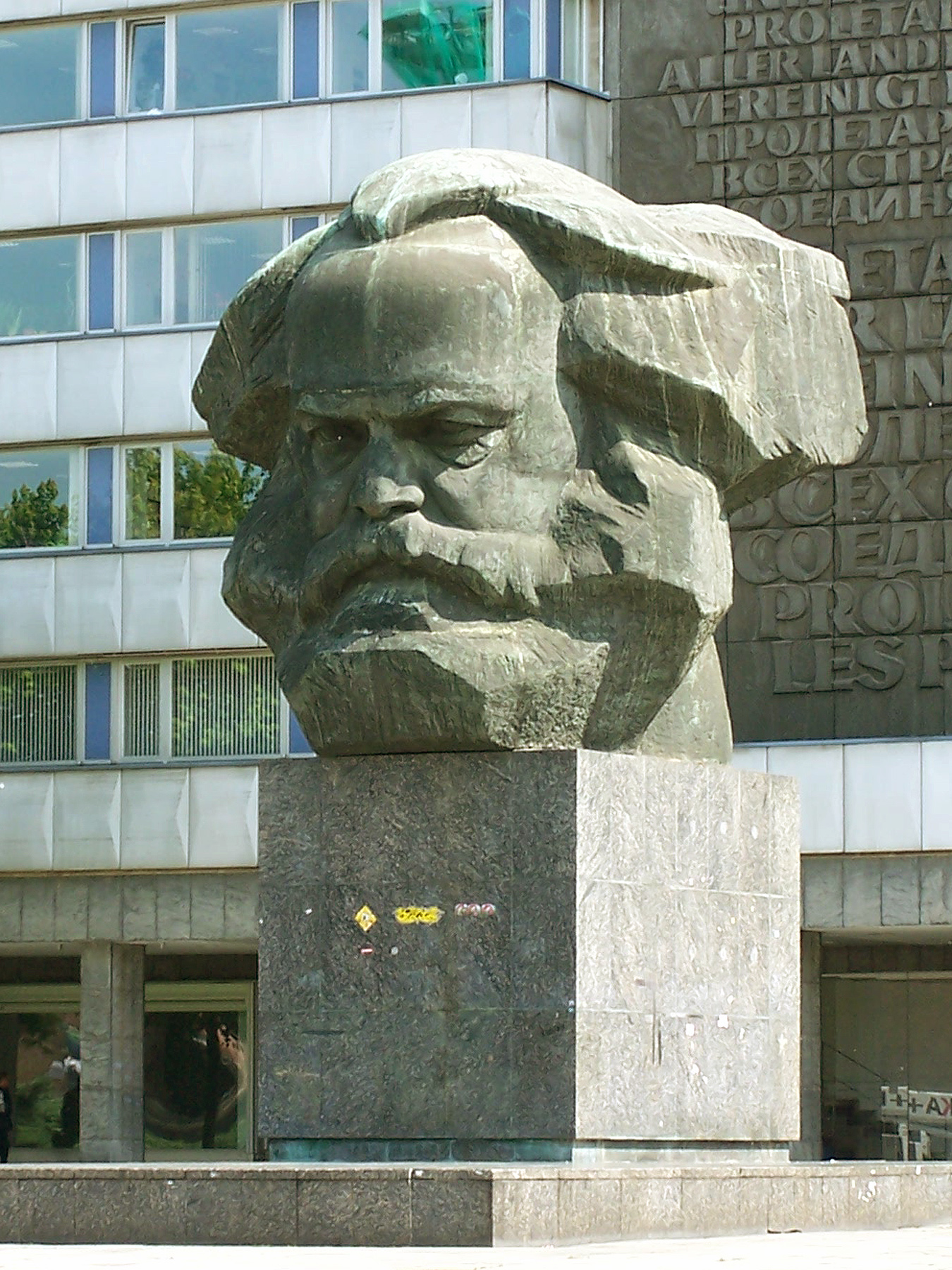
Bust of Karl Marx, the city's former namesake

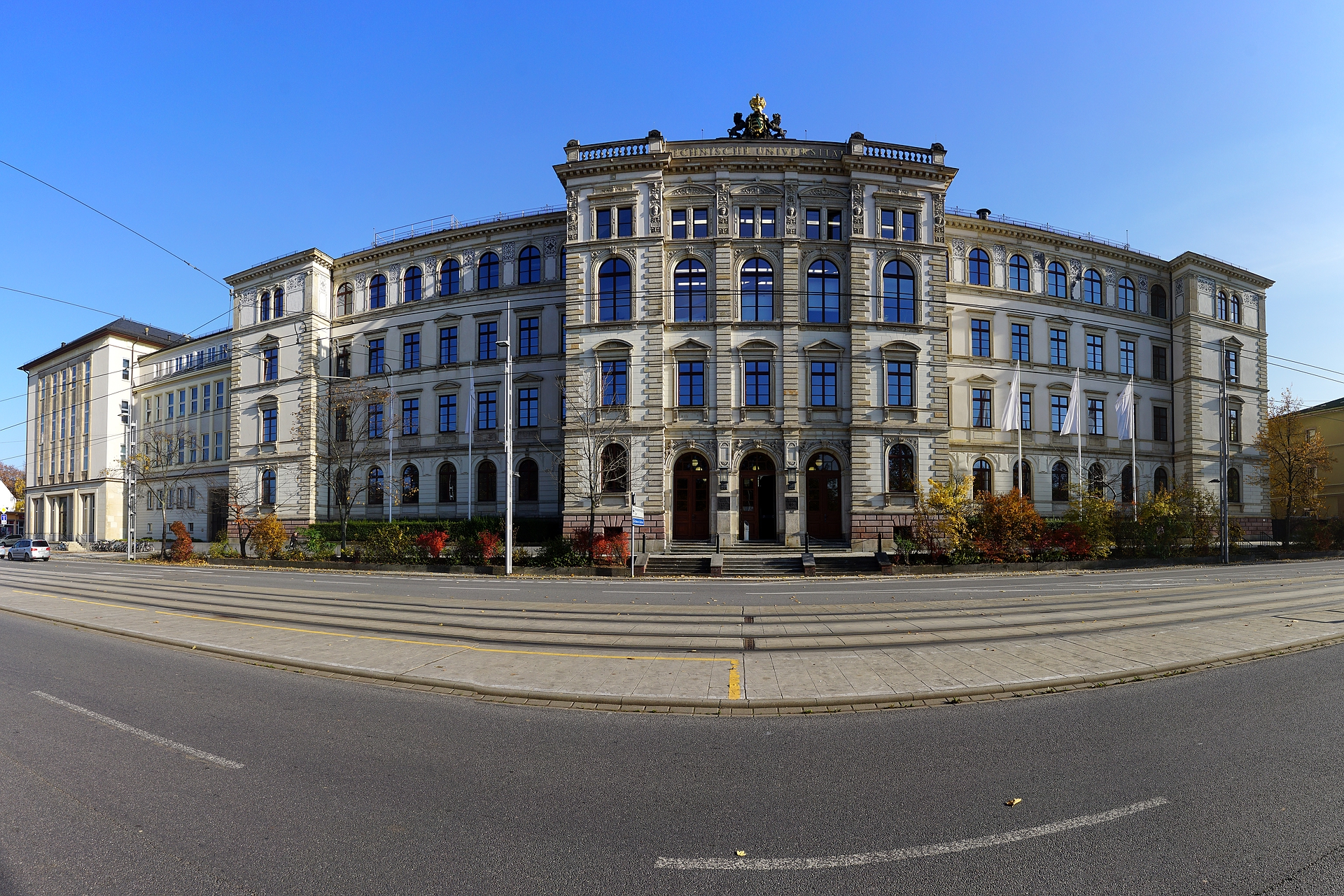
Chemnitz University of Technology

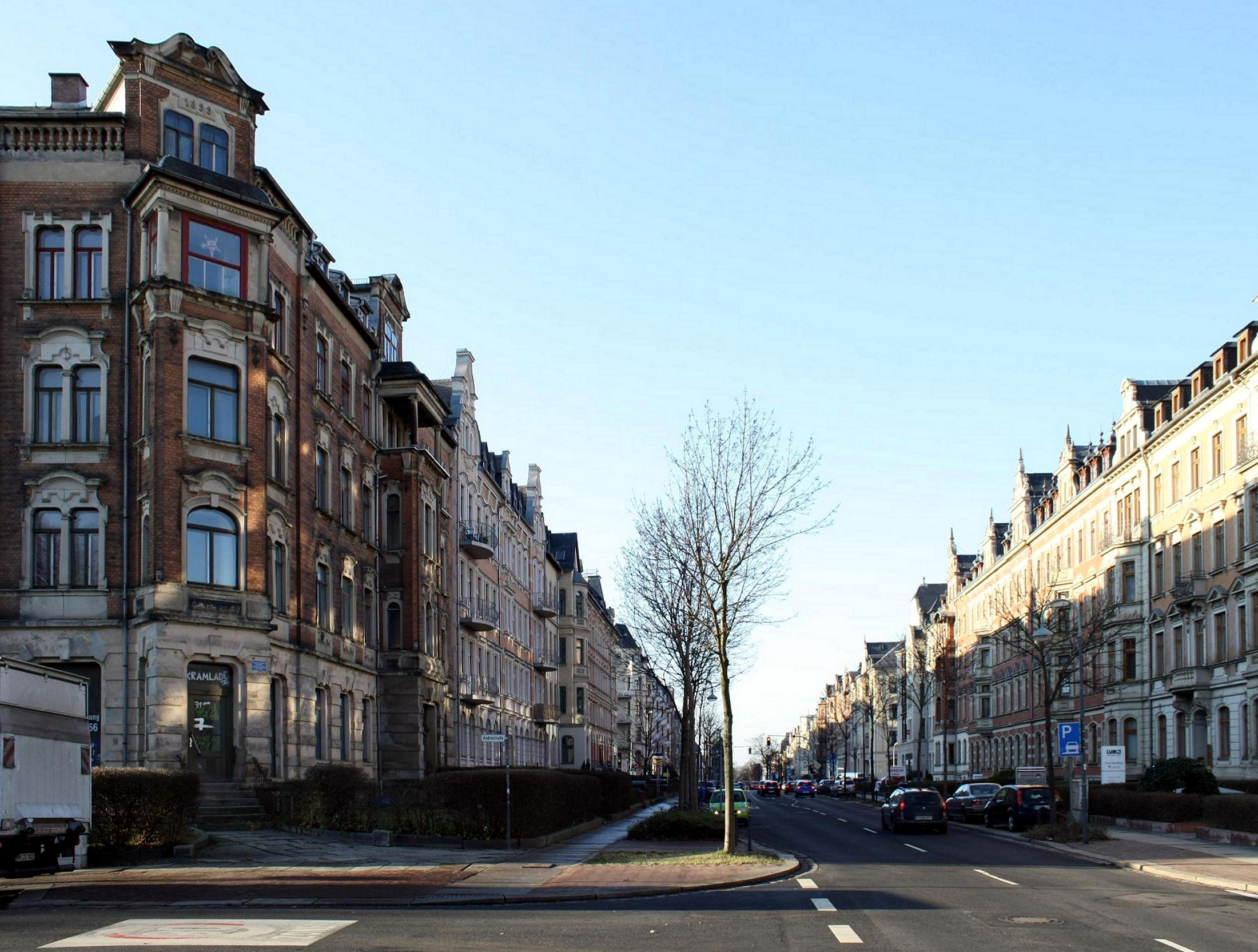
Gründerzeit quarter Kaßberg

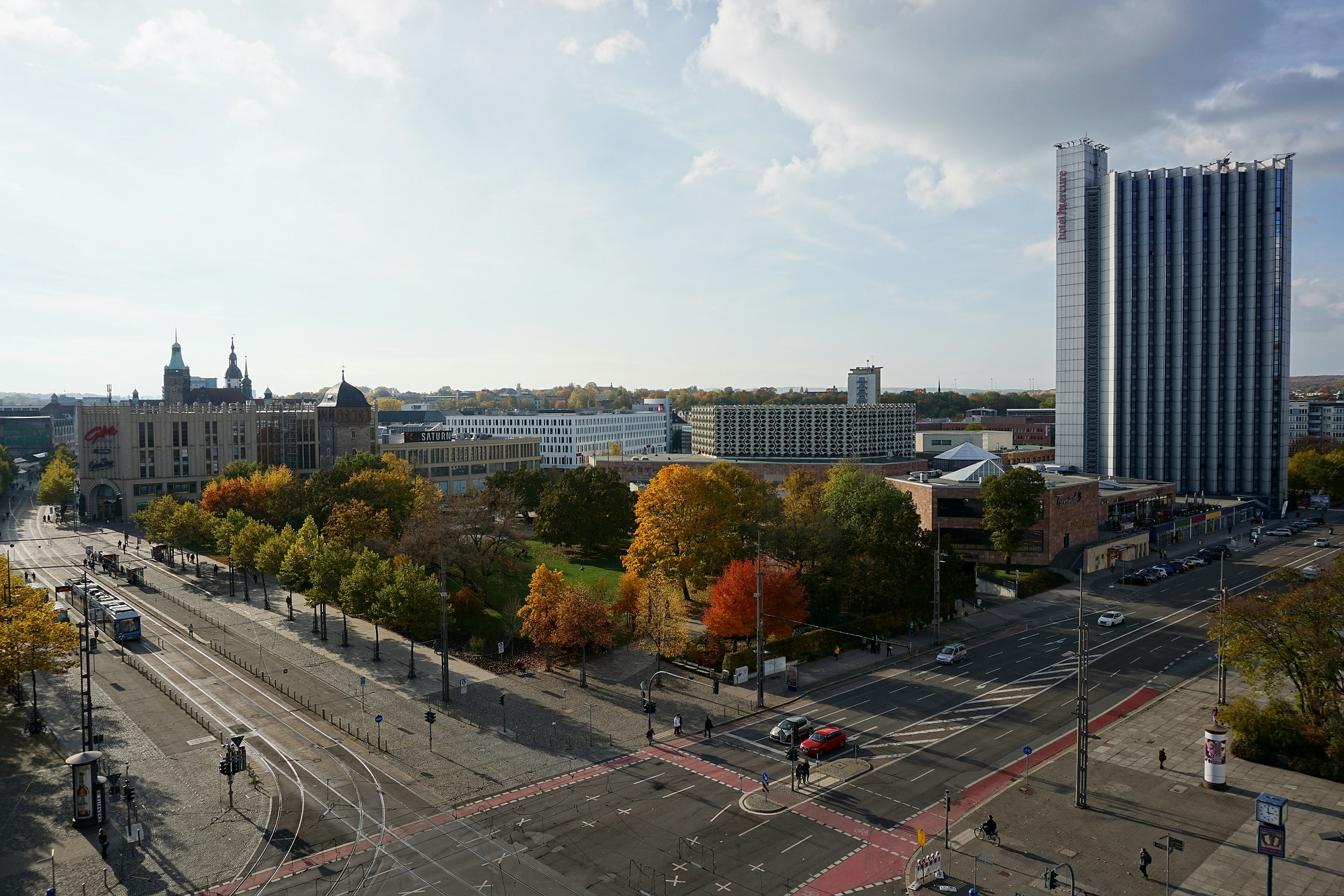
View over the city halls and the inner city

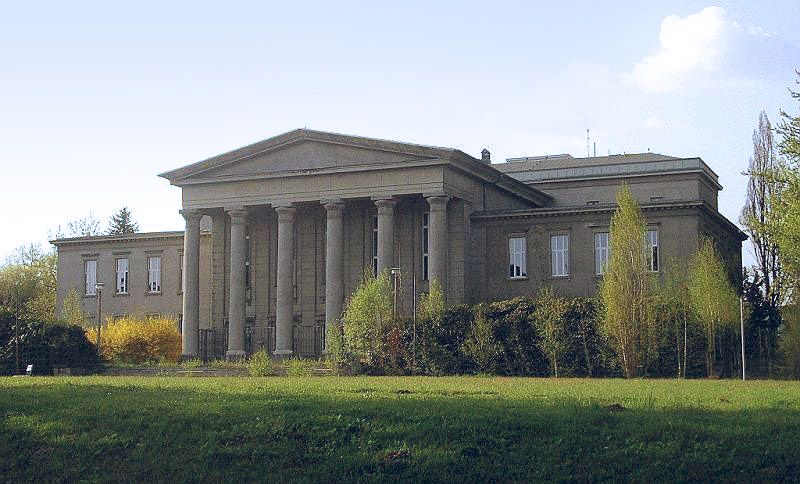
Chemnitz-Kulturhaus

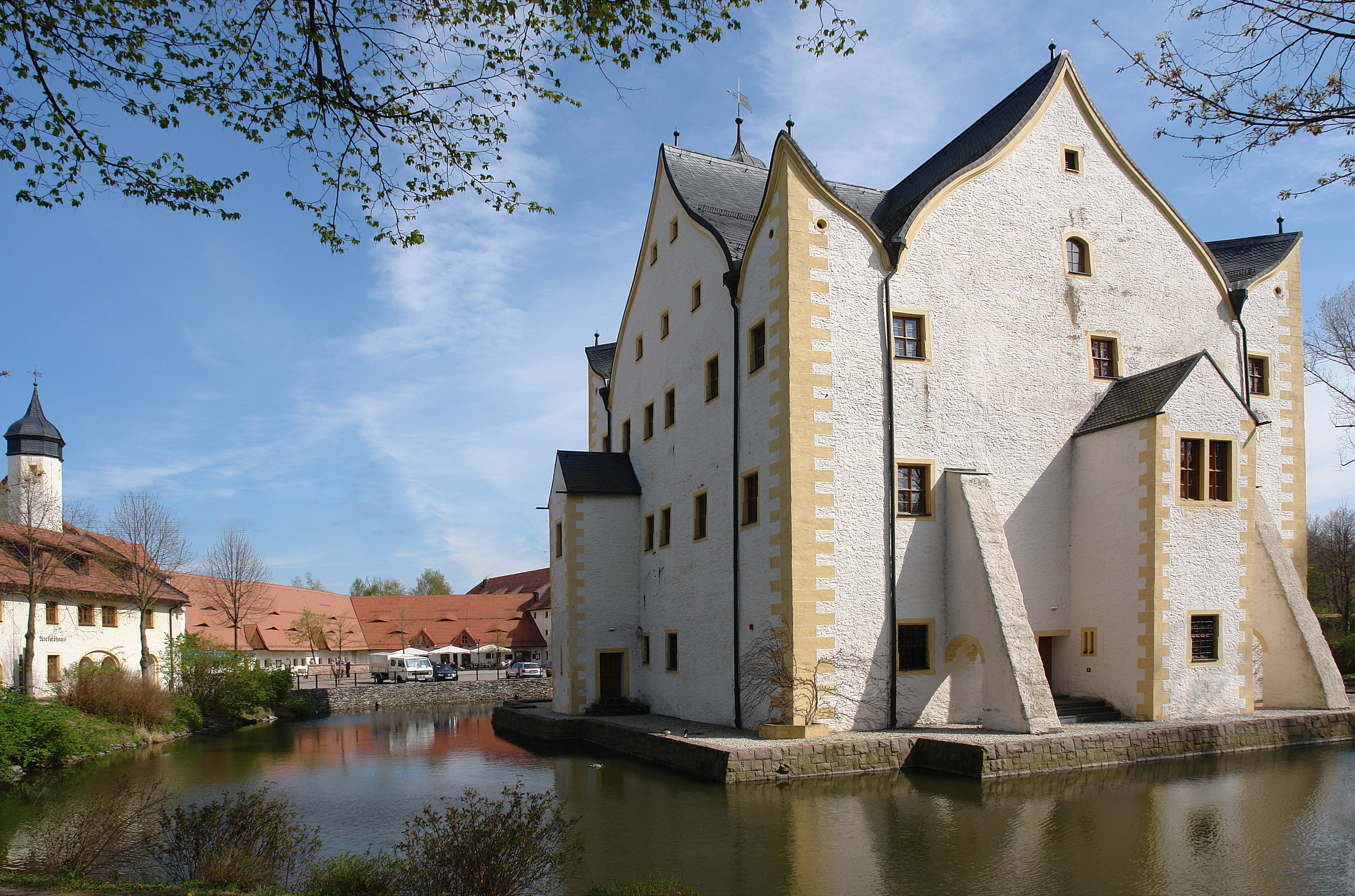
Watercastle Klaffenbach

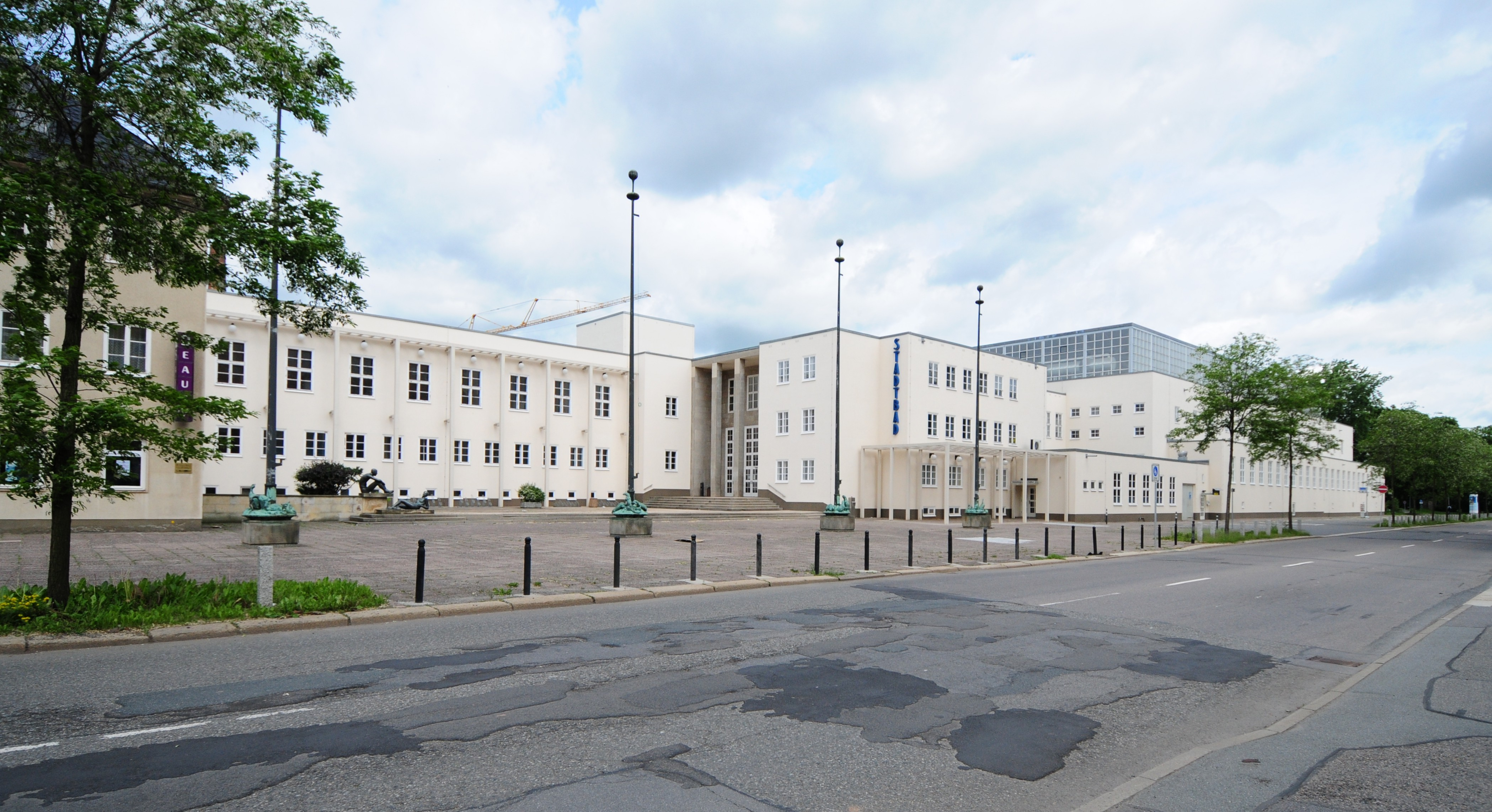
Chemnitz Stadtbad

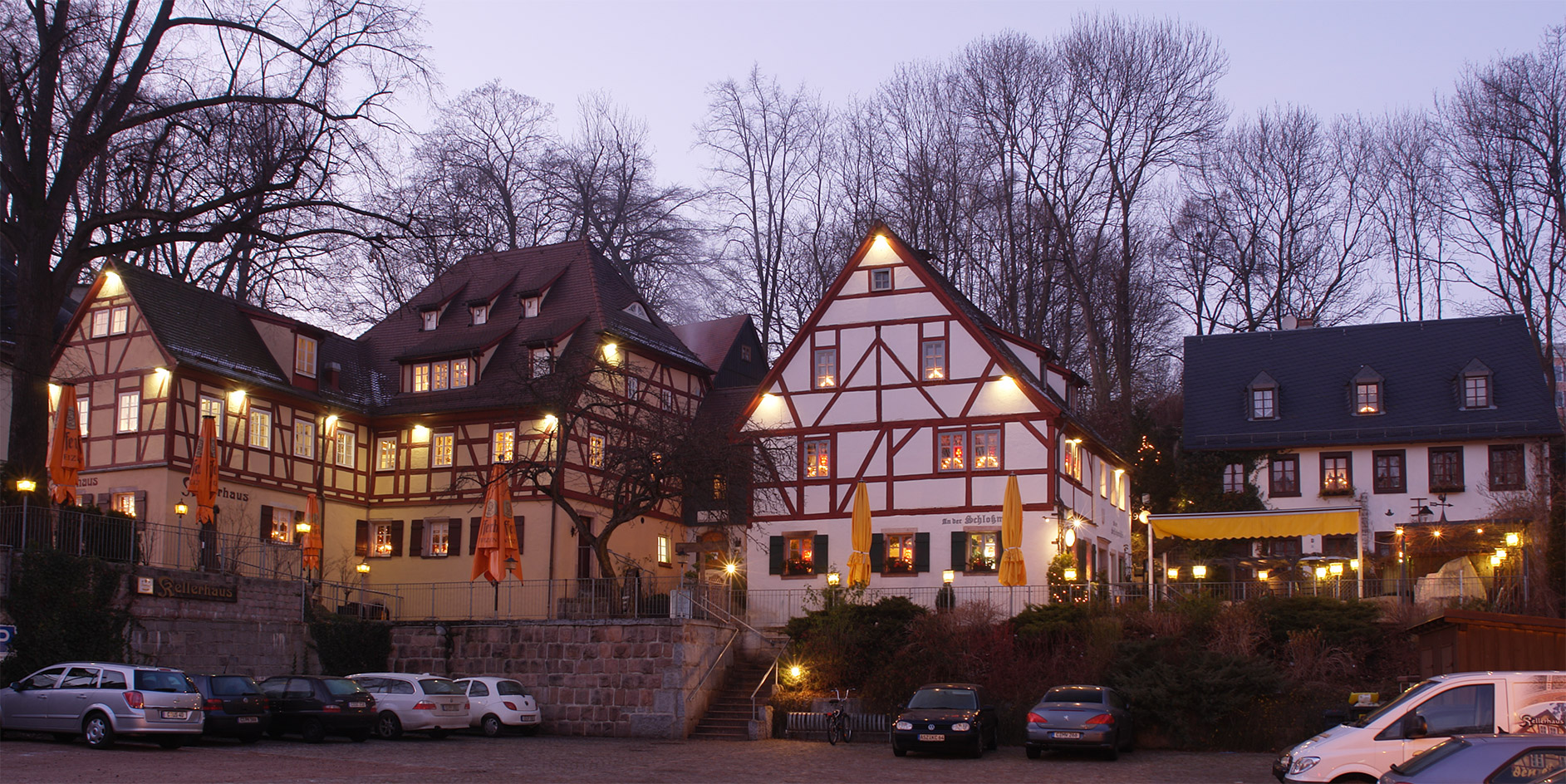
Guest houses at Castle park

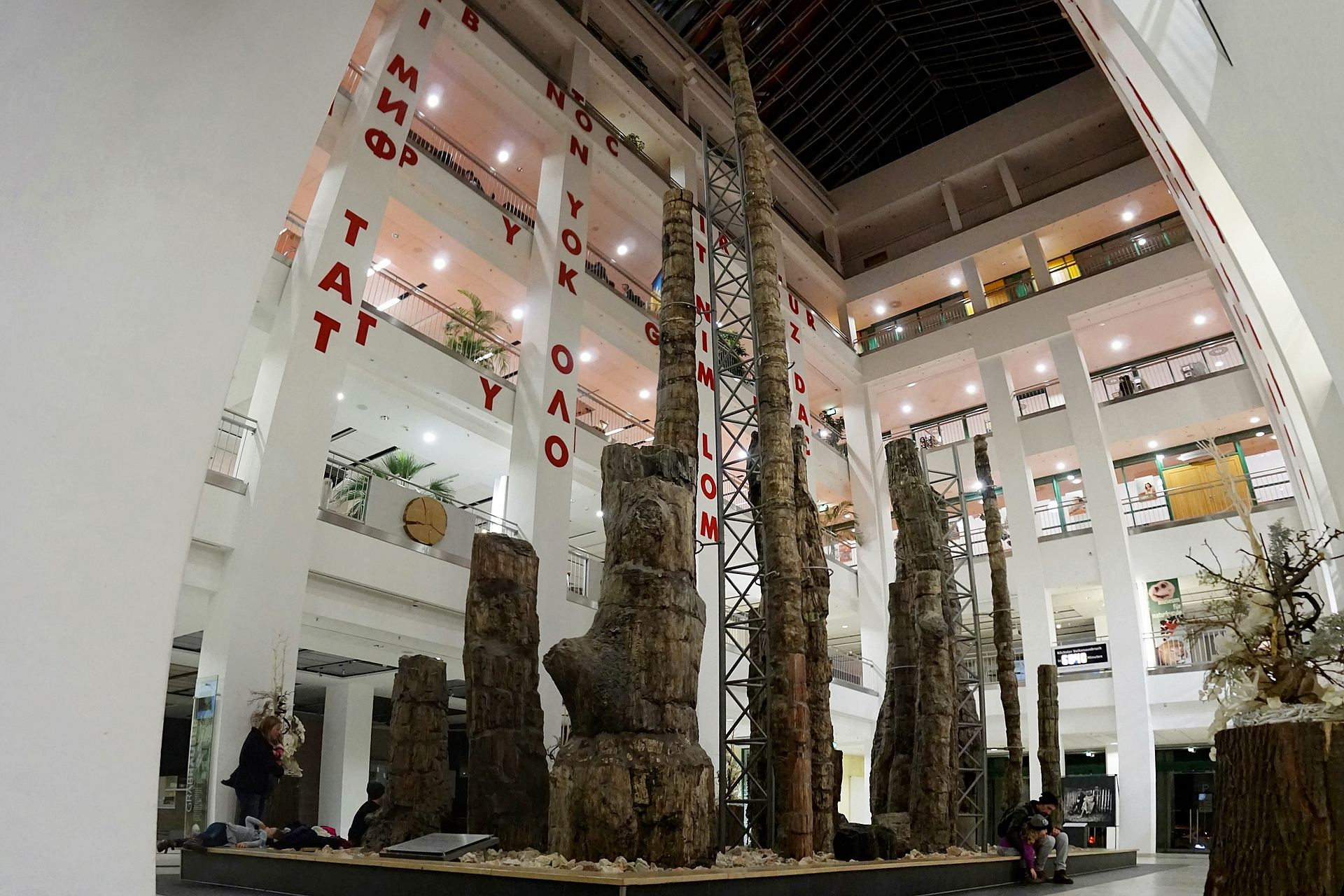
Chemnitz petrified forest inside the Kulturkaufhaus Tietz

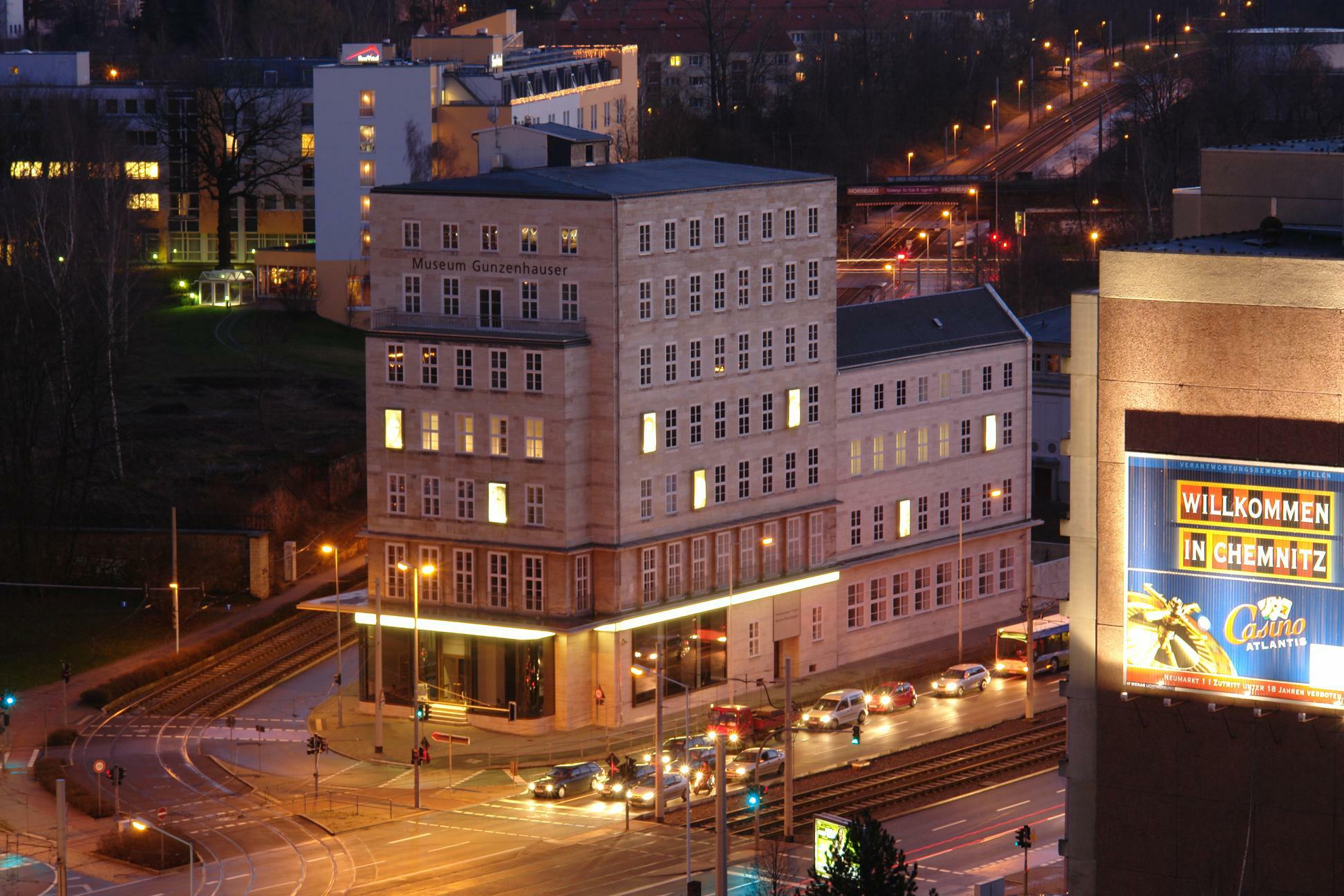
Gunzenhauser Museum

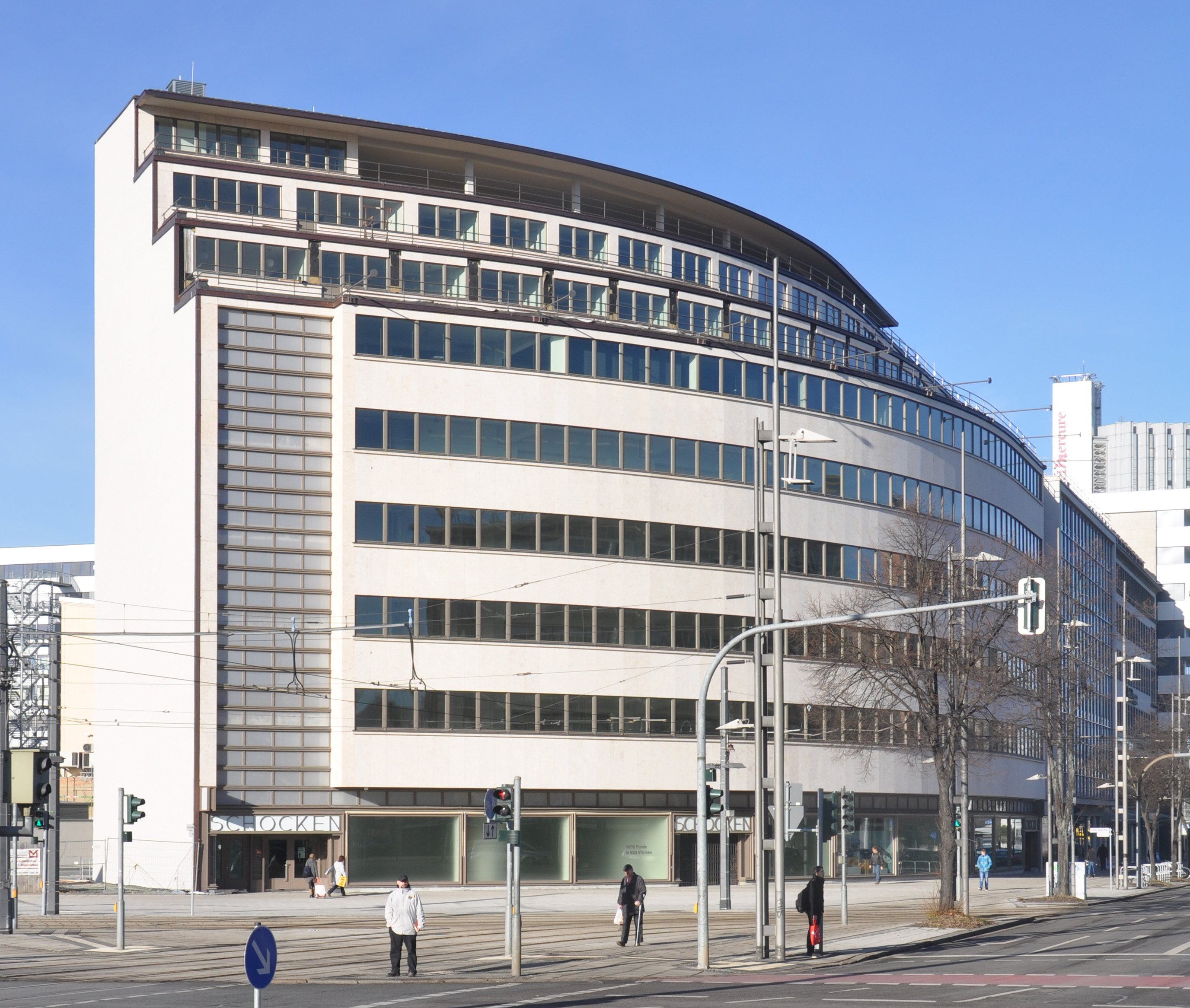
State Museum of Archaeology Chemnitz

== Climate ==
Chemnitz has an oceanic climate (Köppen: Cfb; Trewartha: Dobk). The annual precipitation is 732.7 mm (28.85 in), and the precipitation in summer is about twice that in winter.

The Chemnitz weather station has recorded the following extreme values:

- Its highest temperature was 37.8 °C (100.0 °F) on 20 August 2012.
- Its lowest temperature was −28.4 °C (−19.1 °F) on 11 February 1956.
- Its greatest annual precipitation was 1,017.7 mm (40.07 in) in 1941.
- Its least annual precipitation was 426.1 mm (16.78 in) in 1943.
- The longest annual sunshine was 2,119 hours in 2011.
- The shortest annual sunshine was 1,077.7 hours in 1977.

Climate data for Chemnitz (1991–2020 normals, extremes 1882–present)
Month	Jan	Feb	Mar	Apr	May	Jun	Jul	Aug	Sep	Oct	Nov	Dec	Year
Record high °C (°F)	16.0 (60.8)	19.5 (67.1)	24.5 (76.1)	29.5 (85.1)	32.2 (90.0)	36.2 (97.2)	36.6 (97.9)	37.8 (100.0)	34.3 (93.7)	27.7 (81.9)	21.9 (71.4)	17.8 (64.0)	37.8 (100.0)
Mean maximum °C (°F)	10.4 (50.7)	12.2 (54.0)	16.9 (62.4)	22.6 (72.7)	26.3 (79.3)	29.8 (85.6)	31.1 (88.0)	31.0 (87.8)	26.1 (79.0)	21.8 (71.2)	15.1 (59.2)	11.0 (51.8)	32.9 (91.2)
Mean daily maximum °C (°F)	2.7 (36.9)	3.7 (38.7)	7.6 (45.7)	13.1 (55.6)	17.5 (63.5)	20.8 (69.4)	23.3 (73.9)	23.2 (73.8)	18.1 (64.6)	12.9 (55.2)	7.2 (45.0)	3.7 (38.7)	12.8 (55.0)
Daily mean °C (°F)	0.2 (32.4)	0.8 (33.4)	3.9 (39.0)	8.7 (47.7)	12.9 (55.2)	16.0 (60.8)	18.2 (64.8)	18.1 (64.6)	13.8 (56.8)	9.2 (48.6)	4.4 (39.9)	1.2 (34.2)	8.9 (48.0)
Mean daily minimum °C (°F)	−2.3 (27.9)	−2.0 (28.4)	0.7 (33.3)	4.4 (39.9)	8.2 (46.8)	11.4 (52.5)	13.4 (56.1)	13.6 (56.5)	9.9 (49.8)	6.1 (43.0)	1.9 (35.4)	−1.1 (30.0)	5.3 (41.5)
Mean minimum °C (°F)	−12.2 (10.0)	−9.8 (14.4)	−5.3 (22.5)	−2.3 (27.9)	2.3 (36.1)	6.1 (43.0)	8.6 (47.5)	8.3 (46.9)	4.6 (40.3)	−0.3 (31.5)	−4.5 (23.9)	−9.0 (15.8)	−14.1 (6.6)
Record low °C (°F)	−28.3 (−18.9)	−28.4 (−19.1)	−23.1 (−9.6)	−10.6 (12.9)	−4.0 (24.8)	0.5 (32.9)	4.1 (39.4)	3.3 (37.9)	−2.3 (27.9)	−8.7 (16.3)	−17.5 (0.5)	−25.6 (−14.1)	−28.4 (−19.1)
Average precipitation mm (inches)	48.1 (1.89)	38.9 (1.53)	51.5 (2.03)	40.7 (1.60)	66.0 (2.60)	72.8 (2.87)	95.4 (3.76)	89.9 (3.54)	63.4 (2.50)	57.8 (2.28)	55.1 (2.17)	53.2 (2.09)	732.7 (28.85)
Average extreme snow depth cm (inches)	16.3 (6.4)	16.1 (6.3)	9.1 (3.6)	1.9 (0.7)	0 (0)	0 (0)	0 (0)	0 (0)	0 (0)	0.7 (0.3)	5.5 (2.2)	11.8 (4.6)	26.0 (10.2)
Average precipitation days (≥ 0.1 mm)	16.6	15.0	16.6	12.5	14.4	14.2	15.1	13.7	12.8	14.3	15.2	17.6	178.1
Average snowy days (≥ 1.0 cm)	15.1	14.3	7.8	1.3	0	0	0	0	0	0.3	4.3	10.6	56.8
Average relative humidity (%)	83.5	80.5	77.2	69.3	70.6	72.2	69.8	69.0	76.1	80.3	84.4	84.5	76.7
Mean monthly sunshine hours	66.1	84.7	124.2	180.9	211.3	212.1	227.0	214.5	158.7	121.2	69.4	59.8	1,729.8
Source 1: NOAA
Source 2: Deutscher Wetterdienst / SKlima.de

== Administrative divisions ==
The city of Chemnitz consists of 39 neighbourhoods. The neighbourhoods of Einsiedel, Euba, Grüna, Klaffenbach, Kleinolbersdorf-Altenhain, Mittelbach, Röhrsdorf and Wittgensdorf are simultaneously localities within the meaning of Sections 65 to 68 of the Saxon Municipal Code. These neighbourhoods joined the city of Chemnitz as formerly independent municipalities following the last wave of incorporations after 1990, and therefore enjoy a special status compared to the other parts of the city. Each of these localities has a local council which, depending on the population of the locality in question, comprises between ten and sixteen members, as well as a chairman. The local councils must be consulted on important matters affecting their locality; however, the final decision rests with the city council of Chemnitz.

The official numbering of the districts follows this principle: starting from the city centre (the neighbourhoods of Zentrum and Schloßchemnitz), all other parts of the city are assigned in clockwise order, with the tens digit of their index increasing clockwise and the units digit increasing in the direction of the city periphery.

Neighborhoods by number code
- Adelsberg (25)
- Altchemnitz (41)
- Altendorf (92)
- Bernsdorf (42)
- Borna-Heinersdorf (13)
- Ebersdorf (14)
- Einsiedel ¹ (46)
- Erfenschlag (44)
- Euba ¹ (16)
- Furth (11)
- Gablenz (24)
- Glösa-Draisdorf (12)
- Grüna ¹ (95)
- Harthau (45)
- Helbersdorf (61)
- Hilbersdorf (15)
- Hutholz (64)
- Kapellenberg (81)
- Kappel (82)
- Kaßberg (91)
- Klaffenbach ¹ (47)
- Kleinolbersdorf-Altenhain ¹ (26)
- Lutherviertel (22)
- Markersdorf (62)
- Mittelbach ¹ (87)
- Morgenleite (63)
- Rabenstein (94)
- Reichenbrand (86)
- Reichenhain (43)
- Röhrsdorf ¹ (96)
- Rottluff (93)
- Schloßchemnitz (02)
- Schönau (83)
- Siegmar (85)
- Sonnenberg (21)
- Stelzendorf (84)
- Wittgensdorf ¹ (97)
- Yorckgebiet (23)
- Zentrum (01)

¹ also a locality

== Politics ==
=== Mayor ===
The first freely elected mayor after German reunification was Dieter Noll of the Christian Democratic Union (CDU), who served from 1990 to 1991, followed by Joachim Pilz (CDU) until 1993. The mayor was originally chosen by the city council, but since 1994 has been directly elected. Peter Seifert of the Social Democratic Party (SPD) served from 1993 until 2006. Between 2006 and 2020 Barbara Ludwig (SPD) has served as mayor. Sven Schulze (SPD) was elected mayor in 2020.

The most recent mayoral election was held on 20 September 2020, with a runoff held on 11 October, and the results were as follows:

Candidate	Party	First round		Second round	
Candidate	Party	Votes	%	Votes	%
Sven Schulze	Social Democratic Party	22,241	23.1	31,749	34.9
Almut Patt	Christian Democratic Union	20,630	21.4	20,047	22.0
Susanne Schaper	The Left	14,584	15.1	14,668	16.1
Ulrich Oehme	Alternative for Germany	11,731	12.2	12,034	13.2
Lars Faßmann	Independent	11,470	11.9	12,515	13.8
Volkmar Zschocke	Alliance 90/The Greens	6,811	7.1	Withdrew	
Matthias Eberlein	Free Voters	3,394	3.5	Withdrew	
Paul Vogel	Die PARTEI	1,527	1.6	Withdrew	
Valid votes		96,428	99.5	91,017	99.7
Invalid votes		489	0.5	285	0.3
Total		96,917	100.0	91,302	100.0
Electorate/voter turnout		194,952	49.7	194,850	46.9
Source: Wahlen in Sachsen

=== City council ===
The most recent city council election was held on 9 June 2024, and the results were as follows:

Party	Votes	%	+/-	Seats	+/-
Alternative for Germany (AfD)	86,198	24.3	▲6.4	15	▲4
Christian Democratic Union (CDU)	75,727	21.3	▼1.3	13	0
Sahra Wagenknecht Alliance (BSW)	53,441	15.0	New	8	New
Social Democratic Party (SPD)	43,922	12.4	▲0.8	7	0
The Left (Die Linke)	26,984	7.6	▼9.1	5	▼5
Alliance 90/The Greens (Grüne)	25,833	7.3	▼4.2	4	▼3
Pro Chemnitz/Free Saxons (Pro C/FS)	17,557	4.9	▼2.8	3	▼2
Free Democratic Party (FDP)	12,759	3.6	▼3.8	2	▼2
Citizen Alliance Solidarity (BBS)	2,656	0.7	New	0	New
Valid votes	121,838	98.5			
Invalid votes	1,804	1.5			
Total	123,642	100.0		59	▼1
Electorate/voter turnout	189,189	65.4	▲4.1		
Source: Wahlen in Sachsen

== Economy ==
Chemnitz is the largest city of the Chemnitz-Zwickau urban area and one of the most important economic areas in the new states of Germany. Chemnitz had a GDP of €8.456 billion in 2016, with GDP per capita at €34,166. Since about 2000, the city's economy has recorded high annual GDP growth rates; Chemnitz is among the top ten German cities in terms of growth rate. The local and regional economic structure is characterised by medium-sized companies, with the heavy industrial sectors of mechanical engineering, metal processing, and vehicle manufacturing as the most significant industries.

About 100,000 people are employed, of whom about 46,000 commute from other municipalities. 16.3% of employees in Chemnitz have an academic degree, twice the average rate in Germany.

=== Image gallery ===
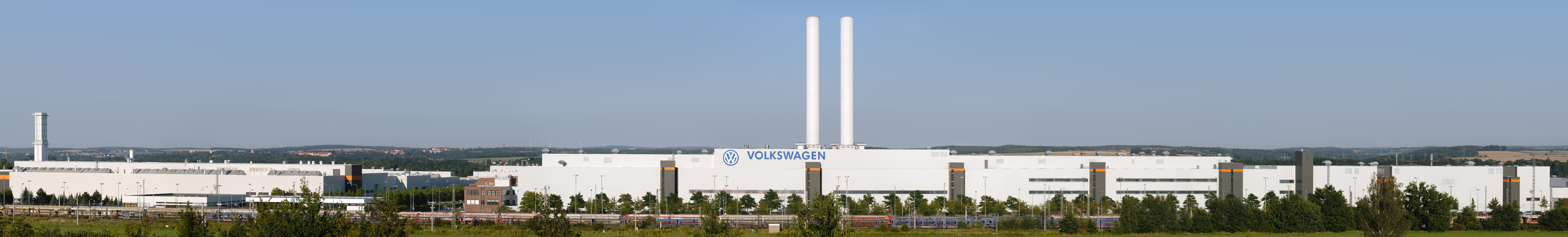
Volkswagen is the largest employer in the Chemnitz-Zwickau Agglomeration.

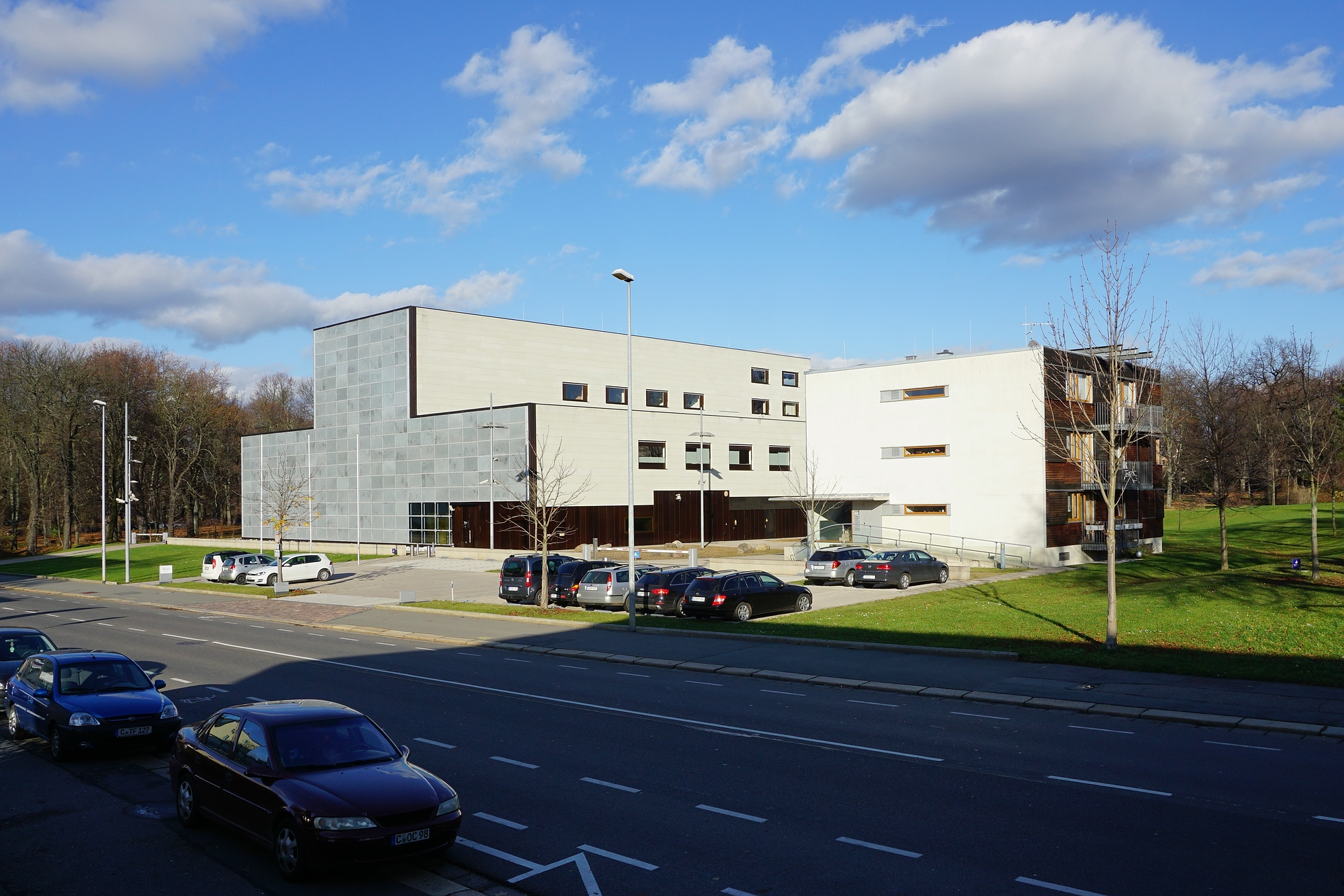
Deutsche Bundesbank Chemnitz

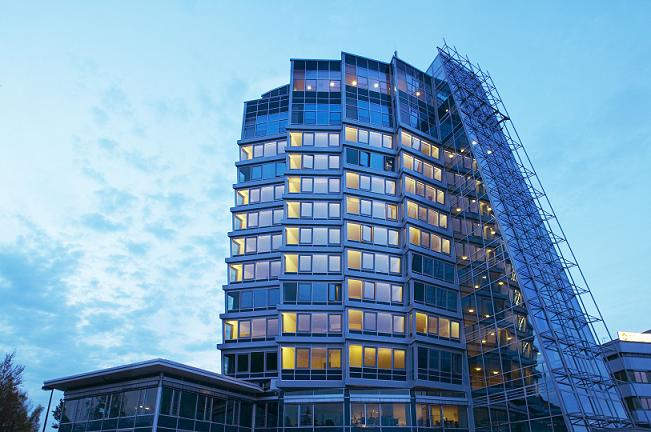
The Klinikum Chemnitz GmbH is the largest hospital in the former East German states and the second biggest employer in Chemnitz.

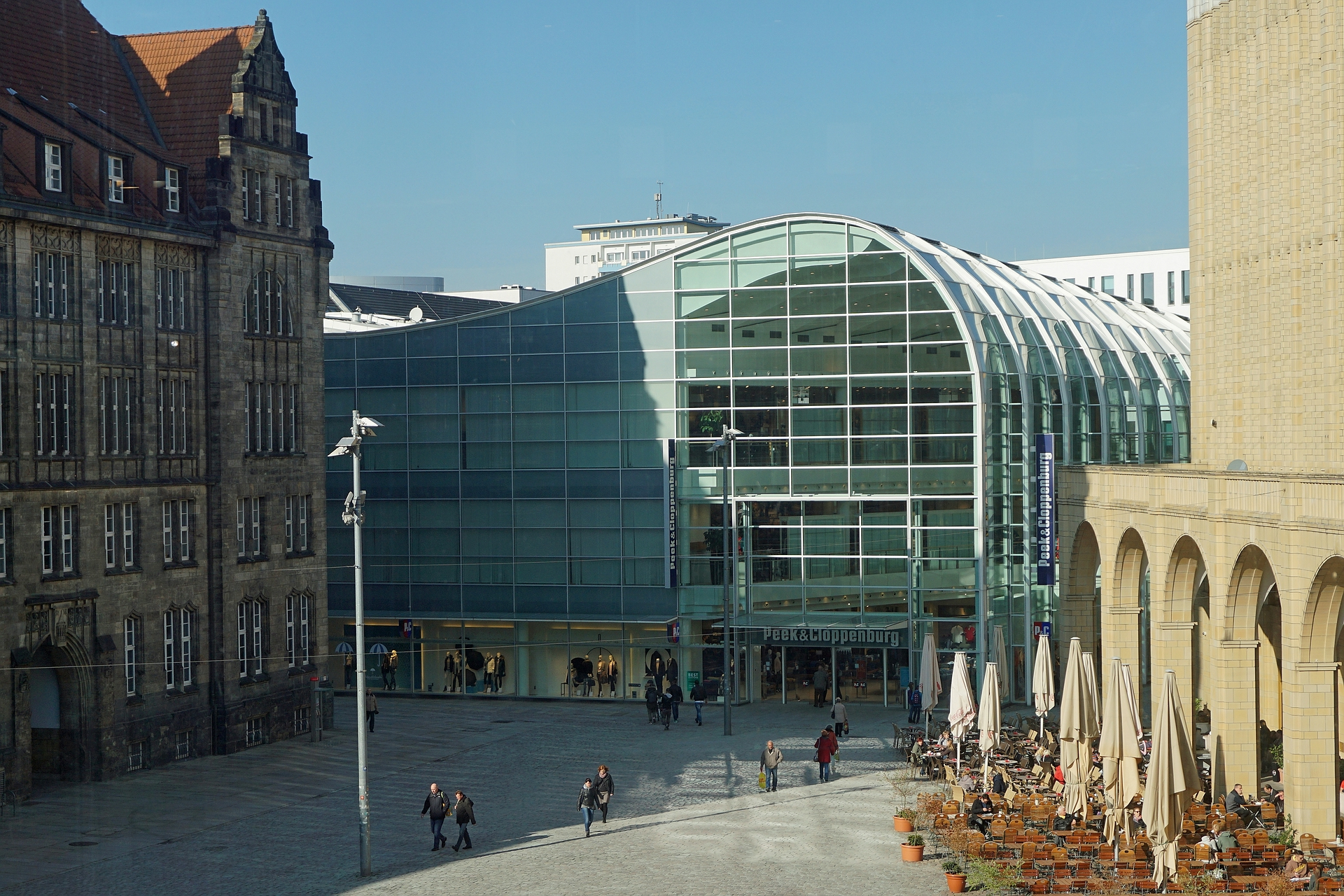
Chemnitz is a shopping destination. Photo shows the Peek & Cloppenburg store in the city centre.

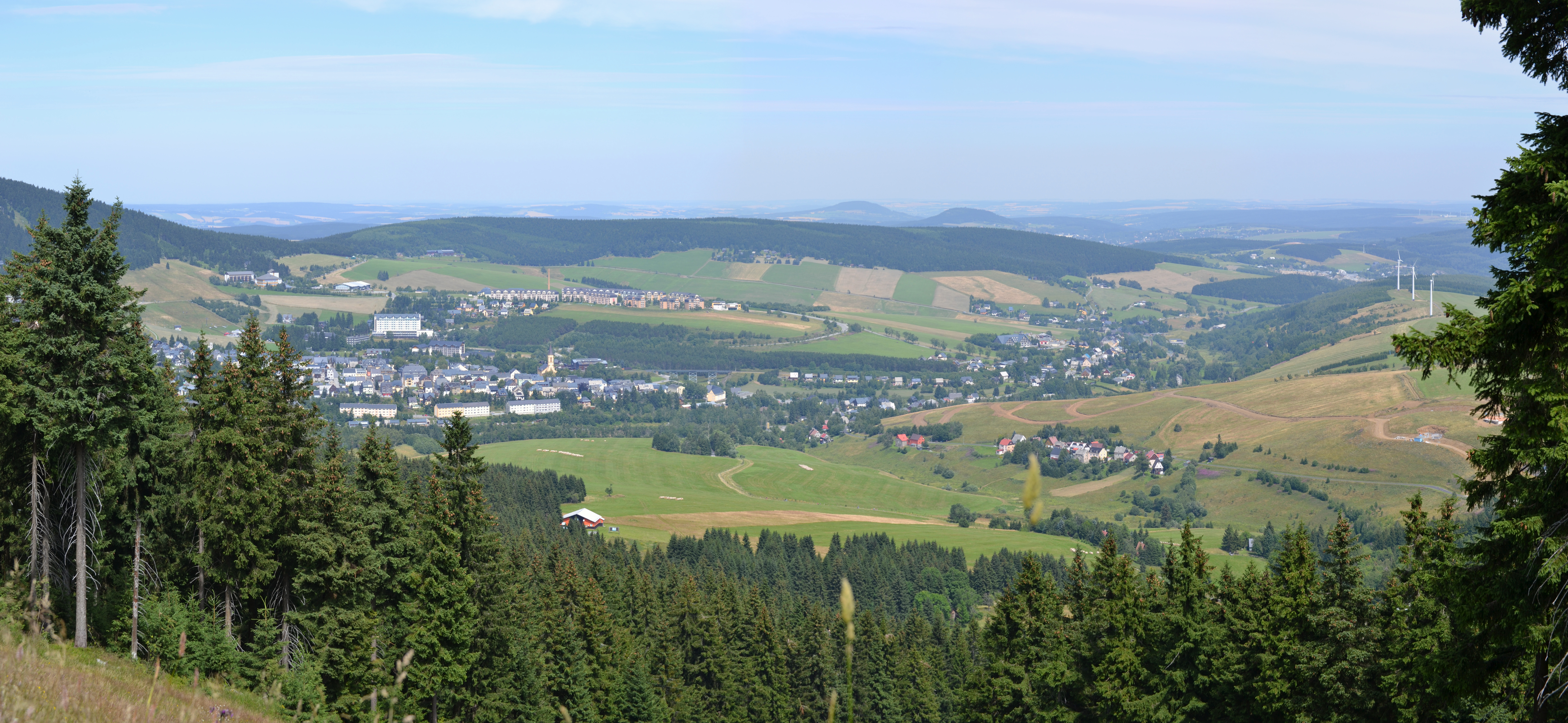
Chemnitz is the centerpiece of tourism in the Ore Mountains.

== Demographics ==
Historical population
Year	Pop.	±%
1466	3,455	—
1801	10,835	+213.6%
1852	35,163	+224.5%
1871	68,229	+94.0%
1885	110,817	+62.4%
1900	206,913	+86.7%
1910	287,807	+39.1%
1920	313,444	+8.9%
1930	361,200	+15.2%
1940	332,200	−8.0%
1950	293,373	−11.7%
1960	286,329	−2.4%
1970	299,411	+4.6%
1980	317,644	+6.1%
1990	294,244	−7.4%
2001	255,798	−13.1%
2011	240,253	−6.1%
2022	240,078	−0.1%
Population size may be affected by changes in administrative divisions. Source for 2001–2022:

Chemnitz has a population of 246,000 and is the third-largest city in Saxony. Its population grew rapidly from the early 1900s onwards as a result of industrialisation, reaching its peak of c. 362,000 in 1930. During the East German era, when the city was known as Karl-Marx-Stadt, it became a significant industrial centre noted for its textile and leather industries. At that time, Chemnitz was also the fourth-largest city in East Germany, after East Berlin, Leipzig and Dresden. Following German Reunification, the city experienced a marked population decline, losing around 20 per cent of its inhabitants since 1988. Numbers fell from 300,000 in 1989 to under 250,000 in 2003, making Chemnitz one of the cities with the greatest population loss in Germany. Growth resumed in the 2010s, driven largely by immigration. In 2015, the city recorded a fertility rate of 1.64.

=== Foreign population ===
Foreign population in Chemnitz by nationality as of 31 December 2022:

Rank	Nationality	Population (31.12.2022)
1	Ukraine	3,465
2	Syria	2,915
3	Poland	2,340
4	Afghanistan	1,460
5	Czech Republic	1,384
6	Romania	1,287
7	Hungary	1,246
8	India	1,235
9	Russia	1,145
10	Serbia	1,077

A large contributor to the city's foreign population is Chemnitz University of Technology. In 2017, out of its 10,482 students, 2712 were foreign students, which equals to about 25%, making Chemnitz the most internationalised of the three major universities of Saxony.

=== Languages ===
- Standard German
- Chemnitz dialect, which is a variety of Upper Saxon German

== Transport ==
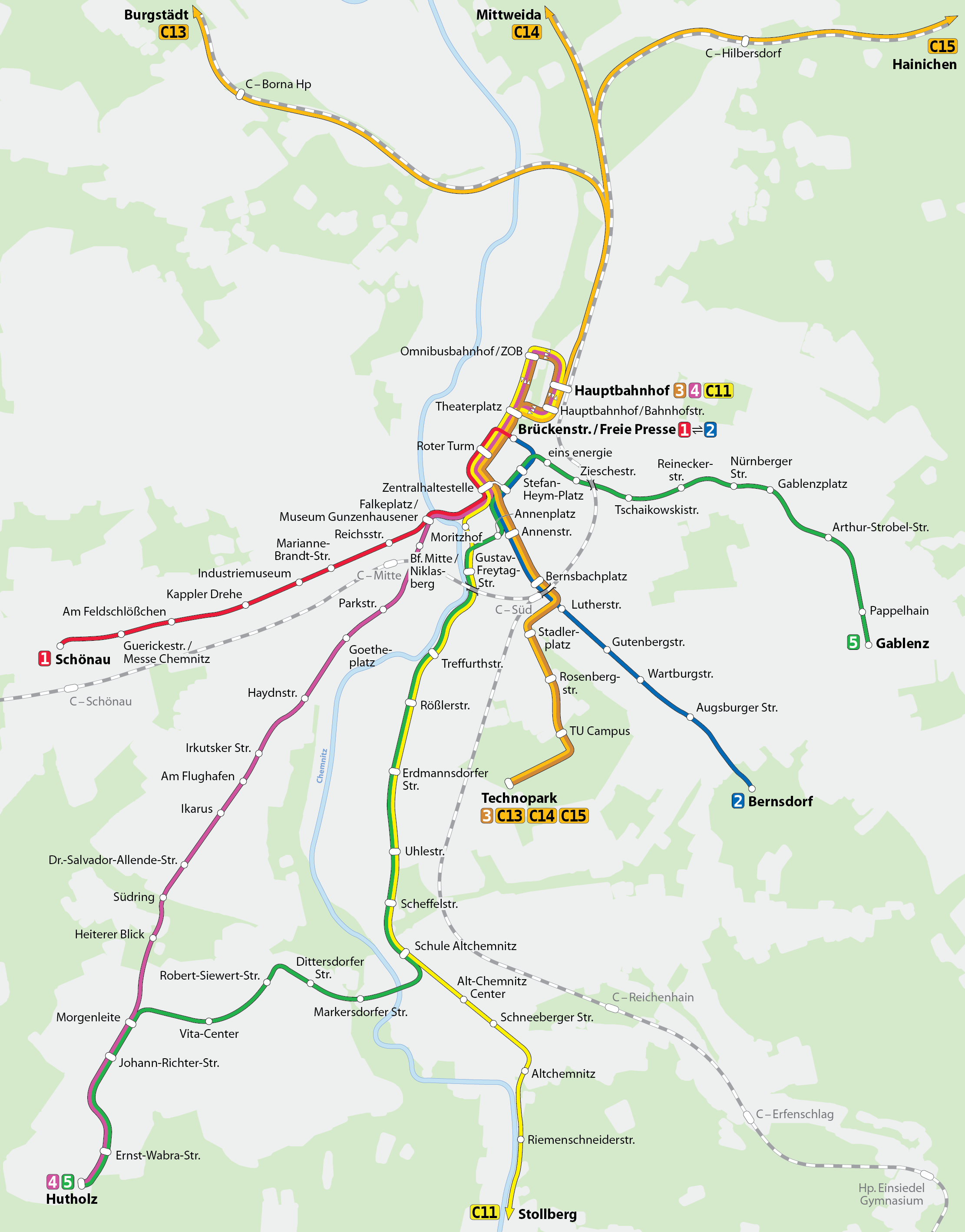
Map of the tram and Stadtbahn network

=== Roads ===
Chemnitz is linked to two motorways (Autobahnen), A4 Erfurt – Dresden and A72 Hof – Leipzig. The motorway junction Kreuz Chemnitz is situated in the northwestern area of the city. The motorway A72 between Borna and Leipzig is still under construction. Within the administrative area of Chemnitz there are eight motorway exits (Ausfahrt). The A4 motorway is part of the European route E40, one of the longest European E roads, connecting Chemnitz with the Asian Highway system to the east and France to the west.

=== Public transport ===
Public transport within Chemnitz is provided with tram and bus, as well as by the Stadtbahn. Nowadays, the city and its surroundings are served by one Stadtbahn line, five lines of the Chemnitz tramway network, 27 city bus lines, as well as several regional bus lines. At night, the city is served by two bus lines, two tram lines, and the Stadtbahn line.

Chemnitz Hauptbahnhof is the main station for the city. In June 2022, an intercity connection from Chemnitz via Dresden and Berlin to Rostock-Warnemünde was established again for the first time since 2006. Prior to this, Chemnitz was for a long time the largest German city without a connection of long-distance intercity services. 2 RegionalExpress routes connected Chemnitz to the larger cities of Saxony (RE3 from Dresden Hbf via Chemnitz to Hof & RE6 to Leipzig Hbf). In addition, 4 RegionalBahn and 4 CityBahn routes also operate from the Hauptbahnhof.

The length of the tram, Stadtbahn and bus networks is 28.73 km (17.85 mi), 16.3 km (10.13 mi) and 326.08 km (202.62 mi) respectively. In August 2012, electro-diesel trams were ordered from Vossloh, to support an expansion of the light rail network to 226 km (140 mi), with new routes serving Burgstädt, Mittweida and Hainichen.

=== Airports ===
Three airports are near Chemnitz, including the two international airports of Saxony in Dresden and Leipzig. Both Leipzig/Halle Airport and Dresden Airport are about 70 km (43 mi) from Chemnitz and offer numerous continental as well as intercontinental flights.

Chemnitz also has a small commercial airport (Flugplatz Chemnitz-Jahnsdorf about 13.5 km (8.4 mi) south of the city. When its current upgrade is completed it will have an asphalt runway 1,400 m (4,600 ft) long and 20 m (66 ft) wide.

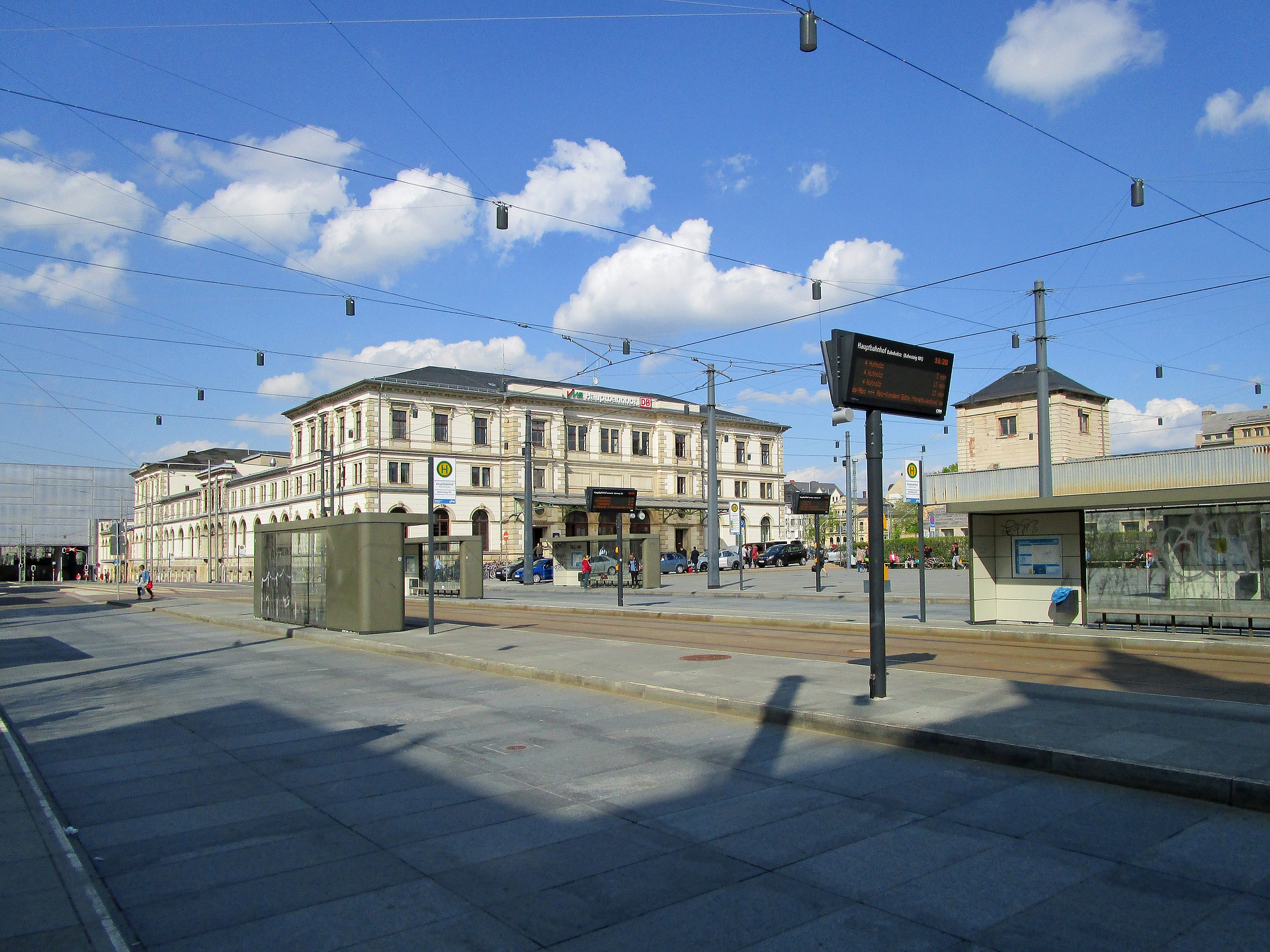
Chemnitz Hauptbahnhof, the main train station of Chemnitz

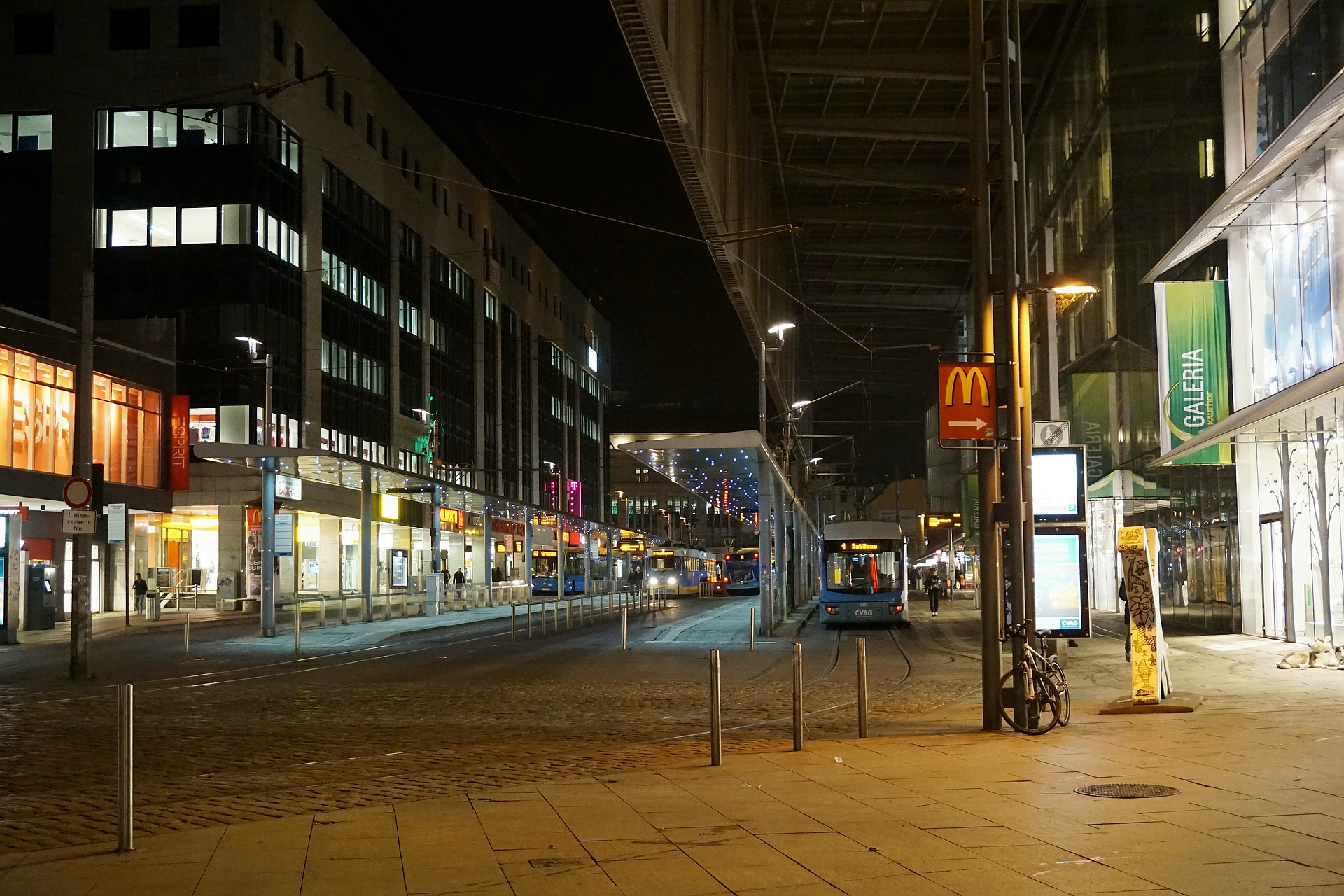
Tram stop at the main tram and bus station at night

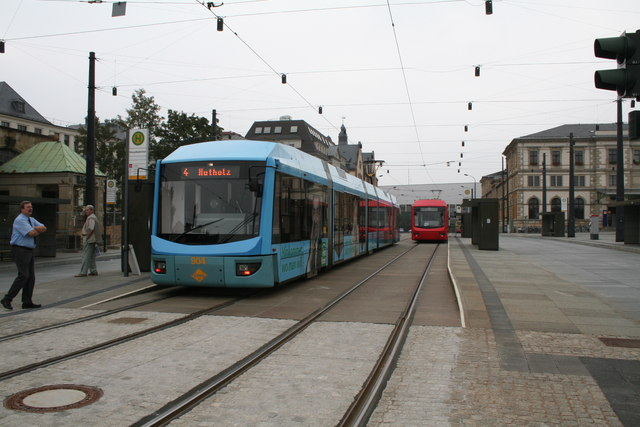
A tram in Chemnitz

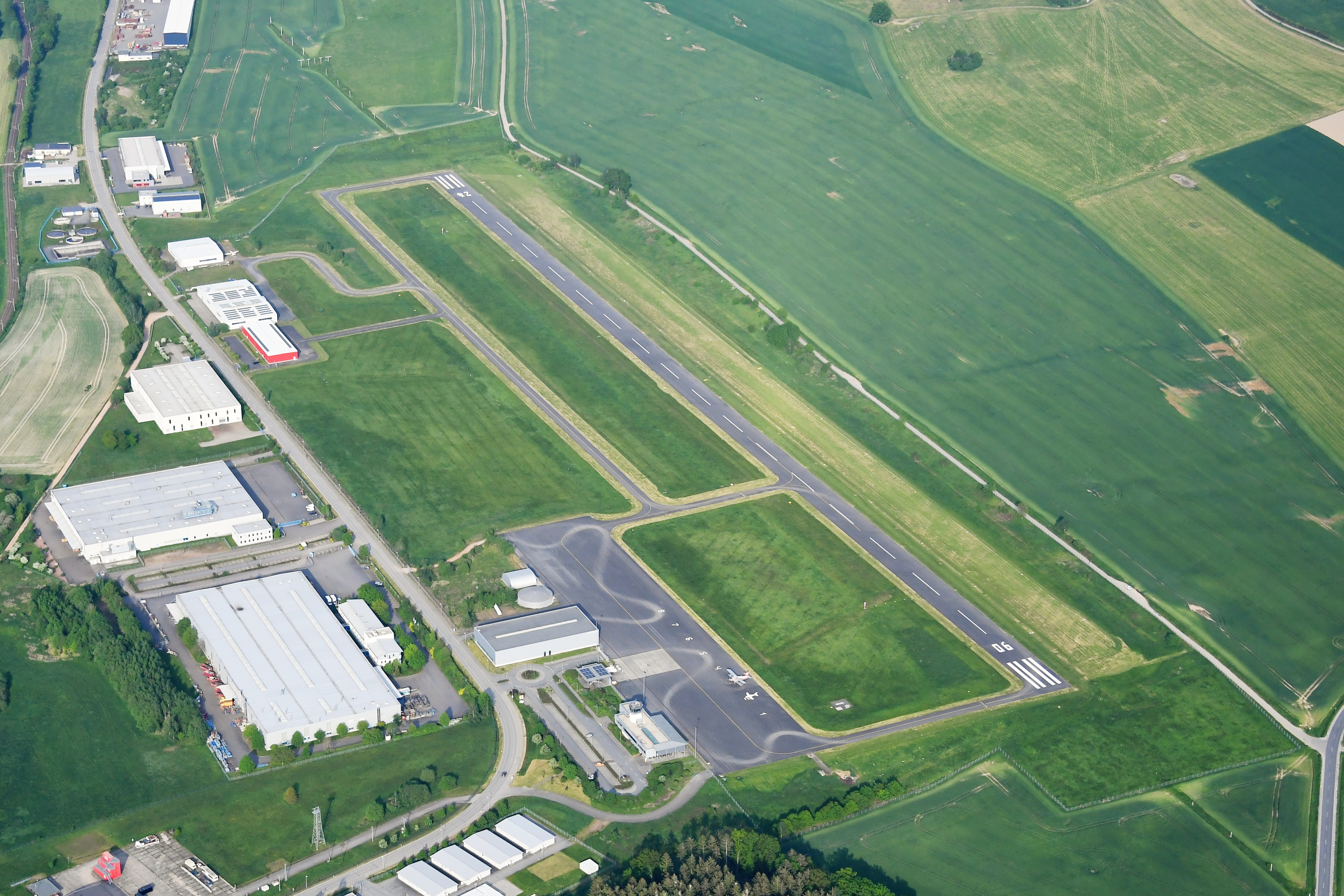
The small commercial airport Flugplatz Chemnitz-Jahnsdorf

== Sports ==
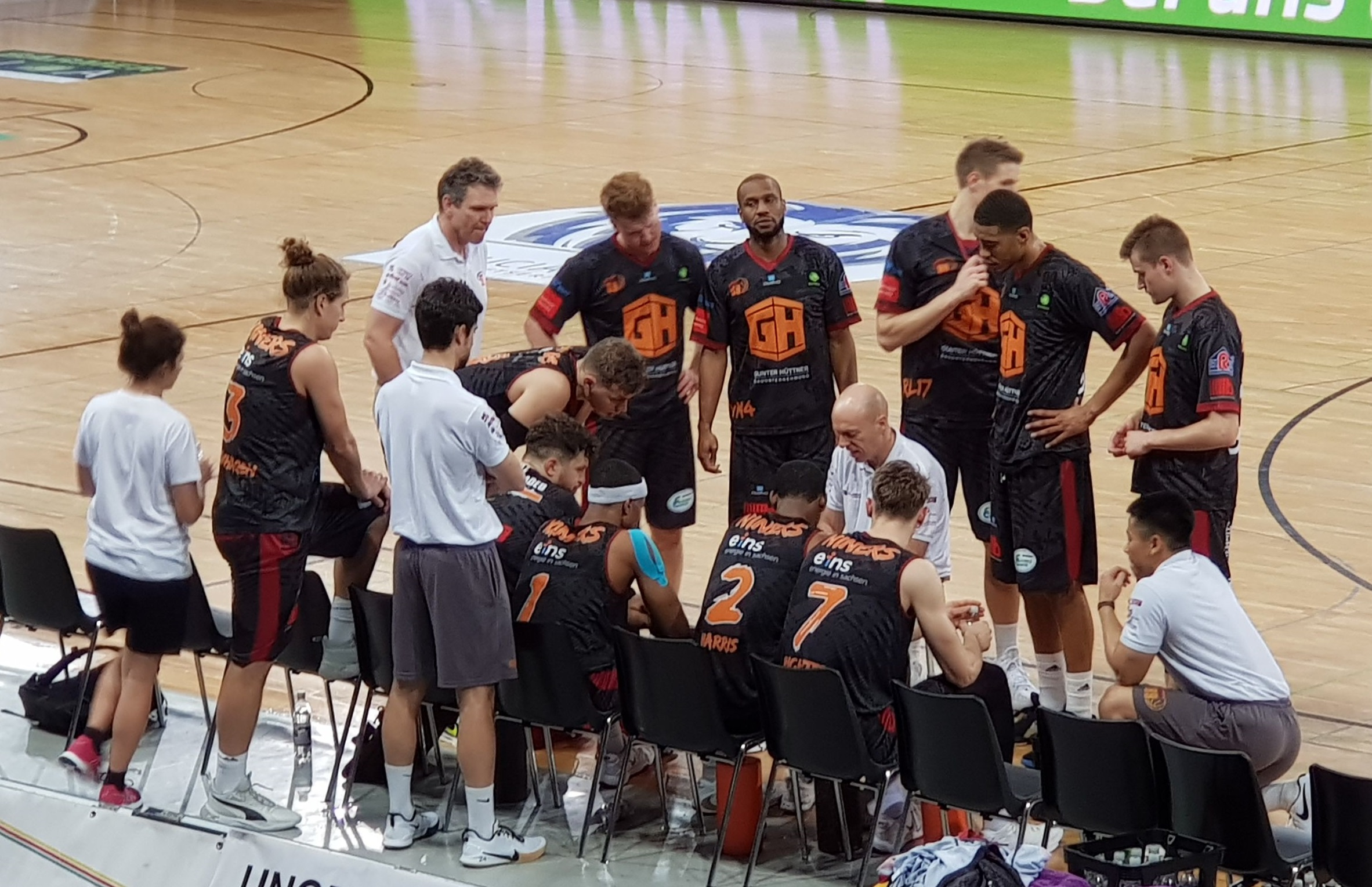
BV Chemnitz 99 in January 2020

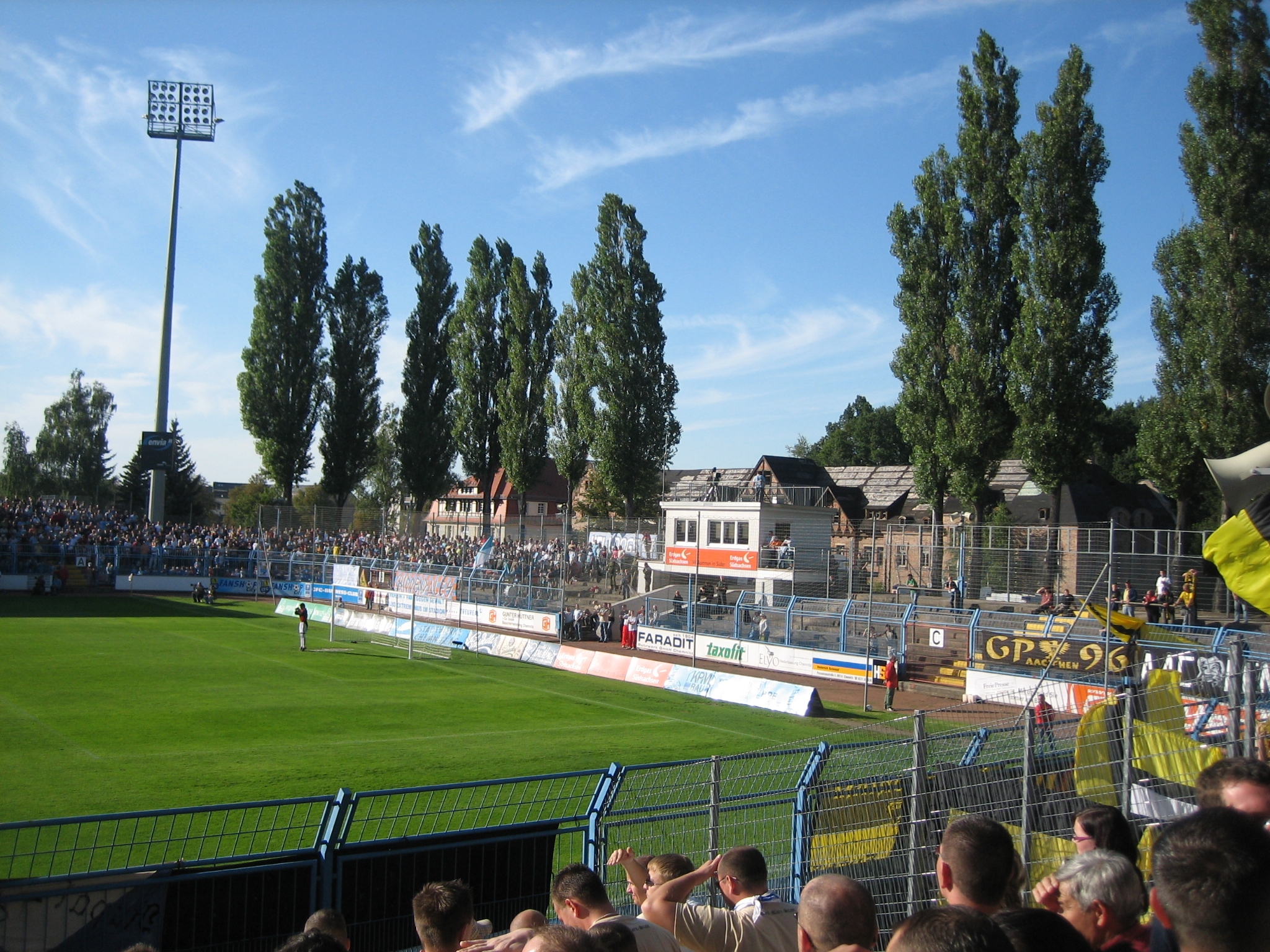
Stadion an der Gellertstraße

- BV Chemnitz 99 (basketball, men)
- Chemnitzer FC (football)
- Chemnitzer PSV (football, handball, volleyball)
- Chemcats Chemnitz (basketball, women)
- VfB Fortuna Chemnitz (football)
- Post SV Chemnitz (swimming)
- Schwimmclub Chemnitz v. 1892 e.V. (swimming)
- TSV Einheit Süd Chemnitz (swimming, gymnastics, volleyball, skittles)
- ERC Chemnitz e.V. (ice hockey, skater hockey)
- CTC-Küchwald (tennis)
- Floor Fighters Chemnitz (floorball)
- ESV LOK Chemnitz (luge)
- Chemnitzer EC (figure skating, ice dancing, curling)
- Chemnitz Crusaders (American football)
- Tower Rugby Chemnitz (rugby)
- SV Eiche Reichenbrand (football)
- USG Chemnitz e.V. abt Cricket Club (cricket)

== Notable people ==
- Paul Oswald Ahnert (1897–1989), astronomer
- Brigitte Ahrens (born 1945), pop singer
- Olaf Altmann (born 1960), scenic designer
- Mark Arndt (born 1941), Russian Orthodox Archbishop
- Michael Ballack (born 1976), German footballer, former captain of Bayern Munich and Germany
- Veronika Bellmann (born 1960), politician
- Fritz Bennewitz (1926–1995), theater director
- Gerd Böckmann (born 1944), television actor and director
- Werner Bräunig (1934–1976), writer
- Marianne Brandt (1893–1983), artist, designer
- Valery Bykovsky (1934–2019), Soviet cosmonaut
- C418 (real name Daniel Rosenfeld, born 1989), music producer and sound engineer for Minecraft and Wanderstop
- Hans Carl von Carlowitz (1645–1714), forest scientist
- Max Eckert-Greifendorff (1868–1938), cartographer and professor
- Gerson Goldhaber (1924–2010), American nuclear and astrophysicist
- Friedrich Goldmann (1941–2009), composer and conductor
- Carl Hahn (1926–2023), businessman, head of the Volkswagen Group
- Johannes Hähle (1906–1944), military photographer
- Peter Härtling (1933-2017), writer
- Richard Hartmann (1809–1878), important entrepreneur ("Saxon locomotive king")
- Frank Heinrich (born 1964), politician, member of the Bundestag
- Stephan Hermlin (1915–1997), writer
- Stefan Heym (1913–2001), writer and member of the Bundestag of the PDS
- Christian Gottlob Heyne (1729–1812), classical scholar and archaeologist
- Sigmund Jähn (1937–2019), first German astronaut (Interkosmos flight of August 26, 1978)
- Eduard Johnson (1840-1903), local historian, journalist, author of Latin and Greek phrasebooks
- John Kluge (1921–2010), German-American billionaire and media mogul
- Eva Kunz (1947–2023), politician
- Helga Lindner (born 1951), swimmer; Olympic silver medalist
- Max Littmann (1862–1931), architect
- Anja Mittag (born 1985), footballer, World Champion 2007
- Frederick and William Nevoigt, founders of the Diamant bicycle brand
- Carsten Nicolai (born 1965), contemporary artist
- Frei Otto (1925–2015), architect, architectural theorist and professor of architecture, builder of the Munich Olympic Park
- Sylke Otto (born 1969), luge
- Siegfried Rapp (1917–1977), one-armed German pianist
- Frederick Emil Resche (1866–1946), U.S. Army brigadier general
- Frank Rost (born 1973), retired football goalkeeper
- Bruno Salzer (1859–1919), one of Chemnitz's leading entrepreneurs
- Aliona Savchenko, ice figure skater
- Helmut Schelsky (1912–1984), sociologist and university lecturer
- Karl Schmidt-Rottluff (1884–1976), painter and graphic artist of expressionism
- Maria Schüppel (1923–2011), composer and pioneering music therapist
- Christina Schultheiß (1918–2016), civil engineer, best known for her involvement in the Protestant church in East Germany.
- Matthias Schweighöfer (born 1981), actor and film director
- Jörg Schüttauf (born 1961), actor
- Nadja Stefanoff (born 1983), soprano
- Matthias Steiner (born 1982), German-Austrian weightlifter, Olympic gold medalist 2008
- Ingo Steuer (born 1966), figure skater
- Robin Szolkowy, ice figure skater
- Hans-Günther Thalheim (1924–2018), Germanist and linguist
- Johannes Thümmler (1906-2002), Obersturmbannführer
- Luise Emilie Tschersich (born 1998) actress
- Tom Unger (born 1985), politician (CDU)
- Siegfried Vogel (born 1937), operatic bass
- Kurt Wagner (1904–1989), German general
- Katarina Witt (born 1965), figure skater
- Mandy Wötzel (born 1973), figure skater
- Klaus Wunderlich (1931–1997), organist

== Twin towns – sister cities ==
Chemnitz is twinned with:

- Tampere, Finland (1961)
- Ljubljana, Slovenia (1966)
- Timbuktu, Mali (1968)
- Ústí nad Labem, Czech Republic (1970)
- Łódź, Poland (1972)
- Mulhouse, France (1981)
- Manchester, England, UK (1983)
- Volgograd, Russia (1988)
- Düsseldorf, Germany (1988)
- Akron, United States (1997)
- Taiyuan, China (1999)
- Kiryat Bialik, Israel (2022)

Former twin cities:

- Arras, France (1967 to 2021)

== See also ==
- 2018 Chemnitz protests
