= Politics of Saxony =

Overview of the politics of Saxony

The politics of the German state of Saxony take place within a framework of a federal parliamentary representative democratic republic, where the Federal Government of Germany exercises sovereign rights with certain powers reserved to the states of Germany including Saxony-Anhalt. The three main parties are the centre-right Christian Democratic Union, the far-right Alternative for Germany (AfD), and the populist left-wing Sahra Wagenknecht Alliance (BSW).

Every five years, all Germans residing in the State over the age of 18 elect the members of the Landtag of Saxony. This regional parliament or legislature then elects the Minister-President and confirms the cabinet members.

The Christian Democratic Union (CDU) has been the largest party in every election since the first election in 1990 Saxony state election following the reunification of Germany.

== List of minister-presidents of Saxony ==
There have been four minister-presidents of Saxony since reunification.

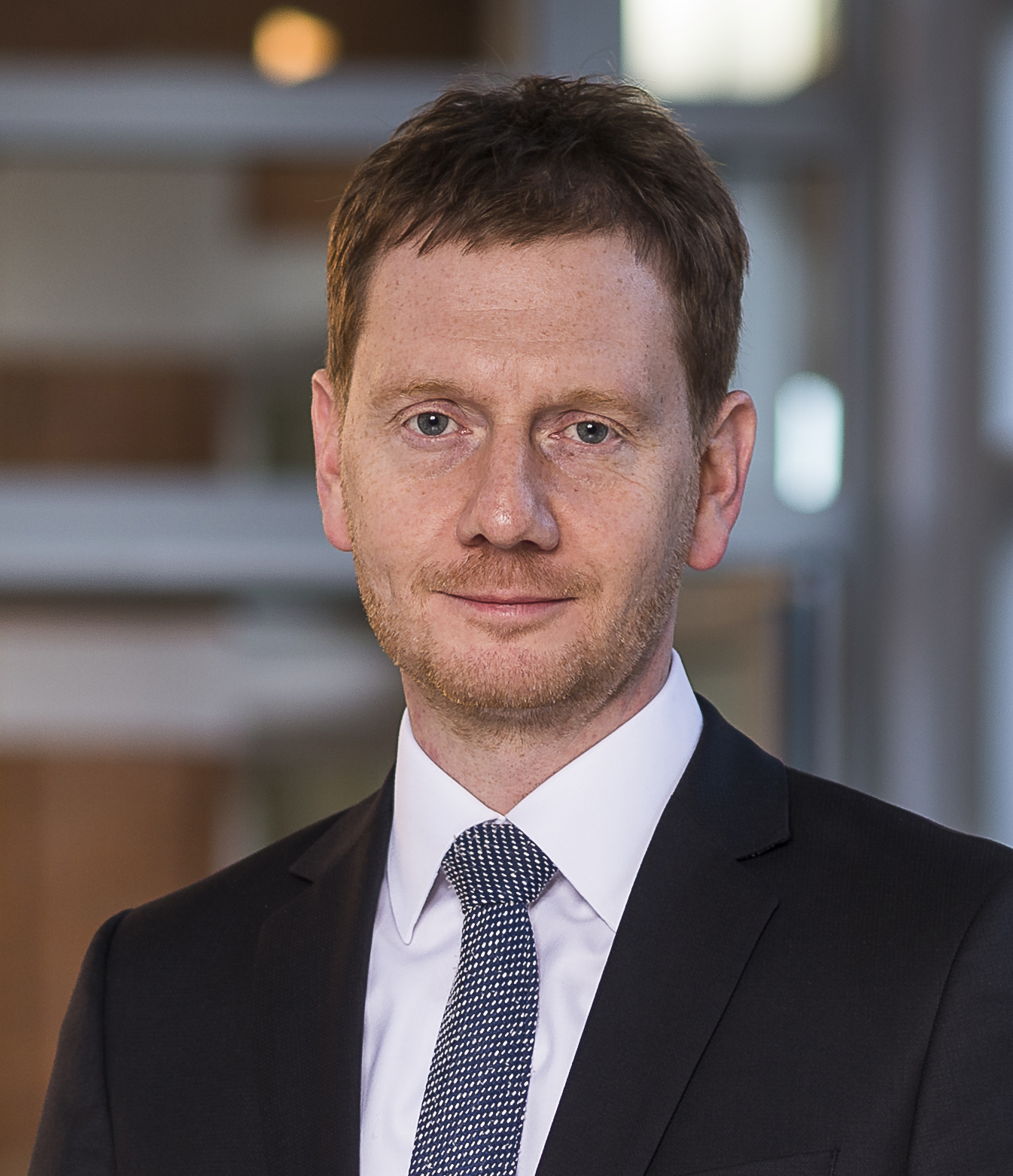
Michael Kretschmer, incumbent minister-president

1. 1990 - 2002: Kurt Biedenkopf (CDU)
2. 2002 - 2008: Georg Milbradt (CDU)
3. 2008 - 2017: Stanislaw Tillich (CDU)
4. Since 2017: Michael Kretschmer (CDU)

== Landtag of Saxony ==
=== Party strength in the Landtag ===
Election year	Total seats	Seats won									
Election year	Total seats	CDU	SPD	PDS	FDP	Grüne	NDP	Linke	AfD	BSW	FW
1990	160	92	32	17	9	10					
1994	120	77	22	21							
1999	120	76	14	21							
2004	124	55	13	31	7	6	12				
2009	132	58	14		14	9	8	29			
2014	126	59	18			8		27	14		
2019	119	45	10			12		14	38		
2024	120	41	10			7		6	40	15	1

=== Legislative compositions ===
1990 Saxony state election

1994 Saxony state election

1999 Saxony state election

2004 Saxony state election

2009 Saxony state election

2014 Saxony state election

2019 Saxony state election

2024 Saxony state election

=== State election results maps ===
1990 Saxony state election, Black is CDU

1994 Saxony state election, Black is CDU

1999 Saxony state election, Black is CDU

2004 Saxony state election, Black is CDU, Pink is PDS, Red is SPD

2009 Saxony state election, Black is CDU, Pink is Left

2014 Saxony state election, Black is CDU, Pink is Left

2019 Saxony state election, Black is CDU, AfD is Blue, Green is A90/Green, Pink is Left

2024 Saxony state election, AfD is Blue, Black is CDU, Green is A90/Green, Pink is Left

=== Constituencies in the Landtag ===
==== Since 2014 ====
No	Constituency	Member	2024	2019	2014
1	Vogtland 1	Jörg Schmidt	CDU	AfD	CDU
2	Vogtland 2	Sören Voigt	CDU	CDU	CDU
3	Vogtland 3	René Standke	AfD	CDU	CDU
	Vogtland 4	Abolished		CDU	CDU
4	Zwickau 1	Kerstin Nicolaus	CDU	CDU	CDU
5	Zwickau 2	Heiko Gumprecht	AfD	CDU	CDU
6	Zwickau 3	Jonas Dünzel	AfD	CDU	CDU
7	Zwickau 4	Daniela Pfeifer	CDU	CDU	CDU
8	Zwickau 5	Mike Moncsek	AfD	CDU	CDU
9	Chemnitz 1	Peter Patt	CDU	CDU	CDU
10	Chemnitz 2	Alexander Dierks	CDU	CDU	CDU
11	Chemnitz 3	Ines Saborowski	CDU	CDU	CDU
12	Erzgebirge 1	Karja Dietz	AfD	CDU	CDU
13	Erzgebirge 2	Peter Bachmann	AfD	CDU	CDU
14	Erzgebirge 3	Thomas Thumm	AfD	AfD	CDU
15	Erzgebirge 4	Thomas Prantl	AfD	CDU	CDU
16	Erzgebirge 5	Arthur Österle	AfD	CDU	CDU
17	Mittelsachsen 1	Marko Winter	AfD	CDU	CDU
18	Mittelsachsen 2	Romy Penz	AfD	AfD	CDU
19	Mittelsachsen 3	Thomas Schmidt	CDU	CDU	CDU
20	Mittelsachsen 4	René Standke	AfD	AfD	CDU
	Mittelsachsen 5	Abolished		CDU	CDU
21	Leipzig Land 1	Georg-Ludwig von Breitenbuch	CDU	CDU	CDU
22	Leipzig Land 2	Oliver Fritzsche	CDU	CDU	CDU
23	Leipzig Land 3	Matthias Berger	FW	CDU	CDU
24	Leipzig Land 4	Kay Ritter	CDU	CDU	CDU
25	Leipzig 1	Nam Duy Nguyen	Left	CDU	CDU
26	Leipzig 2	René Standke	CDU	Left	Left
27	Leipzig 3	Wolf-Dietrich Rost	CDU	CDU	CDU
28	Leipzig 4	Juliane Nagel	Left	Green	CDU
29	Leipzig 5	Andreas Nowak	CDU	Green	CDU
30	Leipzig 6	Claudia Maicher	Green	CDU	CDU
31	Leipzig 7	Rik Ulbricht	CDU	CDU	CDU
32	Leipzig 8	Holger Gasse	CDU	Created in 2024	
33	Nordsachsen 1	Tina Trompter	CDU	CDU	CDU
34	Nordsachsen 2	Ferdinand Wiedeburg	AfD	CDU	CDU
35	Nordsachsen 3	Tobias Heller	AfD	AfD	CDU
36	Meißen 1	Carsten Hütter	AfD	AfD	CDU
37	Meißen 2	Mario Beger	AfD	AfD	CDU
38	Meißen 3	Thomas Kirste	AfD	AfD	CDU
39	Meißen 4	Sven Eppinger	CDU	CDU	CDU
40	Dresden 1	Christian Hartmann	CDU	CDU	CDU
41	Dresden 2	Thomas Löser	Grüne	CDU	CDU
42	Dresden 3	Christian Piwarz	CDU	CDU	CDU
43	Dresden 4	Frank Kromer	CDU	CDU	CDU
44	Dresden 5	Martin Modschiedler	CDU	Grüne	CDU
45	Dresden 6	Barbara Klepsch	CDU	CDU	CDU
46	Dresden 7	Felix Hitzig	CDU	CDU	CDU
47	Dresden 8	Ingo Flemming	CDU	Created in 2024	
48	Sächsische Schweiz-Osterzgebirge 1	Norbert Mayer	AfD	CDU	CDU
49	Sächsische Schweiz-Osterzgebirge 2	André Barth	AfD	CDU	CDU
50	Sächsische Schweiz-Osterzgebirge 3	Jan-Oliver Zwerg	AfD	AfD	CDU
51	Sächsische Schweiz-Osterzgebirge 4	Martin Braukmann	AfD	AfD	CDU
52	Bautzen 1/Budyšin 1	Frank Peschel	AfD	AfD	CDU
53	Bautzen 2/Budyšin 2	Elaine Jentsch	CDU	CDU	CDU
54	Bautzen 3/Budyšin 3	Timo Schreyer	AfD	AfD	CDU
55	Bautzen 4/Budyšin 4	Doreen Schwietzer	AfD	AfD	CDU
56	Bautzen 5/Budyšin 5	Jörg Urban	AfD	CDU	CDU
57	Görlitz 1/Zhorjelc 1	Roberto Kuhnert	AfD	AfD	CDU
58	Görlitz 2	Michael Kretschmer	CDU	CDU	CDU
59	Görlitz 3	Roman Golombek	AfD	AfD	CDU
60	Görlitz 4	Hajo Exner	AfD	CDU	CDU

== Constituencies in the Bundestag ==
No	Constituency	Member	2021	Voters	2017	2013	2009	2005	2002	1998	1994	1990
150	Nordsachsen	René Bochmann	AfD	161,279	CDU	CDU	CDU	CDU	CDU	SPD	CDU	CDU
151	Leipzig I	Jens Lehmann	CDU	224,100	CDU	CDU	CDU	SPD	SPD	SPD	CDU	CDU
152	Leipzig II	Sören Pellmann	Left	231,178	Left	CDU	CDU	SPD	SPD	SPD	CDU	CDU
153	Leipzig-Land	Edgar Naujok	AfD	212,854	CDU	CDU	CDU	CDU	SPD	SPD	CDU	CDU
154	Meißen	Barbara Lenk	AfD	197,004	CDU	CDU	CDU	Created for 2009 election				
155	Bautzen I	Karsten Hilse	AfD	206,895	AfD	CDU	CDU	Created for 2009 election				
156	Görlitz	Tino Chrupalla	AfD	204,105	AfD	CDU	CDU	CDU	CDU	CDU	CDU	CDU
157	Sächsische Schweiz-Osterzgebirge	Steffen Janich	AfD	199,703	AfD	CDU	CDU	CDU	CDU	Created for 2002 election		
158	Dresden I	Markus Reichel	CDU	228,643	CDU	CDU	CDU	CDU	CDU	CDU	CDU	CDU
159	Dresden II – Bautzen II	Lars Rohwer	CDU	234,432	CDU	CDU	CDU	CDU	CDU	CDU	CDU	CDU
160	Mittelsachsen	Carolin Bachmann	AfD	193,828	CDU	CDU	CDU	Created for 2009 election				
161	Chemnitz	Detlef Müller	SPD	188,691	CDU	CDU	CDU	SPD	SPD	SPD	CDU	CDU
162	Chemnitzer Umland – Erzgebirgskreis II	Mike Moncsek	AfD	177,211	CDU	CDU	CDU	Created for 2009 election				
163	Erzgebirgskreis I	Thomas Dietz	AfD	210,941	CDU	CDU	CDU	Created for 2009 election				
164	Zwickau	Matthias Moosdorf	AfD	197,831	CDU	CDU	CDU	CDU	CDU	CDU	CDU	CDU
165	Vogtlandkreis	Yvonne Magwas	CDU	184,973	CDU	CDU	CDU	CDU	CDU	SPD	CDU	CDU

=== Bundestag election results ===
Election year	% won	% won								
Election year	% won	CDU	SPD	PDS	FDP	Grüne	NDP	Linke	AfD	BSW
1990	100	49.5	18.2	9.0	12.4	5.9				
1994	100	48.0	24.3	16.7	3.8	4.8				
1998	100	32.7	29.1	20.0	3.7	4.4				
2002	100	33.6	33.3	16.2	7.3	4.6				
2005	100	30.0	24.5		10.2	4.8	4.8	22.8		
2009	100	35.6	14.6		13.3	6.7		24.5		
2013	100	42.6	14.6		3.1	4.9		20.0	6.8	
2017	100	26.9	10.5		8.2	4.6		16.1	27.0	
2021	100	17.2	19.3		11.0	8.6		9.3	24.6	
2025	100	19.7	8.5		3.2	6.5		11.3	37.3	9.0

== See also ==
- Landtag of Saxony
- List of presidents of the Landtag of Saxony
- 1990 Saxony state election
- 1994 Saxony state election
- 1999 Saxony state election
- 2004 Saxony state election
- 2009 Saxony state election
- 2014 Saxony state election
- 2019 Saxony state election
- 2024 Saxony state election
- New states of Germany
- Politics of East Germany
