= Axel Viehweger =

German politician (born 1952)

Minister for Construction, Urban Development and Housing
- In office 12 April 1990 – 28 September 1990
- Minister-President: Lothar de Maizière
- Preceded by: Gerhard Baumgärtel (Construction and Housing)
- Succeeded by: Position abolished Gerda Hasselfeldt (as Federal Minister for Regional Planning, Construction and Urban Development)
Parliamentary constituencies
Member of the Landtag of Saxony
In office 27 October 1990 – 6 October 1994
Preceded by	Constituency established
Succeeded by	multi-member district

Personal details
- Born: Axel Viehweger; 27 November 1952 (age 73) Waldenburg, Bezirk Chemnitz, East Germany (now Saxony, Germany)
- Party: Independent (1991–)
- Other political affiliations: Free Democratic Party (1990–1991); Association of Free Democrats (1990); Liberal Democratic Party of Germany (1970–1990)
- Education: Dresden University of Technology (Dr.-Ing.)
- Occupation: Politician; Civil Servant; Research Assistant

Axel Viehweger (born 27 November 1952) is a German housing cooperative functionary and former politician.

In the German Democratic Republic, he served as Minister for Construction, Urban Development and Housing of the GDR in the cabinet of Lothar de Maizière.

== Life and career ==
=== Early career ===
Viehweger attended the Extended Secondary School (EOS) and completed his high school diploma.

From 1973 to 1978, he studied Energy Engineering and Nuclear Physics at the Dresden University of Technology, which he completed a with a degree in physics (Dipl.-Phys.). He then worked at the university's Institute of Energetics, from 1984 to 1985 as a research associate. He obtained his doctorate (Dr.-Ing.) in 1985 on the topic "A Contribution to Determining 'Favorable' Hydraulic Operating Regimes for Hot Water District Heating Networks in Emergency Conditions or Planned Shutdowns".

=== Bloc party politician ===
Viehweger joined the Liberal Democratic Party of Germany (LDPD), an East German bloc party beholden to the ruling Socialist Unity Party (SED), in 1970.

Parallel to his academic career, Viehweger became active in local politics. From 1979 to 1985, he was a member of the District Assembly of Dresden-West. From 1981 to 1985, he additionally was chairman of the Dresden-West LDPD and from 1986 to 1990, chairman of the Dresden LDPD.

In 1985, he was made full-time city councilor (member of the municipal government) for energy of Dresden, a position he held until 1990. He later described his work there as "Saving electricity, distributing coal".

=== de Maizière Government ===
After the Wende, the LDP, its new name after being renamed in February 1990, joined forces with the other liberal parties in the GDR to form the Association of Free Democrats (BFD). Viehweger became a member of the executive committee of the BFD.

From April to September 1990, Viehweger served as the last Minister for Construction, Urban Development and Housing in the cabinet of Lothar de Maizière. Despite the BFD leaving the government coalition in July 1990, Viehweger remained minister.

As Minister, Viehweger was mainly tasked with renovating the crumbling cities and introducing market economy principles in this sector, including liberalizing the construction industry and creating a free housing market. Of the approximately 4,500 employees, almost 90% were laid off or outsourced to other institutions. The numerous research institutes assigned to the ministry, such as the GDR Construction Academy, were either be dissolved or transferred to other legal entities by 3 October 1990. The housing construction combines, which were also under the responsibility of the ministry, were taken over by the Treuhandanstalt.

He resigned from his position on 28 September 1990, following the disclosure of allegations of now disproven collaboration with the Stasi under the pseudonym "Jens Grabowski," as well as the recommendation for immediate resignation. As a city councilor in Dresden, he is said to have maintained contacts with the Stasi. Viehweger admitted this, but denied having signed an IM declaration and passing on documents.

=== Reunified Germany ===
Despite the allegations, he remained the lead candidate of the Saxon FDP for the inaugural state election on 14 October 1990.

During the first legislative period, he was a member of the Saxon State Parliament from 1990, elected from the state list of the FDP. According to a report in the Sächsische Zeitung on 13 November 1990, Viehweger was on leave from his parliamentary mandate until March 1991 "at the request of the FDP parliamentary group and after a conversation with the FDP federal chairman Graf Lambsdorff" until the Stasi allegations against him were clarified.

On 4 November 1991, Viehweger was expelled from the parliamentary group. Subsequently, he resigned from the FDP and remained a member of the state parliament as an independent member for the rest of the legislative period ending in 1994.

Already during the legislative period, Viehweger began working in various positions in the housing industry. From 2000 to 2002 he was head of the Central and Eastern Europe working group of CECODHAS (Association of the European Social Housing Industry). From 1 January 2002 to 31 December 2019, Viehweger was director and board member of the Association of Saxon Housing Cooperatives.

On 11 October 2022, Viehweger was elected chairman of the Volkssolidarität Dresden e.V. He currently lives in Berlin-Wilhelmsruh.
