= Dresden 4 =

State electoral district of Germany

43: Dresden 4
- Electoral district for the Landtag of Saxony
- Dresden 4 in 2024
- District: Dresden
- Electorate: 54,080 (2024)
- Major settlements: Tolkewitz/Seidnitz-Nord and Seidnitz/Dobritz from city-district Blasewitz; and the Prohlis district excluding Strehlen

Current electoral district
- Party: CDU
- Member: Dr. Frank Kromer

Dresden 4 is an electoral constituency (German: Wahlkreis) represented in the Landtag of Saxony. It elects one member via first-past-the-post voting. Under the constituency numbering system, it is designated as constituency 43. It is within the city of Dresden.

== Geography ==
The constituency comprises the Tolkewitz/Seidnitz-Nord and Seidnitz/Dobritz from the city-district of Blasewitz, and the Prohlis district excluding Strehlen within the city of Dresden.

There were 54,080 eligible voters in 2024.

== Members ==
Election	Member	Party	%
2014	Martin Modschiedler	CDU	35.4
2019	Martin Modschiedler	CDU	30.7
2024	Frank Kromer	CDU	38.5

== Election results ==
=== 2024 election ===
State election (2024): Dresden 4
Notes:	Blue background denotes the winner of the electorate vote. Pink background denotes a candidate elected from their party list. Yellow background denotes an electorate win by a list member, or other incumbent. A ✓ or ✗ denotes status of any incumbent, win or lose respectively.						
Party	Candidate	Votes	%	±%	Party votes	%	±%
CDU	Frank Kromer	15,099	38.5	▲8.2	12,957	32.8	▲4.1
AfD	André Wendt	13,393	34.2	▲3.9	11,448	29.0	▲1.5
BSW					4,691	11.9	
SPD	Anne Schawohl	2,920	7.5	▼1.8	3,235	8.2	▲0.1
Left	Margot Gaitzsch	2,463	6.3	▼6.2	1,310	3.3	▼7.0
FW	Jens Genschmar	2,453	6.3		765	1.9	▼2.0
Greens	Wolf-Georg Winkler	1,835	4.7	▼5.1	2,218	5.6	▼3.4
FDP	Max Wendling	658	1.7	▼4.7	423	1.1	▼5.6
Freie Sachsen	René Despang	364	0.9		947	2.4	
APT					433	1.1	
PARTEI					310	0.8	▼0.8
Pirates					191	0.5	
BD					147	0.4	
Values					116	0.3	
dieBasis					95	0.2	
V-Partei3					64	0.2	
Bündnis C					59	0.1	
ÖDP					46	0.1	
BüSo					29	0.1	
Informal votes		583			284		
Total valid votes		39,185			39,484		
Turnout		39,768	73.5	▲4.3			
CDU hold	Majority	1,706	4.3				

=== 2019 election ===
State election (2019): Dresden 4
Notes:	Blue background denotes the winner of the electorate vote. Pink background denotes a candidate elected from their party list. Yellow background denotes an electorate win by a list member, or other incumbent. A ✓ or ✗ denotes status of any incumbent, win or lose respectively.						
Party	Candidate	Votes	%	±%	Party votes	%	±%
CDU	✓ Martin Modschiedler	13,650	30.7	▼4.7	13,126	29.3	▼6.7
AfD	Martina Jost	9,617	21.6	▲14.0	8,823	19.7	▲12.1
Greens	Dietrich Herrmann	8,138	18.3	▲7.3	7,436	16.6	▲5.4
Left	Tilo Wirtz	5,699	12.8	▼7.3	4,574	10.2	▼7.6
SPD	Christian Kreß	4,439	10.0	▼4.7	4,169	9.3	▼5.2
FDP	Steve Görnitz	2,475	5.6	▲1.7	2,761	6.2	▲2.0
FW					1,348	3.0	▲1.5
PARTEI					810	1.8	▲0.6
APT					504	1.1	Steady
ÖDP					237	0.5	
Verjüngungsforschung					193	0.4	
Pirates					185	0.4	▼1.1
Humanists					165	0.4	
The Blue Party					112	0.3	
NPD					104	0.2	▼2.8
BüSo	Holger Frömmel	502	1.1	▲0.6	78	0.2	▼0.1
Awakening of German Patriots - Central Germany					51	0.1	
PDV					47	0.1	
DKP					31	0.1	
Informal votes		548			314		
Total valid votes		44,520			44,754		
Turnout		45,068	74.5	▲14.0			
CDU hold	Majority	4,033	9.1	▼6.2			

=== 2014 election ===
State election (2014): Dresden 4
Notes:	Blue background denotes the winner of the electorate vote. Pink background denotes a candidate elected from their party list. Yellow background denotes an electorate win by a list member, or other incumbent. A ✓ or ✗ denotes status of any incumbent, win or lose respectively.						
Party	Candidate	Votes	%	±%	Party votes	%	±%
CDU	Martin Modschiedler	12,662	35.4		12,948	36.0	
Left		7,196	20.1		6,392	17.8	
SPD		5,261	14.7		5,194	14.5	
Greens		3,922	11.0		4,008	11.2	
AfD		2,739	7.6		2,742	7.6	
FDP		1,411	3.9		1,499	4.2	
NPD		918	2.6		1,068	3.0	
FW		865	2.4		528	1.5	
Pirates		661	1.8		555	1.5	
PARTEI					418	1.2	
APT					378	1.1	
BüSo		179	0.5		117	0.3	
Pro Germany Citizens' Movement					51	0.1	
DSU					45	0.1	
Informal votes		466			337		
Total valid votes		35,814			35,943		
Turnout		36,280	60.5	▲0.9			
CDU win new seat	Majority	5,466	15.3				

== See also ==
- Politics of Saxony
- Landtag of Saxony
