= Zwickau 1 =

State electoral district of Germany

4: Zwickau 1
- Electoral district for the Landtag of Saxony
- Zwickau 1 in 2024
- District: Zwickau
- Electorate: 45,919 (2024)
- Major settlements: Hartenstein, Kirchberg, Wildenfels, and Wilkau-Haßlau

Current electoral district
- Party: CDU
- Member: Kerstin Nicolaus

Zwickau 1 is an electoral constituency (German: Wahlkreis) represented in the Landtag of Saxony. It elects one member via first-past-the-post voting. Under the constituency numbering system, it is designated as constituency 4. It is within the district of Zwickau.

== Geography ==
The constituency includes the towns of Hartenstein, Kirchberg, Wildenfels, and Wilkau-Haßlau, and the municipalities of Crinitzberg, Hartmannsdorf, Hirschfeld, Langenweißbach, Lichtentanne, Mülsen, Reinsdorf within Zwickau.

There were 45,919 eligible voters in 2024

== Members ==
Election	Member	Party	%
2014	Kerstin Nicolaus	CDU	43.4
2019	Kerstin Nicolaus	CDU	39.7
2024	Kerstin Nicolaus	CDU	37.8

== Election results ==
=== 2024 election ===
State election (2024): Zwickau 1
Notes:	Blue background denotes the winner of the electorate vote. Pink background denotes a candidate elected from their party list. Yellow background denotes an electorate win by a list member, or other incumbent. A ✓ or ✗ denotes status of any incumbent, win or lose respectively.						
Party	Candidate	Votes	%	±%	Party votes	%	±%
CDU	✓ Kerstin Nicolaus	13,281	37.8	▼1.9	12,634	35.8	▼3.4
AfD	Jens Helmar Breitfeld	12,635	35.9	▲7.0	11,941	33.8	▲4.9
BSW	Sascha Wünsch	3,980	11.3		4,670	13.2	
SPD	Steffi Heinzig	1,511	4.3	▼2.2	1,732	4.9	▼1.7
FW	Moritz Schüller	1,405	4.0	▼1.8	901	2.6	▼0.9
Left	Frank Dittrich	748	2.1	▼7.6	633	1.8	▼7.0
Greens	Lars Dörner	501	1.4	▼3.3	573	1.6	▼2.6
FDP	Raphael Roch	423	1.2	▼3.4	246	0.7	▼3.2
Freie Sachsen	Peggy Lohße	236	0.7		754	2.1	
APT					330	0.9	
Bündnis C					264	0.7	
PARTEI					167	0.5	▼0.5
Values	S. Schmalfuß	226	0.6		155	0.4	
dieBasis	Michael Goldberger	221	0.6		115	0.3	
BD					71	0.2	
Pirates					42	0.1	
ÖDP					29	0.1	
V-Partei3					25	0.1	
BüSo					12	0.0	
Informal votes		403			276		
Total valid votes		35,167			35,294		
Turnout		35,570	77.5	▲8.0			
CDU hold	Majority	354	1.9				

=== 2019 election ===
State election (2019): Zwickau 1
Notes:	Blue background denotes the winner of the electorate vote. Pink background denotes a candidate elected from their party list. Yellow background denotes an electorate win by a list member, or other incumbent. A ✓ or ✗ denotes status of any incumbent, win or lose respectively.						
Party	Candidate	Votes	%	±%	Party votes	%	±%
CDU	✓ Kerstin Nicolaus	12,864	39.7	▼3.7	12,763	39.2	▼7.3
AfD		9,391	29.0		9,424	28.9	▲19.4
Left		3,154	9.7	▼8.7	2,881	8.8	▼8.5
SPD		2,120	6.5	▼5.2	2,162	6.6	▼3.5
FW		1,874	5.8	▼2.5	1,112	3.4	▲1.0
Greens		1,534	4.7	Steady	1,382	4.2	▲1.2
FDP		1,492	4.6	▼0.6	1,270	3.9	▲0.9
APT					543	1.7	▲0.7
PARTEI					320	1.0	▲0.6
Verjüngungsforschung					155	0.5	
NPD					144	0.4	▼4.7
The Blue Party					103	0.3	
ÖDP					94	0.3	
Pirates					74	0.2	▼0.4
Awakening of German Patriots - Central Germany					58	0.2	
PDV					37	0.1	
DKP					32	0.1	
Humanists					19	0.1	
BüSo					18	0.1	▼0.2
Informal votes		498			336		
Total valid votes		32,429			32,591		
Turnout		32,927	67.7	▲18.2			
CDU hold	Majority	3,473	10.7	▼14.3			

=== 2014 election ===
State election (2014): Zwickau 1
Notes:	Blue background denotes the winner of the electorate vote. Pink background denotes a candidate elected from their party list. Yellow background denotes an electorate win by a list member, or other incumbent. A ✓ or ✗ denotes status of any incumbent, win or lose respectively.						
Party	Candidate	Votes	%	±%	Party votes	%	±%
CDU	Kerstin Nicolaus	10,775	43.4		11,690	46.5	
Left		4,564	18.4		4,352	17.3	
SPD		2,893	11.7		2,539	10.1	
AfD					2,377	9.5	
FW		2,049	8.3		614	2.4	
NPD		1,444	5.8		1,274	5.1	
FDP		1,301	5.2		905	3.6	
Greens		1,155	4.7		757	3.0	
APT					260	1.0	
Pirates		346	1.4		145	0.6	
PARTEI					98	0.4	
BüSo		301	1.2		63	0.3	
DSU					23	0.1	
Pro Germany Citizens' Movement					20	0.1	
Informal votes		646			357		
Total valid votes		24,828			25,117		
Turnout		25,474	49.5	▼11.8			
CDU win new seat	Majority	6,211	25.0				

== See also ==
- Politics of Saxony
- Landtag of Saxony
