= Görlitz 2 =

State electoral district of Germany

58: Görlitz 2
- Electoral district for the Landtag of Saxony
- Görlitz 2 in 2024
- District: Görlitz
- Electorate: 49,869 (2024)
- Major settlements: Görlitz and Reichenbach

Current electoral district
- Party: CDU
- Member: Michael Kreschmer

Görlitz 2 is an electoral constituency (German: Wahlkreis) represented in the Landtag of Saxony. It elects one member via first-past-the-post voting. Under the constituency numbering system, it is designated as constituency 58. It is within the district of Görlitz.

== Geography ==
The constituency comprises the towns of Görlitz and Reichenbach, and the municipalities of Königshain, Markersdorf, and Vierkirchen within the district of Görlitz.

There were 49,869 eligible voters in 2024.

== Members ==
Election	Member	Party	%
2014	Octavian Ursu	CDU	37.1
Jul 2019	Cora Lesch	CDU	
2019	Michael Kretschmer	CDU	45.8
2024	Michael Kretschmer	CDU	47.2

== Election results ==
=== 2024 election ===
State election (2024): Görlitz 2
Notes:	Blue background denotes the winner of the electorate vote. Pink background denotes a candidate elected from their party list. Yellow background denotes an electorate win by a list member, or other incumbent. A ✓ or ✗ denotes status of any incumbent, win or lose respectively.						
Party	Candidate	Votes	%	±%	Party votes	%	±%
CDU	✓ Michael Kretschmer	16,689	47.2	▲1.3	12,086	34.2	▼1.0
AfD	Sebastian Wippel	13,954	39.4	▲1.5	13,183	37.3	▼0.6
BSW	Franz Nestler	1,743	4.9		3,675	10.4	
Greens	Franziska Schubert	1,190	3.4	▼3.9	1,348	3.8	▼4.1
Left	Johanna-Marie Stiller	960	2.7	▼1.3	1,014	2.9	▼3.4
SPD	H. Egbert Baumann-Haßke	653	1.8	▲0.3	1,707	4.8	▲0.1
Freie Sachsen					635	1.8	
APT					449	1.3	
PARTEI					261	0.7	▼0.7
FDP	Moritz Weber	197	0.6	▼0.6	220	0.6	▼1.9
Values					100	0.3	
BD					96	0.3	
Pirates					84	0.2	
dieBasis					76	0.2	
Bündnis C					60	0.2	
V-Partei3					42	0.1	
ÖDP					19	0.1	
BüSo					18	0.1	
Informal votes		285			283		
Total valid votes		35,386			35,388		
Turnout		35,671	71.5	▲1.9			
CDU hold	Majority	2,735	7.8				

=== 2019 election ===
State election (2019): Görlitz 2
Notes:	Blue background denotes the winner of the electorate vote. Pink background denotes a candidate elected from their party list. Yellow background denotes an electorate win by a list member, or other incumbent. A ✓ or ✗ denotes status of any incumbent, win or lose respectively.						
Party	Candidate	Votes	%	±%	Party votes	%	±%
CDU	Michael Kretschmer	15,940	45.9	▲8.8	12,202	35.2	▼3.2
AfD	Sebastian Wippel	13,173	37.9	▲22.7	13,148	37.9	▲24.1
Greens	Franziska Schubert	2,520	7.2	▼0.5	2,759	7.9	▲2.9
Left	Mirko Schultze	1,402	4.0	▼15.3	2,182	6.3	▼11.6
SPD	Mike Thomas	520	1.5	▼6.6	1,594	4.6	▼6.2
FDP	Stefan Waurich	407	1.2	▼4.8	864	2.5	▼1.5
PARTEI	Michael Krause	419	1.2		491	1.4	▲0.7
FW	Frank Hannig	337	1.0		486	1.4	▲0.1
APT					395	1.1	▼0.2
Verjüngungsforschung					99	0.3	
NPD					90	0.3	▼4.8
The Blue Party					77	0.2	
Pirates					76	0.2	▼0.9
Awakening of German Patriots - Central Germany					59	0.2	
ÖDP					53	0.2	
Humanists					49	0.1	
BüSo	Dietmar Jakowitz	44	0.1		34	0.1	▼0.1
DKP					25	0.1	
PDV					22	0.1	
Informal votes		253			310		
Total valid votes		34,762			34,705		
Turnout		35,015	67.0	▲23.8			
CDU hold	Majority	2,767	8.0	▼9.8			

=== 2014 election ===
State election (2014): Gorlitz 2
Notes:	Blue background denotes the winner of the electorate vote. Pink background denotes a candidate elected from their party list. Yellow background denotes an electorate win by a list member, or other incumbent. A ✓ or ✗ denotes status of any incumbent, win or lose respectively.						
Party	Candidate	Votes	%	±%	Party votes	%	±%
CDU	Octavian Ursu	8,492	37.1		8,852	38.4	
Left		4,425	19.3		4,120	17.9	
AfD		3,469	15.2		3,173	13.8	
SPD		1,853	8.1		2,482	10.8	
Greens		1,763	7.7		1,141	5.0	
FDP		1,385	6.0		916	4.0	
NPD		1,112	4.9		1,171	5.1	
APT					308	1.3	
FW					302	1.3	
Pirates		398	1.7		263	1.1	
PARTEI					151	0.7	
BüSo					57	0.2	
Pro Germany Citizens' Movement					57	0.2	
DSU					30	0.1	
Informal votes		507			381		
Total valid votes		22,897			23,023		
Turnout		23,404	43.2	▼5.4			
CDU win new seat	Majority	4,067	17.8				

== See also ==
- Politics of Saxony
- Landtag of Saxony
