= Mittelsachsen 1 =

State electoral district of Germany

17: Mittelsachsen 1
- Electoral district for the Landtag of Saxony
- Mittelsachsen 1 in 2024
- District: Mittelsachsen
- Electorate: 59,644 (2024)
- Major settlements: Frauenstein, Freiberg, Großschirma, and Sayda

Current electoral district
- Party: AfD
- Member: Marko Winter

Mittelsachsen 1 is an electoral constituency (German: Wahlkreis) represented in the Landtag of Saxony. It elects one member via first-past-the-post voting. Under the constituency numbering system, it is designated as constituency 17. It is within the district of Mittelsachsen.

== Geography ==
The constituency comprises the towns of Frauenstein, Freiberg, Großschirma, and Sayda, and the districts of Bobritzsch-Hilbersdorf, Dorfchemnitz, Halsbrücke, Lichtenberg, Mulda, Neuhausen, Rechenberg-Bienenmühle, and Reinsberg within Mittelsachsen.

There were 59,644 eligible voters in 2024.

== Members ==
Election	Member	Party	%
2014	Gernot Krasselt	CDU	50.0
2019	Susan Leithoff	CDU	35.0
2024	Marko Winter	AfD	39.6

== Election results ==
=== 2024 election ===
State election (2024): Mittelsachsen 1
Notes:	Blue background denotes the winner of the electorate vote. Pink background denotes a candidate elected from their party list. Yellow background denotes an electorate win by a list member, or other incumbent. A ✓ or ✗ denotes status of any incumbent, win or lose respectively.						
Party	Candidate	Votes	%	±%	Party votes	%	±%
AfD	Marko Winter	17,506	39.6	▲5.7	16,161	36.5	▲4.0
CDU	Klaus-Dieter Barbknecht	14,741	33.4	▲0.7	13,684	30.9	▼1.4
BSW	Ines Schwarze	3,873	8.8		4,976	11.2	
FW	Reiner Hentschel	2,904	6.6	▼1.4	1,370	3.1	▼2.1
SPD	Alexander Max Geißler	2,273	5.1	▼0.9	2,880	6.5	▼0.1
Left	Julia Richter	1,499	3.4	▼7.9	1,063	2.4	▼6.0
Greens	Johannes Brink	801	1.8	▼2.8	1,464	3.3	▼2.6
FDP	Tim Suttner	297	0.7	▼2.8	346	0.8	▼3.2
Freie Sachsen	M. Leuchtmann	258	0.6		1,067	2.4	
APT					373	0.8	
PARTEI					296	0.7	▼0.7
Values					121	0.3	
BD					112	0.3	
Pirates					103	0.2	
dieBasis					84	0.2	
Bündnis C					77	0.2	
ÖDP					36	0.1	
V-Partei3					32	0.1	
BüSo					22	0.0	
Informal votes		465			350		
Total valid votes		44,152			44,267		
Turnout		44,617	74.8	▲2.9			
AfD gain from CDU	Majority	2,765	6.2				

=== 2019 election ===
State election (2019): Mittelsachsen 1
Notes:	Blue background denotes the winner of the electorate vote. Pink background denotes a candidate elected from their party list. Yellow background denotes an electorate win by a list member, or other incumbent. A ✓ or ✗ denotes status of any incumbent, win or lose respectively.						
Party	Candidate	Votes	%	±%	Party votes	%	±%
CDU	Susan Leithoff	11,470	35.0	▼15.0	12,052	36.6	▼10.1
AfD		10,955	33.4		10,547	32.1	▲22.0
Left		3,064	9.3	▼10.9	2,821	8.6	▼8.9
FW		2,405	7.3		1,380	4.2	▲3.0
SPD		2,012	6.1	▼5.9	2,162	6.6	▼3.8
Greens		1,441	4.4	▲0.8	1,240	3.8	▲1.0
FDP		1,437	4.4	▼1.0	1,230	3.7	▼0.5
APT					406	1.2	▲0.4
PARTEI					296	0.9	▲0.6
NPD					193	0.6	▼4.2
Verjüngungsforschung					179	0.5	
The Blue Party					91	0.3	
ÖDP					70	0.2	
Awakening of German Patriots - Central Germany					63	0.2	
Pirates					54	0.2	▼0.5
PDV					41	0.1	
Humanists					33	0.1	
DKP					24	0.1	
BüSo					8	0.0	▼0.1
Informal votes		460			353		
Total valid votes		32,784			32,891		
Turnout		33,244	68.9	▲17.1			
CDU hold	Majority	515	1.6	▼28.2			

=== 2014 election ===
State election (2014): Mittelsachsen 1
Notes:	Blue background denotes the winner of the electorate vote. Pink background denotes a candidate elected from their party list. Yellow background denotes an electorate win by a list member, or other incumbent. A ✓ or ✗ denotes status of any incumbent, win or lose respectively.						
Party	Candidate	Votes	%	±%	Party votes	%	±%
CDU	Gernot Krasselt	12,917	50.0		12,186	46.7	
Left		5,208	20.2		4,568	17.5	
SPD		3,097	12.0		2,710	10.4	
AfD					2,626	10.1	
NPD		1,771	6.9		1,245	4.8	
FDP		1,390	5.4		1,105	4.2	
Greens		919	3.6		730	2.8	
FW					316	1.2	
APT					208	0.8	
Pirates		536	2.1		188	0.7	
PARTEI					84	0.3	
Pro Germany Citizens' Movement					55	0.2	
DSU					30	0.1	
BüSo					23	0.1	
Informal votes		589			353		
Total valid votes		25,838			26,074		
Turnout		26,427	51.8	▼14.6			
CDU win new seat	Majority	7,709	29.8				

== See also ==
- Politics of Saxony
- Landtag of Saxony
