= Chemnitz 1 =

State electoral district of Germany

9: Chemnitz 1
- Electoral district for the Landtag of Saxony
- Chemnitz 1 in 2024
- District: Chemnitz
- Electorate: 62,113 (2024)
- Major settlements: Part of the city of Chemnitz

Current electoral district
- Party: CDU
- Member: Peter Wilhelm Patt

Chemnitz 1 is an electoral constituency (German: Wahlkreis) represented in the Landtag of Saxony. It elects one member via first-past-the-post voting. Under the constituency numbering system, it is designated as constituency 9. It is within the district of Chemnitz.

== Geography ==
The constituency comprises the districts of Altendorf, Grüna, Hutholz, Kaßberg, Mittelbach, Morgenleite, Rabenstein, Reichenbrand, Röhrsdorf, Rottluff, Schloßchemnitz, Siegmar, and Stelzendorf within the city of Chemnitz.

There were 62,113 eligible voters in 2024.

== Members ==
| Election | Member | Party | % |
|---|---|---|---|
| 2014 | Peter Patt | CDU | 36.8 |
| 2019 | Peter Patt | CDU | 33.6 |
| 2024 | Peter Patt | CDU | 36.3 |

== Election results ==
=== 2024 election ===
State election (2024): Chemnitz 1
| Notes: | Blue background denotes the winner of the electorate vote. Pink background denotes a candidate elected from their party list. Yellow background denotes an electorate win by a list member, or other incumbent. A ✓ or ✗ denotes status of any incumbent, win or lose respectively. | | | | | | |
| Party | Candidate | Votes | % | ±% | Party votes | % | ±% |
|---|---|---|---|---|---|---|---|
| CDU | ✓ Peter Wilhelm Patt | 16,563 | 36.3 | ▲2.7 | 14,931 | 32.7 | ▼1.0 |
| AfD | Torsten Lars Franke | 12,754 | 28.0 | ▲4.6 | 11,042 | 24.2 | ▲2.0 |
| BSW | Peter Ronny Kupke | 5,633 | 12.4 | | 6,446 | 14.1 | |
| SPD | Renata Marwege | 3,282 | 7.2 | ▼1.3 | 4,165 | 9.1 | ▲0.6 |
| Greens | M. Volkmar Zschocke | 2,894 | 6.3 | ▼4.8 | 2,700 | 5.9 | ▼4.4 |
| Left | Nico Brünler | 2,421 | 5.3 | ▼8.0 | 2,398 | 5.2 | ▼7.3 |
| Freie Sachsen | | | | | 1,179 | 2.6 | |
| PARTEI | | | | | 632 | 1.4 | ▼0.9 |
| FW | Andreas-Stephan Wiech | 1,140 | 2.5 | ▼0.1 | 559 | 1.2 | ▼0.9 |
| APT | | | | | 545 | 1.2 | |
| FDP | Hai Dinh Bui | 590 | 1.3 | ▼2.7 | 439 | 1.0 | ▼3.2 |
| Independent | Daniel Richter | 310 | 0.7 | | | | |
| Values | | | | | 141 | 0.3 | |
| BD | | | | | 122 | 0.3 | |
| dieBasis | | | | | 96 | 0.2 | |
| Pirates | | | | | 96 | 0.2 | |
| V-Partei3 | | | | | 73 | 0.2 | |
| Bündnis C | | | | | 68 | 0.1 | |
| ÖDP | | | | | 47 | 0.1 | |
| BüSo | | | | | 23 | 0.1 | |
| Informal votes | | 342 | | | 227 | | |
| Total valid votes | | 45,587 | | | 45,702 | | |
| Turnout | | 45,929 | 73.9 | ▲5.5 | | | |
| CDU hold | Majority | 3,809 | 8.3 | | | | |

=== 2019 election ===
State election (2019): Chemnitz 1
| Notes: | Blue background denotes the winner of the electorate vote. Pink background denotes a candidate elected from their party list. Yellow background denotes an electorate win by a list member, or other incumbent. A ✓ or ✗ denotes status of any incumbent, win or lose respectively. | | | | | | |
| Party | Candidate | Votes | % | ±% | Party votes | % | ±% |
|---|---|---|---|---|---|---|---|
| CDU | ✓ Peter Patt | 14,502 | 33.6 | ▼3.2 | 14,535 | 33.6 | ▼2.9 |
| AfD | | 10,078 | 23.4 | | 9,567 | 22.1 | ▲13.4 |
| Left | | 5,749 | 13.3 | ▼11.1 | 5,433 | 12.6 | ▼9.5 |
| Greens | | 4,823 | 11.2 | ▲1.4 | 4,466 | 10.3 | ▲3.1 |
| SPD | | 3,652 | 8.5 | ▼7.3 | 3,700 | 8.6 | ▼5.1 |
| FDP | | 1,714 | 4.0 | ▼0.9 | 1,793 | 4.1 | ▲0.2 |
| PARTEI | | 1,257 | 2.9 | | 981 | 2.3 | ▲1.5 |
| FW | | 1,106 | 2.6 | | 917 | 2.1 | ▲1.4 |
| APT | | | | | 757 | 1.8 | ▲0.6 |
| Because I Can | | 229 | 0.5 | | | | |
| Verjüngungsforschung | | | | | 226 | 0.5 | |
| NPD | | | | | 167 | 0.4 | ▼3.0 |
| The Blue Party | | | | | 135 | 0.3 | |
| Pirates | | | | | 133 | 0.3 | ▼1.1 |
| Humanists | | | | | 109 | 0.3 | |
| ÖDP | | | | | 104 | 0.2 | |
| Awakening of German Patriots - Central Germany | | | | | 83 | 0.2 | |
| PDV | | | | | 43 | 0.1 | |
| DKP | | | | | 34 | 0.1 | |
| BüSo | | | | | 27 | 0.1 | ▼0.2 |
| Informal votes | | 420 | | | 320 | | |
| Total valid votes | | 43,110 | | | 43,210 | | |
| Turnout | | 43,530 | 67.4 | ▲19.9 | | | |
| CDU hold | Majority | 4,424 | 10.2 | ▼2.2 | | | |

=== 2014 election ===
State election (2014): Chemnitz 1
| Notes: | Blue background denotes the winner of the electorate vote. Pink background denotes a candidate elected from their party list. Yellow background denotes an electorate win by a list member, or other incumbent. A ✓ or ✗ denotes status of any incumbent, win or lose respectively. | | | | | | |
| Party | Candidate | Votes | % | ±% | Party votes | % | ±% |
|---|---|---|---|---|---|---|---|
| CDU | Peter Patt | 11,438 | 36.8 | | 11,341 | 36.3 | |
| Left | | 7,586 | 24.4 | | 6,890 | 22.1 | |
| SPD | | 4,907 | 15.8 | | 4,285 | 13.7 | |
| AfD | | | | | 2,716 | 8.7 | |
| Greens | | 3,037 | 9.8 | | 2,251 | 7.2 | |
| FDP | | 1,514 | 4.9 | | 1,203 | 3.9 | |
| NPD | | 1,419 | 4.6 | | 1,052 | 3.4 | |
| Pirates | | 751 | 2.4 | | 436 | 1.4 | |
| APT | | | | | 369 | 1.2 | |
| PARTEI | | | | | 254 | 0.8 | |
| FW | | | | | 234 | 0.7 | |
| BüSo | | 397 | 1.3 | | 81 | 0.3 | |
| Pro Germany Citizens' Movement | | | | | 77 | 0.2 | |
| DSU | | | | | 43 | 0.1 | |
| Informal votes | | 451 | | | 268 | | |
| Total valid votes | | 31,049 | | | 31,232 | | |
| Turnout | | 31,500 | 47.5 | ▼11.5 | | | |
| CDU win new seat | Majority | 3,852 | 12.4 | | | | |

== See also ==
- Politics of Saxony
- Landtag of Saxony
