= Leipzig 7 =

State electoral district of Germany

31: Leipzig 7
- Electoral district for the Landtag of Saxony
- Leipzig 7 in 2024
- District: Leipzig
- Electorate: 46,264 (2024)
- Major settlements: City-district Nordwest, Alt-West sub-districts of Böhlitz-Ehrenberg and Burghausen-Rückmarsdorf, and Mitte sub-district of Zentrum-Nordwest

Current electoral district
- Party: CDU
- Member: Rick Ulbricht

Leipzig 7 is an electoral constituency (German: Wahlkreis) represented in the Landtag of Saxony. It elects one member via first-past-the-post voting. Under the constituency numbering system, it is designated as constituency 31. It is within the city of Leipzig.

== Geography ==
The constituency comprises the district of Nordwest, the Alt-West sub-districts of Böhlitz-Ehrenberg and Burghausen-Rückmarsdorf, and the Mitte sub-district of Zentrum-Nordwest within the City of Leipzig.

There were 46,264 eligible voters in 2024.

== Members ==
Election	Member	Party	%
2014	Holger Gasse	CDU	32.8
2019	Holger Gasse	CDU	26.3
2024	Rick Ulbricht	CDU	34.3

== Election results ==
=== 2024 election ===
State election (2024): Leipzig 7
Notes:	Blue background denotes the winner of the electorate vote. Pink background denotes a candidate elected from their party list. Yellow background denotes an electorate win by a list member, or other incumbent. A ✓ or ✗ denotes status of any incumbent, win or lose respectively.						
Party	Candidate	Votes	%	±%	Party votes	%	±%
CDU	Rick Ulbricht	11,855	34.3	▲4.7	10,972	31.6	▲0.8
AfD	Tobias Keller	8,902	25.7	▲3.2	8,360	24.1	▲2.1
SPD	Michael Schmidt	3,616	10.5	▲1.2	3,750	10.8	▲1.3
BSW	Regina Kästner	3,301	9.5		3,743	10.8	
Greens	Stanislav Elinson	2,797	8.1	▼6.6	3,074	8.8	▼4.6
Left	Olga Naumov	2,509	7.3	▼6.4	2,110	6.1	▼4.4
FW	Thomas Weidinger	974	2.8	▼1.6	594	1.7	▼1.0
FDP	Alexander Gunkel	639	1.8	▼3.1	450	1.3	▼3.7
PARTEI					431	1.2	▼0.6
APT					404	1.1	
Freie Sachsen					372	1.1	
Pirates					94	0.3	
BD					89	0.3	
V-Partei3					80	0.2	
dieBasis					71	0.2	
Values					69	0.2	
ÖDP					41	0.1	
BüSo					28	0.1	
Bündnis C					27	0.1	
Informal votes		391			225		
Total valid votes		34,593			34,759		
Turnout		34,984	75.6	▲16.4			
CDU hold	Majority	2,953	8.6				

=== 2019 election ===
State election (2019): Leipzig 7
Notes:	Blue background denotes the winner of the electorate vote. Pink background denotes a candidate elected from their party list. Yellow background denotes an electorate win by a list member, or other incumbent. A ✓ or ✗ denotes status of any incumbent, win or lose respectively.						
Party	Candidate	Votes	%	±%	Party votes	%	±%
CDU	✓ Holger Gasse	9,363	26.3	▼6.5	9,264	26.0	▼7.1
AfD	Holger Hentschel	7,887	22.2	▲12.9	7,679	21.5	▲12.1
Left	Franz Sodann	7,667	21.5	▼4.6	6,165	17.3	▼5.3
Greens	Daniel Gerber	4,483	12.6	▲5.6	4,891	13.7	▲6.9
SPD	Michael Schmidt	3,084	8.7	▼5.3	3,107	8.7	▼5.5
FDP	Christof Kraus	1,082	3.0	▲0.4	1,214	3.4	▲0.4
PARTEI	Julius Gonsior	941	2.6		968	2.7	▲1.5
FW	Robert Baier	831	2.3	▲1.0	735	2.1	▲1.1
APT					680	1.9	▲0.4
Verjüngungsforschung					170	0.5	
We are from Leipzig	Ralf Detlef Kohl		159	0.4			
Pirates					155	0.4	▼1.2
NPD					134	0.4	▼4.7
ÖDP					108	0.3	
The Blue Party					105	0.3	
Humanists					101	0.3	
DKP					53	0.1	
Awakening of German Patriots - Central Germany					50	0.1	
BüSo	Jürgen Scharf	99	0.3	▼0.2	46	0.1	▼0.2
PDV					30	0.1	
Informal votes		364			305		
Total valid votes		35,596			35,655		
Turnout		35,960	59.3	▲20.9			
CDU hold	Majority	1,476	4.1	▼2.6			

=== 2014 election ===
State election (2014): Leipzig 7
Notes:	Blue background denotes the winner of the electorate vote. Pink background denotes a candidate elected from their party list. Yellow background denotes an electorate win by a list member, or other incumbent. A ✓ or ✗ denotes status of any incumbent, win or lose respectively.						
Party	Candidate	Votes	%	±%	Party votes	%	±%
CDU	Holger Gasse	7,172	32.8		7,252	33.1	
Left		5,700	26.1		4,949	22.6	
SPD		3,062	14.0		3,120	14.2	
AfD		2,032	9.3		2,053	9.4	
Greens		1,530	7.0		1,481	6.8	
NPD		930	4.3		1,113	5.1	
FDP		566	2.6		661	3.0	
Pirates		393	1.8		351	1.6	
APT					328	1.5	
PARTEI					266	1.2	
FW		289	1.3		211	1.0	
BüSo		105	0.5		70	0.3	
Freie Bürger Leipzig		77	0.4				
DSU					31	0.1	
Pro Germany Citizens' Movement					26	0.1	
Informal votes		292			236		
Total valid votes		21,856			21,912		
Turnout		22,148	38.4	▼11.3			
CDU win new seat	Majority	1,472	6.7				

== See also ==
- Politics of Saxony
- Landtag of Saxony
