= Dresden 3 =

State electoral district of Germany

42: Dresden 3
- Electoral district for the Landtag of Saxony
- Dresden 3 in 2024
- District: Dresden
- Electorate: 57,061 (2024)
- Major settlements: City-district Leuben, city-district Loschwitz (excluding the forest of Dresdner Heide), the village of Schönfeld-Weißig

Current electoral district
- Party: CDU
- Member: Christian Piwarz

Dresden 3 is an electoral constituency (German: Wahlkreis) represented in the Landtag of Saxony. It elects one member via first-past-the-post voting. Under the constituency numbering system, it is designated as constituency 42. It is within the city of Dresden.

== Geography ==
The constituency comprises the city-district of Leuben; city-district Loschwitz (excluding the forest of Dresdner Heide); and the village of Schönfeld-Weißig within the city of Dresden.

There were 57,061 eligible voters in 2024.

== Members ==
| Election | Member | Party | % |
|---|---|---|---|
| 2014 | Aline Fiedler | CDU | 31.7 |
| 2019 | Ingo Flemming | CDU | 30.3 |
| 2024 | Christian Piwarz | CDU | 42.0 |

== Election results ==
=== 2024 election ===
State election (2024): Dresden 3
| Notes: | Blue background denotes the winner of the electorate vote. Pink background denotes a candidate elected from their party list. Yellow background denotes an electorate win by a list member, or other incumbent. A ✓ or ✗ denotes status of any incumbent, win or lose respectively. | | | | | | |
| Party | Candidate | Votes | % | ±% | Party votes | % | ±% |
|---|---|---|---|---|---|---|---|
| CDU | Christian Piwarz | 18,872 | 42.0 | ▲7.6 | 16,099 | 35.6 | ▲3.7 |
| AfD | Joachim Keiler | 13,883 | 30.9 | ▲4.8 | 11,906 | 26.3 | ▲2.1 |
| BSW | | | | | 4,771 | 10.5 | |
| SPD | Kristin Sturm | 3,125 | 7.0 | ▼0.5 | 3,966 | 8.8 | ▲0.9 |
| Greens | Andrea Mühle | 3,038 | 6.8 | ▼7.7 | 3,530 | 7.8 | ▼4.9 |
| Left | Grit Alliger | 2,054 | 4.6 | ▼5.1 | 1,343 | 3.0 | ▼5.2 |
| Independent | Robert Reschke | 1,709 | 3.8 | | | | |
| FW | Samit Köckritz | 955 | 2.1 | | 506 | 1.1 | ▼2.0 |
| FDP | Robert Malorny | 932 | 2.1 | ▼5.5 | 588 | 1.3 | ▼5.9 |
| Freie Sachsen | Jens Lorek | 350 | 0.8 | | 1,057 | 2.3 | |
| APT | | | | | 389 | 0.9 | |
| PARTEI | | | | | 347 | 0.8 | ▼0.6 |
| Values | | | | | 144 | 0.3 | |
| BD | | | | | 139 | 0.3 | |
| dieBasis | | | | | 134 | 0.3 | |
| Pirates | | | | | 134 | 0.3 | |
| V-Partei3 | | | | | 79 | 0.2 | |
| ÖDP | | | | | 42 | 0.1 | |
| Bündnis C | | | | | 37 | 0.1 | |
| BüSo | | | | | 27 | 0.1 | |
| Informal votes | | 619 | | | 299 | | |
| Total valid votes | | 44,918 | | | 45,238 | | |
| Turnout | | 45,537 | 79.8 | ▲4.0 | | | |
| CDU hold | Majority | 4,989 | 11.1 | | | | |

=== 2019 election ===
State election (2019): Dresden 3
| Notes: | Blue background denotes the winner of the electorate vote. Pink background denotes a candidate elected from their party list. Yellow background denotes an electorate win by a list member, or other incumbent. A ✓ or ✗ denotes status of any incumbent, win or lose respectively. | | | | | | |
| Party | Candidate | Votes | % | ±% | Party votes | % | ±% |
|---|---|---|---|---|---|---|---|
| CDU | Ingo Flemming | 13,873 | 30.3 | ▼1.4 | 13,086 | 28.4 | ▼6.9 |
| AfD | Thomas Ladzinski | 10,484 | 22.9 | ▲14.6 | 9,627 | 20.9 | ▲12.6 |
| Greens | Henriette Mehn | 6,354 | 13.9 | ▲4.3 | 7,159 | 15.5 | ▲5.8 |
| Left | Anne Holowenko | 6,030 | 13.2 | ▼5.6 | 4,807 | 10.4 | ▼8.2 |
| SPD | Albrecht Pallas | 5,300 | 11.6 | ▼5.7 | 4,113 | 8.9 | ▼5.9 |
| FDP | Thomas Kunz | 2,466 | 5.4 | ▼1.1 | 3,179 | 6.9 | ▲2.8 |
| FW | | | | | 1,360 | 3.0 | ▲1.8 |
| PARTEI | Philipp Hencker | 1,335 | 2.9 | | 920 | 2.0 | ▲0.6 |
| APT | | | | | 511 | 1.1 | Steady |
| Humanists | | | | | 218 | 0.5 | |
| Pirates | | | | | 217 | 0.5 | ▼1.6 |
| ÖDP | | | | | 210 | 0.5 | |
| Verjüngungsforschung | | | | | 180 | 0.4 | |
| NPD | | | | | 144 | 0.3 | ▼2.7 |
| The Blue Party | | | | | 140 | 0.3 | |
| PDV | | | | | 48 | 0.1 | |
| Awakening of German Patriots - Central Germany | | | | | 45 | 0.1 | |
| BüSo | | | | | 39 | 0.1 | ▼0.1 |
| DKP | | | | | 39 | 0.1 | |
| Informal votes | | 504 | | | 304 | | |
| Total valid votes | | 45,842 | | | 46,042 | | |
| Turnout | | 46,346 | 74.8 | ▲14.2 | | | |
| CDU hold | Majority | 3,389 | 7.4 | ▼15.5 | | | |

=== 2014 election ===
State election (2014): Dresden 3
| Notes: | Blue background denotes the winner of the electorate vote. Pink background denotes a candidate elected from their party list. Yellow background denotes an electorate win by a list member, or other incumbent. A ✓ or ✗ denotes status of any incumbent, win or lose respectively. | | | | | | |
| Party | Candidate | Votes | % | ±% | Party votes | % | ±% |
|---|---|---|---|---|---|---|---|
| CDU | Aline Fiedler | 12,111 | 31.7 | | 13,559 | 35.3 | |
| Left | | 7,200 | 18.8 | | 7,153 | 18.6 | |
| SPD | | 6,621 | 17.3 | | 5,669 | 14.8 | |
| Greens | | 3,689 | 9.6 | | 3,711 | 9.7 | |
| AfD | | 3,173 | 8.3 | | 3,199 | 8.3 | |
| FDP | | 2,475 | 6.5 | | 1,566 | 4.1 | |
| Pirates | | 1,059 | 2.8 | | 799 | 2.1 | |
| NPD | | 999 | 2.6 | | 1,160 | 3.0 | |
| PARTEI | | | | | 556 | 1.4 | |
| FW | | 663 | 1.7 | | 478 | 1.2 | |
| APT | | | | | 414 | 1.1 | |
| Independent | WV MFU | 141 | 0.4 | | | | |
| BüSo | | 122 | 0.3 | | 66 | 0.2 | |
| Pro Germany Citizens' Movement | | | | | 51 | 0.1 | |
| DSU | | | | | 44 | 0.1 | |
| Informal votes | | 493 | | | 321 | | |
| Total valid votes | | 38,253 | | | 38,425 | | |
| Turnout | | 38,746 | 60.6 | ▲0.6 | | | |
| CDU win new seat | Majority | 4,911 | 22.9 | | | | |

== See also ==
- Politics of Saxony
- Landtag of Saxony
