= Chemnitz 2 =

State electoral district of Germany

10: Chemnitz 2
- Electoral district for the Landtag of Saxony
- Chemnitz 2 in 2024
- District: Chemnitz
- Electorate: 61,172 (2024)
- Major settlements: Part of the city of Chemnitz

Current electoral district
- Party: CDU
- Member: Alexander Dierks

Chemnitz 2 is an electoral constituency (German: Wahlkreis) represented in the Landtag of Saxony. It elects one member via first-past-the-post voting. Under the constituency numbering system, it is designated as constituency 10. It is within the district of Chemnitz.

== Geography ==
The constituency comprises the districts of Borna-Heinersdorf, Ebersdorf, Furth, Gablenz, Glösa-Draisdorf, Hilbersdorf, Lutherviertel, Sonnenberg, Wittgensdorf, Yorckgebiet, and Zentrum within the city of Chemnitz.

There were 61,172 eligible voters in 2024.

== Members ==
Election	Member	Party	%
2014	Alexander Dierks	CDU	32.4
2019	Alexander Dierks	CDU	29.8
2024	Alexander Dierks	CDU	36.7

== Election results ==
=== 2024 election ===
State election (2024): Chemnitz 2
Notes:	Blue background denotes the winner of the electorate vote. Pink background denotes a candidate elected from their party list. Yellow background denotes an electorate win by a list member, or other incumbent. A ✓ or ✗ denotes status of any incumbent, win or lose respectively.						
Party	Candidate	Votes	%	±%	Party votes	%	±%
CDU	✓ Alexander Dierks	15,594	36.7	▲6.9	12,737	29.7	▼0.8
AfD	Volker Götz Dringenberg	14,349	33.8	▲7.3	11,664	27.2	▲1.0
BSW					6,472	15.1	
Left	Susanne Schaper	5,392	12.7	▼6.3	2,342	5.5	▼8.5
SPD	Sandra Göbel	2,936	6.9	▼0.3	3,537	8.2	▼0.1
Greens	Sascha Thümmler	1,603	3.8	▼5.2	2,166	5.1	▼3.4
FW	Oliver Wölfert	1,270	3.0	▼0.6	434	1.0	▼1.0
FDP	Norma Grube	901	2.1	▼1.3	461	1.1	▼2.5
Freie Sachsen	Robert Andres	412	1.0		1,330	3.1	
APT					515	1.2	
PARTEI					494	1.2	▼1.2
BD					141	0.3	
Values					135	0.3	
dieBasis					102	0.2	
Pirates					101	0.2	
Bündnis C					92	0.2	
V-Partei3					78	0.2	
ÖDP					44	0.1	
BüSo					31	0.1	
Informal votes		737			318		
Total valid votes		42,457			42,876		
Turnout		43,194	70.6	▲4.1			
CDU hold	Majority	1,245	2.9				

=== 2019 election ===
State election (2019): Chemnitz 2
Notes:	Blue background denotes the winner of the electorate vote. Pink background denotes a candidate elected from their party list. Yellow background denotes an electorate win by a list member, or other incumbent. A ✓ or ✗ denotes status of any incumbent, win or lose respectively.						
Party	Candidate	Votes	%	±%	Party votes	%	±%
CDU	✓ Alexander Dierks	12,222	29.8	▼2.6	12,549	30.5	▼2.9
AfD		10,880	26.5		10,778	26.2	▲16.6
Left		7,791	19.0	▼11.0	5,754	14.0	▼11.0
Greens		3,700	9.0	▲1.9	3,474	8.4	▲2.5
SPD		2,954	7.2	▼8.2	3,445	8.4	▼5.3
FW		1,458	3.6		826	2.0	▲1.2
FDP		1,423	3.5	▼2.0	1,476	3.6	▲0.1
PARTEI					971	2.4	▲1.6
APT					726	1.8	▲0.7
Citizens' Movement Pro Chemnitz		578	1.4				
Verjüngungsforschung					262	0.6	
NPD					182	0.4	▼3.9
Pirates					157	0.4	▼1.0
Humanists					136	0.3	
The Blue Party					124	0.3	
Awakening of German Patriots - Central Germany					92	0.2	
ÖDP					83	0.2	
PDV					55	0.1	
BüSo					32	0.1	▼0.1
DKP					30	0.1	
Informal votes		487			341		
Total valid votes		41,006			41,152		
Turnout		41,493	64.0	19.6			
CDU hold	Majority	1,342	3.3	▲0.9			

=== 2014 election ===
State election (2014): Chemnitz 2
Notes:	Blue background denotes the winner of the electorate vote. Pink background denotes a candidate elected from their party list. Yellow background denotes an electorate win by a list member, or other incumbent. A ✓ or ✗ denotes status of any incumbent, win or lose respectively.						
Party	Candidate	Votes	%	±%	Party votes	%	±%
CDU	Alexander Dierks	9,494	32.4		9,876	33.4	
Left		8,783	30.0		7,393	25.0	
SPD		4,499	15.4		4,042	13.7	
AfD					2,841	9.6	
Greens		2,070	7.1		1,737	5.9	
NPD		1,845	6.3		1,256	4.3	
FDP		1,599	5.5		1,033	3.5	
Pirates		749	2.6		409	1.4	
APT					321	1.1	
FW					228	0.8	
PARTEI					226	0.8	
Pro Germany Citizens' Movement					93	0.3	
BüSo		269	0.9		51	0.2	
DSU					32	0.1	
Informal votes		522			292		
Total valid votes		29,308			29,538		
Turnout		29,830	44.4	▼13.8			
CDU win new seat	Majority	711	2.4				

== See also ==
- Politics of Saxony
- Landtag of Saxony
