= Erzgebirge 2 =

State electoral district of Germany

13: Erzgebirge 2
- Electoral district for the Landtag of Saxony
- Erzgebirge 2 in 2024
- District: Erzgebirgskreis
- Electorate: 44,807 (2024)
- Major settlements: Aue-Bad Schlema, Eibenstock, and Schneeberg

Current electoral district
- Party: AfD
- Member: Peter Bachmann

Erzgebirge 2 is an electoral constituency (German: Wahlkreis) represented in the Landtag of Saxony. It elects one member via first-past-the-post voting. Under the constituency numbering system, it is designated as constituency 13. It is within the district of Erzgebirgskreis.

== Geography ==
The constituency comprises the towns of Aue-Bad Schlema, Eibenstock, and Schneeberg, and the districts of Bockau, Schönheide, Stützengrün, and Zschorlau within Erzgebirgskreis.

There were 44,807 eligible voters in 2024.

== Members ==
Election	Member	Party	%
2014	Thomas Colditz	CDU	47.8
2019	Eric Dietrich	CDU	37.6
2024	Peter Bachmann	AfD	38.0

== Election results ==
=== 2024 election ===
State election (2024): Erzgebirge 2
Notes:	Blue background denotes the winner of the electorate vote. Pink background denotes a candidate elected from their party list. Yellow background denotes an electorate win by a list member, or other incumbent. A ✓ or ✗ denotes status of any incumbent, win or lose respectively.						
Party	Candidate	Votes	%	±%	Party votes	%	±%
AfD	Peter Bachmann	12,415	38.0	▲6.7	11,300	34.5	▲5.2
CDU	✗ Eric Dietrich	11,901	36.4	▼1.3	11,281	34.4	▼3.2
BSW	Wolfram Christ	3,073	9.4		3,988	12.2	
FW	Danny Weber	2,104	6.4	▲1.2	1,038	3.2	▼0.9
Left	Rico Gebhardt	1,110	3.4	▼9.4	625	1.9	▼7.3
SPD	Sören Wittig	913	2.8	▼3.8	1,341	4.1	▼3.3
Freie Sachsen	Stefan Hartung	741	2.3		1,587	4.8	
Greens	Uwe Stieven Kaettniß	260	0.8	▼2.1	338	1.0	▼2.0
APT					286	0.9	
Values					239	0.7	
Bündnis C					221	0.7	
FDP	Steve Peter	193	0.6	▼2.9	171	0.5	▼2.6
PARTEI					146	0.4	▼0.5
BD					82	0.3	
Pirates					50	0.2	
dieBasis					30	0.1	
BüSo					24	0.1	
ÖDP					19	0.1	
V-Partei3					17	0.1	
Informal votes		426			353		
Total valid votes		32,710			32,783		
Turnout		33,136	74.0	▲9.3			
AfD gain from CDU	Majority	514	1.6				

=== 2019 election ===
State election (2019): Erzgebirge 2
Notes:	Blue background denotes the winner of the electorate vote. Pink background denotes a candidate elected from their party list. Yellow background denotes an electorate win by a list member, or other incumbent. A ✓ or ✗ denotes status of any incumbent, win or lose respectively.						
Party	Candidate	Votes	%	±%	Party votes	%	±%
CDU	Eric Dietrich	11,229	37.6	▼10.2	11,276	37.6	▼6.1
AfD		9,334	31.3	▲22.1	8,775	29.3	▲18.7
Left		3,828	12.8	▼5.5	2,765	9.2	▼9.8
SPD		1,967	6.6	▼4.0	2,211	7.4	▼2.8
FW		1,569	5.3	▲2.2	1,206	4.0	▲1.9
FDP		1,050	3.5	▲1.0	938	3.1	Steady
Greens		860	2.9	▲0.7	921	3.1	▲0.7
NPD					621	2.1	▼4.8
APT					433	1.4	▲0.5
PARTEI					276	0.9	▲0.6
Verjüngungsforschung					157	0.5	
The Blue Party					122	0.4	
ÖDP					67	0.2	
Pirates					55	0.2	▼0.3
Awakening of German Patriots - Central Germany					53	0.2	
Humanists					40	0.1	
PDV					28	0.1	
BüSo					15	0.1	Steady
DKP					13	0.0	
Informal votes		480			345		
Total valid votes		29,837			29,972		
Turnout		30,317	63.7	▲15.6			
CDU hold	Majority	1,895	6.3	▼23.2			

=== 2014 election ===
State election (2014): Erzgebirge 2
Notes:	Blue background denotes the winner of the electorate vote. Pink background denotes a candidate elected from their party list. Yellow background denotes an electorate win by a list member, or other incumbent. A ✓ or ✗ denotes status of any incumbent, win or lose respectively.						
Party	Candidate	Votes	%	±%	Party votes	%	±%
CDU	Thomas Colditz	11,512	47.8		10,528	43.7	
Left		4,396	18.3		4,568	19.0	
SPD		2,545	10.6		2,457	10.2	
AfD		2,215	9.2		2,552	10.6	
NPD		1,407	5.8		1,672	6.9	
FW		740	3.1		512	2.1	
FDP		590	2.5		749	3.1	
Greens		530	2.2		571	2.4	
APT					206	0.9	
Pirates		142	0.6		129	0.5	
PARTEI					66	0.3	
Pro Germany Citizens' Movement					40	0.2	
BüSo					26	0.1	
DSU					15	0.1	
Informal votes		351			337		
Total valid votes		24,077			24,091		
Turnout		24,428	48.1	▼11.0			
CDU win new seat	Majority	7,116	29.5				

== See also ==
- Politics of Saxony
- Landtag of Saxony
