= Görlitz 4 =

State electoral district of Germany

60: Görlitz 4
- Electoral district for the Landtag of Saxony
- Görlitz 4 in 2024
- District: Görlitz
- Electorate: 45,313 (2024)
- Major settlements: Seifhennersdorf and Zittau

Current electoral district
- Party: AfD
- Member: Hajo Exner

Görlitz 4 is an electoral constituency (German: Wahlkreis) represented in the Landtag of Saxony. It elects one member via first-past-the-post voting. Under the constituency numbering system, it is designated as constituency 60. It is within the district of Görlitz.

== Geography ==
The constituency comprises the towns of Seifhennersdorf and Zittau, and the municipalities of Bertsdorf-Hörnitz, Großschönau, Hainewalde, Jonsdorf, Leutersdorf, Mittelherwigsdorf, Oderwitz, Olbersdorf, and Oybin within the district of Görlitz.

There were 45,313 eligible voters in 2024.

== Members ==
Election	Member	Party	%
2014	Stephan Meyer	CDU	41.0
2019	Stephan Meyer	CDU	43.3
2024	Hajo Exner	AfD	38.4

== Election results ==
=== 2024 election ===
State election (2024): Görlitz 4
Notes:	Blue background denotes the winner of the electorate vote. Pink background denotes a candidate elected from their party list. Yellow background denotes an electorate win by a list member, or other incumbent. A ✓ or ✗ denotes status of any incumbent, win or lose respectively.						
Party	Candidate	Votes	%	±%	Party votes	%	±%
AfD	Hajo Exner	12,382	38.4	▲4.4	12,034	37.2	▲4.6
CDU	Thomas Erich Krusekopf	11,270	34.9	▼8.3	11,344	35.1	▼1.8
BSW	Andreas Manfred Herrmann	3,126	9.7		3,558	11.0	
FW	Rico Hertrampf	1,131	3.5		545	1.7	▼1.1
FDP	Michel Kretschmer	954	3.0	▼1.6	286	0.9	▼2.8
SPD	Ralf Hofmann	897	2.8	▼1.2	1,231	3.8	▼1.5
Left	Susanne Kapron	885	2.7	▼6.6	691	2.1	▼6.0
Greens	Steve Grundig	596	1.9	▼3.0	763	2.4	▼2.5
Freie Sachsen					747	2.3	
Independent	Frank Gottfried Ebermann	564	1.7				
APT					417	1.3	
PARTEI					188	0.6	▼0.7
Values					128	0.4	
BD	K. Reepen	286	0.9		113	0.3	
dieBasis	Niels Reszies	159	0.5		109	0.3	
Pirates					63	0.2	
Bündnis C					42	0.1	
V-Partei3					38	0.1	
ÖDP					17	0.1	
BüSo					16	0.0	
Informal votes		409			329		
Total valid votes		32,250			32,330		
Turnout		32,659	72.1	▲3.4			
AfD gain from CDU	Majority	1,112	3.5				

=== 2019 election ===
State election (2019): Görlitz 4
Notes:	Blue background denotes the winner of the electorate vote. Pink background denotes a candidate elected from their party list. Yellow background denotes an electorate win by a list member, or other incumbent. A ✓ or ✗ denotes status of any incumbent, win or lose respectively.						
Party	Candidate	Votes	%	±%	Party votes	%	±%
CDU	✓ Stephan Meyer	13,456	43.3	▲2.3	11,526	36.9	▼0.9
AfD	Christian Siegert	10,581	34.0	▲21.6	10,177	32.6	▲19.9
Left	Tuomo Neumann	2,922	9.4	▼8.6	2,555	8.2	▼9.9
Greens	Marie Mühlich	1,493	4.8	▲0.1	1,531	4.9	▲0.5
FDP	Hans Grüner	1,403	4.5	▲0.9	1,157	3.7	▼0.5
SPD	Andreas Herrmann	1,254	4.0	▼5.4	1,672	5.4	▼5.5
FW					867	2.8	▼0.1
APT					556	1.8	▲0.6
PARTEI					390	1.2	▲0.8
NPD					189	0.6	▼5.2
Verjüngungsforschung					150	0.5	
The Blue Party					125	0.4	
ÖDP					76	0.2	
Pirates					69	0.2	▼0.6
DKP					45	0.1	
Awakening of German Patriots - Central Germany					35	0.1	
Humanists					31	0.1	
PDV					30	0.1	
BüSo					27	0.1	▼0.1
Informal votes		465			366		
Total valid votes		31,109			31,20		
Turnout		31,574	65.1	▲16.5			
CDU hold	Majority	2,875	9.3	▼13.7			

=== 2014 election ===
State election (2014): Görlitz 4
Notes:	Blue background denotes the winner of the electorate vote. Pink background denotes a candidate elected from their party list. Yellow background denotes an electorate win by a list member, or other incumbent. A ✓ or ✗ denotes status of any incumbent, win or lose respectively.						
Party	Candidate	Votes	%	±%	Party votes	%	±%
CDU	Stephan Meyer	10,012	41.0		9,279	37.8	
Left		4,400	18.0		4,445	18.1	
AfD		3,028	12.4		3,125	12.7	
SPD		2,303	9.4		2,678	10.9	
NPD		1,336	5.5		1,423	5.8	
Greens		1,141	4.7		1,068	4.4	
FW		1,053	4.3		715	2.9	
FDP		874	3.6		1,039	4.2	
APT					305	1.2	
Pirates		254	1.0		198	0.8	
PARTEI					109	0.4	
Pro Germany Citizens' Movement					73	0.3	
DSU					46	0.2	
BüSo					40	0.2	
Informal votes		702			560		
Total valid votes		24,401			24,543		
Turnout		25,103	48.6	▼2.1			
CDU win new seat	Majority	5,612	23.0				

== See also ==
- Politics of Saxony
- Landtag of Saxony
