= Dresden 1 =

State electoral district of Germany

40: Dresden 1
- Electoral district for the Landtag of Saxony
- Dresden 1 in 2024
- District: Dresden
- Electorate: 47,614 (2024)
- Major settlements: City-district Klotzsche, the forest of Dresdner Heide from the city-district Loschwitz, sub-districts Kaditz, Mickten, and Trachau of city-district Pieschen; and the villages of Langebrück, Schönborn, and Weixdorf

Current electoral district
- Party: CDU
- Member: Christian Hartmann

Dresden 1 is an electoral constituency (German: Wahlkreis) represented in the Landtag of Saxony. It elects one member via first-past-the-post voting. Under the constituency numbering system, it is designated as constituency 40. It is within the city of Dresden.

== Geography ==
The constituency comprises the city-district of Klotzsche; the forest of Dresdner Heide from the city-district of Loschwitz, the sub-districts of Kaditz, Mickten, and Trachau of the district of Pieschen; and the villages of Langebrück, Schönborn, and Weixdorf within the city of Dresden.

There were 47,614 eligible voters in 2024.

== Members ==
Election	Member	Party	%
2014	Christian Hartmann	CDU	33.4
2019	Christian Hartmann	CDU	28.7
2024	Christian Hartmann	CDU	40.8

== Election results ==
=== 2024 election ===
State election (2024): Dresden 1
Notes:	Blue background denotes the winner of the electorate vote. Pink background denotes a candidate elected from their party list. Yellow background denotes an electorate win by a list member, or other incumbent. A ✓ or ✗ denotes status of any incumbent, win or lose respectively.						
Party	Candidate	Votes	%	±%	Party votes	%	±%
CDU	✓ Christian Hartmann	15,294	40.9	▲8.0	12,626	33.5	▲5.5
AfD	Hans-Jürgen Zickler	10,799	28.9	▲3.9	9,394	24.9	▲1.5
BSW					3,903	10.4	
Greens	Ulrike Caspary	3,826	10.2	▼3.2	3,226	8.6	▼3.9
SPD	Editha Matthes	2,596	6.9	▼0.3	3,628	9.6	▲2.0
Left	Paul Senf	2,399	6.4	▼4.1	1,500	4.0	▼5.3
FW	Theodor Benad	920	2.5		486	1/3	▼1.6
FDP	Andreas Mogwitz	825	2.2	▼5.3	462	1.2	▼9.3
Freie Sachsen	Dietmar Grahl	524	1.4		894	2.4	
PARTEI					390	1.0	▼0.9
APT					354	0.9	
Pirates					257	0.7	
BD					138	0.4	
dieBasis					118	0.3	
V-Partei3					83	0.2	
Values					79	0.2	
BüSo	Michael Gründler	233	0.6		65	0.2	
ÖDP					39	0.1	
Bündnis C					27	0.1	
Informal votes		545			292		
Total valid votes		37,416			37,669		
Turnout		37,961	79.7	▲8.3			
CDU hold	Majority	4,495	12.0				

=== 2019 election ===
State election (2019): Dresden 1
Notes:	Blue background denotes the winner of the electorate vote. Pink background denotes a candidate elected from their party list. Yellow background denotes an electorate win by a list member, or other incumbent. A ✓ or ✗ denotes status of any incumbent, win or lose respectively.						
Party	Candidate	Votes	%	±%	Party votes	%	±%
CDU	✓ Christian Hartmann	12,623	28.7	▼4.7	11,050	25.0	▼7.6
Greens	Valentin Lippmann	9,957	22.6	▲7.4	9,430	21.3	▲6.3
AfD	Karin Wilke	8,293	18.8	▲11.7	7,835	17.7	▲10.3
Left	Sarah Buddeberg	5,539	12.6	▼5.4	4,961	11.2	▼6.7
SPD	Emiliano Chaimite	3,439	7.8	▼6.4	3,460	7.8	▼5.3
FDP	Torsten Günther	2,776	6.3	▲3.2	4,093	9.3	▲5.3
PARTEI	Sören Hinze	1,390	3.2	▲0.9	992	2.2	▲0.4
FW					900	2.0	▼0.1
APT					443	1.0	▼0.3
Pirates					239	0.5	▼1.6
ÖDP					156	0.4	
Humanists					142	0.3	
Verjüngungsforschung					126	0.3	
NPD					121	0.3	▼2.5
The Blue Party					107	0.2	
Awakening of German Patriots - Central Germany					48	0.1	
DKP					39	0.1	
PDV					36	0.1	
BüSo					24	0.1	▼0.2
Informal votes		425			240		
Total valid votes		44,017			44,202		
Turnout		44,442	78.1	▲15.9			
CDU hold	Majority	2,666	6.1	▼9.3			

=== 2014 election ===
State election (2014): Dresden 1
Notes:	Blue background denotes the winner of the electorate vote. Pink background denotes a candidate elected from their party list. Yellow background denotes an electorate win by a list member, or other incumbent. A ✓ or ✗ denotes status of any incumbent, win or lose respectively.						
Party	Candidate	Votes	%	±%	Party votes	%	±%
CDU	Christian Hartmann	11,582	33.4		11,347	32.6	
Left		6,225	18.0		6,206	17.9	
Greens		5,264	15.2		5,199	15.0	
SPD		4,928	14.2		4,564	13.1	
AfD		2,470	7.1		2,574	7.4	
FDP		1,061	3.1		1,377	4.0	
PARTEI		798	2.3		622	1.8	
NPD		778	2.2		968	2.8	
Pirates		769	2.2		742	2.1	
FW		633	1.8		499	1.4	
APT					468	1.3	
BüSo		125	0.4		101	0.3	
DSU					47	0.1	
Pro Germany Citizens' Movement					45	0.1	
Informal votes		415			289		
Total valid votes		34,633			34,759		
Turnout		35,048	62.2	▲1.1			
CDU win new seat	Majority	5,357	15.4				

== See also ==
- Politics of Saxony
- Landtag of Saxony
