= Sächsische Schweiz-Osterzgebirge 1 =

State electoral district of Germany

48: Sächsische Schweiz-Osterzgebirge 1
- Electoral district for the Landtag of Saxony
- Sächsische Schweiz-Osterzgebirge 1 in 2024
- District: Sächsische Schweiz-Osterzgebirge
- Electorate: 47,874 (2024)
- Major settlements: Freital, Tharandt, and Wilsdruff

Current electoral district
- Party: AfD
- Member: Norbert Mayer

Sächsische Schweiz-Osterzgebirge 1 is an electoral constituency (German: Wahlkreis) represented in the Landtag of Saxony. It elects one member via first-past-the-post voting. Under the constituency numbering system, it is designated as constituency 48. It is within the district of Sächsische Schweiz-Osterzgebirge.

== Geography ==
The constituency comprises the towns of Freital, Tharandt, and Wilsdruff, and the municipality of Dorfhain within the district of Sächsische Schweiz-Osterzgebirge.

There were 47,874 eligible voters in 2024.

== Members ==
Election	Member	Party	%
2014	Roland Wöller	CDU	45.1
2019	Roland Wöller	CDU	38.8
2024	Norbert Mayer	AfD	38.8

== Election results ==
=== 2024 election ===
State election (2024): Sächsische Schweiz-sterzgebirge 1
Notes:	Blue background denotes the winner of the electorate vote. Pink background denotes a candidate elected from their party list. Yellow background denotes an electorate win by a list member, or other incumbent. A ✓ or ✗ denotes status of any incumbent, win or lose respectively.						
Party	Candidate	Votes	%	±%	Party votes	%	±%
AfD	Norbert Mayer	13,809	38.8	▲8.6	12,841	36.0	▲3.8
CDU	Christian Fischer	12,403	34.9	▼3.9	11,661	32.7	▼0.3
BSW	Lars Wurzler	3,314	9.3		3,974	11.1	
FW	Alexander Frenzel	2,187	6.2	▼2.0	948	2.7	▼2.7
SPD	Daniel Siegel	1,373	3.9	▼0.6	1,971	5.5	▼0.7
Greens	Ines Kummer	901	2.5	▼2.9	1,050	2.9	▼3.1
Left	Jörg Mumme	863	2.4	▼5.7	751	2.1	▼4.9
FDP	Cornelia Knauth	354	1.0	▼3.5	290	0.8	▼4.1
Freie Sachsen	A. Dieter Hofmann	344	1.0		1,042	2.9	
APT					382	1.1	
PARTEI					214	0.5	▼0.5
BD					134	0.4	
Pirates					88	0.2	
Values					84	0.2	
dieBasis					82	0.2	
V-Partei3					45	0.1	
ÖDP					33	0.1	
Bündnis C					32	0.1	
BüSo					23	0.1	
Informal votes		369			272		
Total valid votes		35,548			35,645		
Turnout		35,917	75.0	▲8.4			
AfD gain from CDU	Majority	1,406	3.9				

=== 2019 election ===
State election (2019): Sächsische Schweiz-Osterzgebirge 1
Notes:	Blue background denotes the winner of the electorate vote. Pink background denotes a candidate elected from their party list. Yellow background denotes an electorate win by a list member, or other incumbent. A ✓ or ✗ denotes status of any incumbent, win or lose respectively.						
Party	Candidate	Votes	%	±%	Party votes	%	±%
CDU	✓ Roland Wöller	12,713	38.8	▼6.3	10,827	33.0	▼9.1
AfD	Norbert Mayer	9,901	30.2	▲18.9	10,590	32.3	▲20.8
Left	Uta-Verena Meiwald	2,678	8.2	▼8.0	2,307	7.0	▼8.3
FW	Andreas Hofmann	2,670	8.2	▲4.3	1,745	5.3	▲2.5
Greens	Ines Kummer	1,776	5.4	▲0.7	2,001	6.1	▲1.5
FDP	Lothar Brandau	1,484	4.5	▲1.7	1,605	4.9	▲1.0
SPD	Daniela Forberg	1,454	4.4	▼5.7	2,050	6.2	▼4.9
APT					488	1.5	▲0.4
PARTEI					356	1.1	▲0.6
Verjüngungsforschung					193	0.6	
The Blue Party					123	0.4	
NPD					143	0.4	▼5.3
ÖDP					96	0.3	
Pirates					96	0.3	▼0.5
V-Partei3	Martina Hanke	81	0.2				
Humanists					64	0.2	
Awakening of German Patriots - Central Germany					61	0.2	
PDV					31	0.1	
BüSo					27	0.1	▼0.2
DKP					24	0.1	
Informal votes		368			298		
Total valid votes		32,757			32,827		
Turnout		33,125	67.9	▲16.3			
CDU hold	Majority	2,812	8.6	▼20.3			

=== 2014 election ===
State election (2014): Sächsische Schweiz-Osterzgebirge 1
Notes:	Blue background denotes the winner of the electorate vote. Pink background denotes a candidate elected from their party list. Yellow background denotes an electorate win by a list member, or other incumbent. A ✓ or ✗ denotes status of any incumbent, win or lose respectively.						
Party	Candidate	Votes	%	±%	Party votes	%	±%
CDU	Roland Wöller	11,292	45.1		10,566	42.1	
Left		4,069	16.2		3,850	15.3	
AfD		2,839	11.3		2,895	11.5	
SPD		2,535	10.1		2,780	11.1	
Greens		1,178	4.7		1,160	4.6	
NPD		1,126	4.5		1,423	5.7	
FW		981	3.9		714	2.8	
FDP		691	2.8		981	3.9	
APT					268	1.1	
Pirates		243	1.0		199	0.8	
PARTEI					121	0.5	
BüSo		100	0.4		70	0.3	
Pro Germany Citizens' Movement					51	0.2	
DSU					35	0.1	
Informal votes		385			326		
Total valid votes		25,054			25,113		
Turnout		25,439	51.6	▼2.6			
CDU win new seat	Majority	7,223	28.9				

== See also ==
- Politics of Saxony
- Landtag of Saxony
