= Leipzig 8 =

State electoral district of Germany

32: Leipzig 8
- Electoral district for the Landtag of Saxony
- Leipzig 8 in 2024
- District: Leipzig
- Electorate: 61,649 (2024)
- Major settlements: City-district Nordeast, sub-districts Volkmarsdorf and Anger-Crottendorf (East), and sub-districts of Seehausen and Wiederitzsch (North)

Current electoral district
- Party: CDU
- Member: Holger Gasse

Leipzig 8 is an electoral constituency (German: Wahlkreis) represented in the Landtag of Saxony. It elects one member via first-past-the-post voting. Under the constituency numbering system, it is designated as constituency 32. It is within the city of Leipzig. The constituency was created for the 2024 election.

== Geography ==
The constituency comprises the district of Nordeast, the East sub-districts of Volkmarsdorf and Anger-Crottendorf, and the North sub-districts of Seehausen and Wiederitzsch within the City of Leipzig.

There were 61,649 eligible voters in 2024.

== Members ==
Election	Member	Party	%
2024	Holger Gasse	CDU	32.0

== Election results ==
=== 2024 election ===
Changes are compared to notional results based on the new district.

State election (2024): Leipzig 8
Notes:	Blue background denotes the winner of the electorate vote. Pink background denotes a candidate elected from their party list. Yellow background denotes an electorate win by a list member, or other incumbent. A ✓ or ✗ denotes status of any incumbent, win or lose respectively.						
Party	Candidate	Votes	%	±%	Party votes	%	±%
CDU	Holger Gasse	13,691	32.0	▲4.6	11,436	26.7	▼0.2
AfD	Holger Hentschel	10,845	25.4	▲2.4	10,202	23.8	▲1.6
Left	Uwe Fiedler	6,490	15.2	▼4.0	5,965	13.9	▼1.9
BSW	Michael Chelius	3,596	8.4		4,506	10.5	
Greens	Ulrike Gebhardt	3,310	7.7	▼5.0	3,503	8.2	▼4.8
SPD	Irena Rudolph-Kokot	2,873	6.7	▼2.2	3,864	9.0	▲0.2
FW	C. Friedrich Föster	910	2.1	▼0.6	671	1.6	▼0.6
FDP	Daniel Eich	645	1.5	▼1.8	410	1.0	▼2.6
Independent	Ralf Detlef Kohl	382	0.9				
PARTEI					668	1.6	▼1.2
APT					543	1.3	
Freie Sachsen					497	1.2	
Pirates					172	0.4	
V-Partei3					110	0.3	
BD					90	0.2	
dieBasis					64	0.1	
Values					57	0.1	
ÖDP					53	0.1	
BüSo					31	0.1	
Bündnis C					23	0.1	
Informal votes		448			325		
Total valid votes		42,742			42,865		
Turnout		43,190	70.1				
CDU win new seat	Majority	2,846	6.6				

== See also ==
- Politics of Saxony
- Landtag of Saxony
