= Dresden 8 =

State electoral district of Germany

47: Dresden 8
- Electoral district for the Landtag of Saxony
- Dresden 8 in 2024
- District: Dresden
- Electorate: 55,380 (2024)
- Major settlements: City-district Plauen, city-district Cotta, districts of Löbtau-Nord and Löbtau-Süd

Current electoral district
- Party: CDU
- Member: Ingo Flemming

Dresden 8 is an electoral constituency (German: Wahlkreis) represented in the Landtag of Saxony. It elects one member via first-past-the-post voting. Under the constituency numbering system, it is designated as constituency 47. It is within the city of Dresden. The district was created for the 2024 election.

== Geography ==
The constituency comprises the city-district Plauen, city-district Cotta, districts of Löbtau-Nord and Löbtau-Süd within the city of Dresden.

There were 55,380 eligible voters in 2024.

== Members ==
Election	Member	Party	%
2024	Ingo Flemming	CDU	32.5

== Election results ==
=== 2024 election ===
Vote share changes are notional as this is a new seat.

State election (2024): Dresden 8
Notes:	Blue background denotes the winner of the electorate vote. Pink background denotes a candidate elected from their party list. Yellow background denotes an electorate win by a list member, or other incumbent. A ✓ or ✗ denotes status of any incumbent, win or lose respectively.						
Party	Candidate	Votes	%	±%	Party votes	%	±%
CDU	Ingo Flemming	14,026	32.5	▲4.7	12,750	29.4	▲4.1
AfD	Christian Pinkert	9,395	21.8	▲2.8	8,047	18.5	▲1.1
Greens	Agnes Schartnetzky	7,720	17.9	▼0.7	6,148	14.2	▼6.1
SPD	Albrecht Pallas	5,436	12.6	▲0.4	5,603	12.9	▲3.8
BSW					4,389	10.1	
Left	Kristin Dänhardt	3,133	7.3	▼7.4	2,709	6.2	▼5.2
Independent	Peter Hering	1,288	3.0				
FW	Lorenz Weber	1,000	2.3		509	1.2	▼1.7
FDP	Sven Gärtner	842	2.0	▼3.4	626	1.4	▼4.8
PARTEI					604	1.4	▼1.4
Freie Sachsen	Viola Walter	272	0.6		594	1.4	
Pirates					464	1.1	
APT					368	0.8	
BD					139	0.3	
V-Partei3					102	0.2	
Values					95	0.2	
dieBasis					82	0.2	
ÖDP					70	0.2	
BüSo					48	0.1	
Bündnis C					41	0.1	
Informal votes		471			195		
Total valid votes		43,112			43,388		
Turnout		43,583	78.7	▲2.2			
CDU win new seat	Majority	4,631	10.7				

== See also ==
- Politics of Saxony
- Landtag of Saxony
