= Nordsachsen 1 =

State electoral district of Germany

33: Nordsachsen 1
- Electoral district for the Landtag of Saxony
- Nordsachsen 1 in 2024
- District: Nordsachsen
- Electorate: 50,244 (2024)
- Major settlements: Delitzsch and Schkeuditz

Current electoral district
- Party: CDU
- Member: Tina Trompter

Nordsachsen 1 is an electoral constituency (German: Wahlkreis) represented in the Landtag of Saxony. It elects one member via first-past-the-post voting. Under the constituency numbering system, it is designated as constituency 33. It is within the district of Nordsachsen.

== Geography ==
The constituency comprises the towns of Delitzsch and Schkeuditz, and the municipalities of Krostitz, Löbnitz, Rackwitz, Schönwölkau, and Wiedemar within the district of Nordsachsen.

There were 50,244 eligible voters in 2024.

== Members ==
Election	Member	Party	%
2014	Volker Tiefensee	CDU	46.9
2019	Jörg Kiesewetter	CDU	35.4
2024	Tina Trompter	CDU	39.8

== Election results ==
=== 2024 election ===
State election (2024): Nordsachsen 1
Notes:	Blue background denotes the winner of the electorate vote. Pink background denotes a candidate elected from their party list. Yellow background denotes an electorate win by a list member, or other incumbent. A ✓ or ✗ denotes status of any incumbent, win or lose respectively.						
Party	Candidate	Votes	%	±%	Party votes	%	±%
CDU	Tina Trompter	13,767	39.8	▲4.3	11,903	34.3	▼0.7
AfD	R. Walter Hermann Ulbrich	13,170	38.0	▲9.2	11,111	32.0	▲4.7
BSW					4,413	12.7	
SPD	Adrian Schneider	2,657	7.7	▼0.3	2,581	7.4	▼1.1
FW	Steffen Richter	2,235	6.5	▲0.6	849	2.4	▼2.4
Left	Christian Stoye	1,758	5.1	▼7.2	924	2.7	▼7.0
Greens	Denis Korn	664	1.9	▼3.8	836	2.4	▼3.0
Freie Sachsen					701	2.0	
APT					465	1.3	
FDP	Laurenz Frenzel	364	1.1	▼2.8	292	0.8	▼3.3
PARTEI					247	0.7	▼0.3
BD					122	0.4	
Values					65	0.2	
Pirates					62	0.2	
V-Partei3					42	0.1	
dieBasis					41	0.1	
BüSo					39	0.1	
Bündnis C					21	0.1	
ÖDP					13	0.0	
Informal votes		500			388		
Total valid votes		34,615			34,727		
Turnout		35,115	69.9	▲18.1			
CDU hold	Majority	597	1.8				

=== 2019 election ===
State election (2019): Nordsachsen 1
Notes:	Blue background denotes the winner of the electorate vote. Pink background denotes a candidate elected from their party list. Yellow background denotes an electorate win by a list member, or other incumbent. A ✓ or ✗ denotes status of any incumbent, win or lose respectively.						
Party	Candidate	Votes	%	±%	Party votes	%	±%
CDU	Jörg Kiesewetter	10,390	35.5	▼11.4	10,264	34.9	▼8.9
AfD	Roland Ulbrich	8,446	28.8		8,016	27.3	▲19.4
Left	Christian Stoye	3,610	12.3	▼11.6	2,825	9.6	▼10.1
SPD	Matin Holke	2,325	7.9	▼6.6	2,508	8.5	▼4.3
FW	Constantin	1,717	5.9		1,412	4.8	▲2.8
Greens	Anna Schneider	1,681	5.7	▲1.8	1,598	5.4	▲1.8
FDP	Detlef Mainz	1,135	3.9	▲0.9	1,205	4.1	▲1.0
APT					516	1.8	▲0.7
PARTEI					299	1.0	▲0.6
Verjüngungsforschung					185	0.6	
NPD					138	0.5	▼3.7
The Blue Party					122	0.4	
Pirates					83	0.3	▼0.6
Awakening of German Patriots - Central Germany					54	0.2	
Humanists					49	0.2	
ÖDP					35	0.1	
PDV					33	0.1	
DKP					32	0.1	
BüSo					13	0.0	▼0.1
Informal votes		423			340		
Total valid votes		29,304			29,387		
Turnout		29,727	59.0	▲18.6			
CDU hold	Majority	1,944	6.7	▼16.3			

=== 2014 election ===
State election (2014): Nordsachsen 1
Notes:	Blue background denotes the winner of the electorate vote. Pink background denotes a candidate elected from their party list. Yellow background denotes an electorate win by a list member, or other incumbent. A ✓ or ✗ denotes status of any incumbent, win or lose respectively.						
Party	Candidate	Votes	%	±%	Party votes	%	±%
CDU	Volker Tiefensee	9,483	46.9		8,924	43.8	
Left		4,825	23.9		4,012	19.7	
SPD		2,934	14.5		2,602	12.8	
AfD					1,616	7.9	
NPD		1,213	6.0		858	4.2	
Greens		792	3.9		723	3.6	
FDP		617	3.0		638	3.1	
FW					401	2.0	
APT					229	1.1	
Pirates		366	1.8		179	0.9	
PARTEI					73	0.4	
Pro Germany Citizens' Movement					60	0.3	
DSU					23	0.1	
BüSo					18	0.1	
Informal votes		416			290		
Total valid votes		20,230			20,356		
Turnout		20,646	40.4	▼16.6			
CDU win new seat	Majority	4,658	23.0				

== See also ==
- Politics of Saxony
- Landtag of Saxony
