= Bautzen 5/Budyšin 5 =

State electoral district of Germany

56: Bautzen 5/Budyšin 5
- Electoral district for the Landtag of Saxony
- Bautzen 5/Budyšin 5 in 2024
- District: Bautzen
- Electorate: 46,847 (2024)
- Major settlements: Bautzen and Weißenberg

Current electoral district
- Party: AfD
- Member: Jörg Urban

Bautzen 5/Budyšin 5 is an electoral constituency (German: Wahlkreis) represented in the Landtag of Saxony. It elects one member via first-past-the-post voting. Under the constituency numbering system, it is designated as constituency 56. It is within the district of Bautzen.

== Geography ==
The constituency comprises the towns of Bautzen and Weißenberg, and the municipalities of Doberschau-Gaußig, Großdubrau, Hochkirch, Kubschütz, and Malschwitz within the district of Bautzen.

There were 46,847 eligible voters in 2024.

== Members ==
Election	Member	Party	%
2014	Marko Schiemann	CDU	42.0
2019	Marko Schiemann	CDU	38.0
2024	Jörg Urban	AfD	42.4

== Election results ==
=== 2024 election ===
State election (2024): Bautzen 5/Budyšin 5
Notes:	Blue background denotes the winner of the electorate vote. Pink background denotes a candidate elected from their party list. Yellow background denotes an electorate win by a list member, or other incumbent. A ✓ or ✗ denotes status of any incumbent, win or lose respectively.						
Party	Candidate	Votes	%	±%	Party votes	%	±%
AfD	Jörg Urban	14,610	42.4	▲6.1	13,558	39.4	▲2.9
CDU	✗ Marko Schiemann	13,119	38.1	▲0.1	11,184	32.5	▼0.5
BSW	Peter Franz Josef Temme	2,507	7.3		3,738	10.8	
FW	Mike Hauschild	1,202	3.5	▼0.1	643	1.9	▼0.9
SPD	Alexander Michael Ahrens	826	2.4	▼1.3	1,597	4.6	▼0.9
Left	Andrea Kubank	791	2.3	▼6.1	708	2.1	▼5.6
Greens	Christian Schäfer	507	1.5	▼2.5	800	2.3	▼2.4
PARTEI	Antje Tischer	423	1.2		298	0.9	▼0.6
FDP	Martin Nedo	236	0.7	▼5.1	230	0.7	▼3.8
Freie Sachsen	Philipp Hartel	226	0.7		906	2.6	
APT					334	1.0	
Values					113	0.3	
BD					101	0.3	
Pirates					71	0.2	
dieBasis					58	0.2	
Bündnis C					50	0.1	
V-Partei3					30	0.1	
BüSo					21	0.1	
ÖDP					14	0.0	
Informal votes		296			289		
Total valid votes		34,447			34,454		
Turnout		34,743	74.2	▲5.0			
AfD gain from CDU	Majority	1,491	4.3				

=== 2019 election ===
State election (2019): Bautzen 5/Budyšin 5
Notes:	Blue background denotes the winner of the electorate vote. Pink background denotes a candidate elected from their party list. Yellow background denotes an electorate win by a list member, or other incumbent. A ✓ or ✗ denotes status of any incumbent, win or lose respectively.						
Party	Candidate	Votes	%	±%	Party votes	%	±%
CDU	✓ Marko Schiemann	12,426	38.0	▼4.0	10,806	33.0	▼3.1
AfD	Jörg Urban	11,900	36.4		11,928	36.4	▲21.6
Left	Heiko Kosel	2,734	8.4	▼11.7	2,515	7.7	▼8.7
FDP	Mike Hauschild	1,900	5.8	▲0.5	1,449	4.4	▲0.7
Greens	Siegfried Kühn	1,297	4.0	▲0.6	1,553	4.7	▲1.1
SPD	Harald Baumann-Haßke	1,197	3.7	▼6.7	1,801	5.5	▼4.1
FW	Ralf Zeidler	1,179	3.6		918	2.8	▲1.2
PARTEI					471	1.4	▲0.9
APT					444	1.4	▲0.2
NPD					200	0.6	▼10.3
Verjüngungsforschung					194	0.6	
The Blue Party					96	0.3	
Awakening of German Patriots - Central Germany					87	0.3	
Pirates					79	0.2	▼0.7
ÖDP					67	0.2	
PDV					44	0.1	
DKP					37	0.1	
Humanists					37	0.1	
BüSo	Tobias Faku	101	0.3		32	0.1	▼0.1
Informal votes		350			326		
Total valid votes		32,734			32,758		
Turnout		33,084	67.6	▲14.5			
CDU hold	Majority	526	1.6	▼20.3			

=== 2014 election ===
State election (2014): Bautzen 5
Notes:	Blue background denotes the winner of the electorate vote. Pink background denotes a candidate elected from their party list. Yellow background denotes an electorate win by a list member, or other incumbent. A ✓ or ✗ denotes status of any incumbent, win or lose respectively.						
Party	Candidate	Votes	%	±%	Party votes	%	±%
CDU	Marko Schiemann	11,169	42.0		9,660	36.1	
Left		5,331	20.1		4,394	16.4	
AfD					3,954	14.8	
NPD		3,660	13.8		2,907	10.9	
SPD		2,754	10.4		2,580	9.6	
FDP		1,662	6.3		984	3.7	
Greens		1,228	4.6		953	3.6	
FW					439	1.6	
APT					324	1.2	
Pirates		768	2.9		231	0.9	
PARTEI					127	0.5	
Pro Germany Citizens' Movement					101	0.4	
DSU					55	0.2	
BüSo					53	0.2	
Informal votes		574			384		
Total valid votes		26,572			26,762		
Turnout		27,146	53.1	▲0.3			
CDU win new seat	Majority	5,838	21.9				

== See also ==
- Politics of Saxony
- Landtag of Saxony
