= Dresden 2 =

State electoral district of Germany

41: Dresden 2
- Electoral district for the Landtag of Saxony
- Dresden 2 in 2024
- District: Dresden
- Electorate: 55,694 (2024)
- Major settlements: City-district Neustadt, and sub-districts Johannstadt-Nord, and Johannstadt-Süd (Altstadt)

Current electoral district
- Party: Grüne
- Member: Thomas Löser

Dresden 2 is an electoral constituency (German: Wahlkreis) represented in the Landtag of Saxony. It elects one member via first-past-the-post voting. Under the constituency numbering system, it is designated as constituency 41. It is within the city of Dresden.

== Geography ==
The constituency comprises the district of Neustadt; and the sub-districts of Johannstadt-Nord and Johannstadt-Süd of the district of Altstadt within the city of Dresden.

There were 55,694 eligible voters in 2024.

== Members ==
Election	Member	Party	%
2014	Christian Piwarz	CDU	34.5
2019	Christian Piwarz	CDU	32.4
2024	Thomas Löser	Grüne	36.4

== Election results ==
=== 2024 election ===
State election (2024): Dresden 2
Notes:	Blue background denotes the winner of the electorate vote. Pink background denotes a candidate elected from their party list. Yellow background denotes an electorate win by a list member, or other incumbent. A ✓ or ✗ denotes status of any incumbent, win or lose respectively.						
Party	Candidate	Votes	%	±%	Party votes	%	±%
Greens	Thomas Löser	16,100	36.4	▲4.1	9,494	21.4	▼7.8
CDU	Barbara Oehlke	9,175	20.7	▲2.2	10,569	23.8	▲4.2
AfD	Andreas Harlaß	5,893	13.3	▲0.3	5,669	12.8	▲0.8
BSW	Ulrike Rothe	3,972	9.0		3,777	8.5	
SPD	Sophie Koch	3,619	8.2	▼0.2	6,516	14.7	▲5.5
Left	Anja Stephan	3,571	8.1	▼11.5	5,039	11.4	▼5.5
Independent	Hendrik Dietrich	894	2.0				
PARTEI					805	1.8	▼1.6
FDP	Carl Gruner	465	1.1	▼2.7	521	1.2	▼3.0
Pirates					502	1.1	
FW	Stefan Schneider	377	0.9		250	0.6	▼1.1
Freie Sachsen	Katja Kaiser	116	0.3		373	0.8	
APT					283	0.6	
V-Partei3					112	0.3	
dieBasis					97	0.2	
BD					93	0.2	
Values					90	0.2	
ÖDP					68	0.2	
BüSo	Boris Heider	75	0.2		39	0.1	
Bündnis C					38	0.1	
Informal votes		270			192		
Total valid votes		44,257			44,335		
Turnout		44,527	79.9	▲6.5			
Greens win new seat	Majority	6,925	15.7				

=== 2019 election ===
State election (2019): Dresden 2
Notes:	Blue background denotes the winner of the electorate vote. Pink background denotes a candidate elected from their party list. Yellow background denotes an electorate win by a list member, or other incumbent. A ✓ or ✗ denotes status of any incumbent, win or lose respectively.						
Party	Candidate	Votes	%	±%	Party votes	%	±%
CDU	✓ Christian Piwarz	14,449	32.4	▼2.1	13,589	30.3	▼7.8
AfD	André Wendt	12,396	27.8	▲19.7	11,426	25.5	▲16.4
Greens	Andrea Mühle	6,124	13.7	▲6.4	5,285	11.8	▲3.2
Left	Franziska Fehst	4,830	10.8	▼7.2	4,065	9.1	▼8.8
SPD	Kristin Sturm	3,414	7.7	▼11.4	3,613	8.1	▼4.9
FDP	Andreas Mogwitz	3,358	7.5	▲2.8	2,939	6.6	▲2.3
FW					1,567	3.5	▲2.2
PARTEI					625	1.4	▲0.7
APT					572	1.3	▲0.2
NPD					229	0.5	▼3.7
Verjüngungsforschung					208	0.5	
ÖDP					154	0.3	
Pirates					149	0.3	▼0.8
The Blue Party					137	0.3	
Humanists					91	0.2	
Awakening of German Patriots - Central Germany					83	0.2	
DKP					39	0.1	
PDV					31	0.1	
BüSo					30	0.1	▼0.2
Informal votes		652			391		
Total valid votes		44,571			44,832		
Turnout		45,223	71.2	▼13.8			
CDU hold	Majority	2,053	4.6	▼10.8			

=== 2014 election ===
State election (2014): Dresden 2
Notes:	Blue background denotes the winner of the electorate vote. Pink background denotes a candidate elected from their party list. Yellow background denotes an electorate win by a list member, or other incumbent. A ✓ or ✗ denotes status of any incumbent, win or lose respectively.						
Party	Candidate	Votes	%	±%	Party votes	%	±%
CDU	Christian Piwarz	12,583	34.5		13,944	38.1	
SPD		6,983	19.1		4,757	13.0	
Left		6,587	18.0		6,565	17.9	
AfD		2,944	8.1		3,314	9.1	
Greens		2,655	7.3		3,144	8.6	
FDP		1,721	4.7		1,584	4.3	
NPD		1,291	3.5		1,520	4.2	
FW		1,007	2.8		477	1.3	
APT					415	1.1	
Pirates		595	1.6		413	1.1	
PARTEI					271	0.7	
BüSo		134	0.4		102	0.3	
Pro Germany Citizens' Movement					51	0.1	
DSU					32	0.1	
Informal votes		514			425		
Total valid votes		36,500			36,589		
Turnout		37,014	57.4	▲0.2			
CDU win new seat	Majority	5,600	15.4				

== See also ==
- Politics of Saxony
- Landtag of Saxony
