= Dresden 5 =

State electoral district of Germany

44: Dresden 5
- Electoral district for the Landtag of Saxony
- Dresden 5 in 2024
- District: Dresden
- Electorate: 48,687 (2024)
- Major settlements: City-district Blasewitz excluding Tolkewitz/Seidnitz-Nord and Seidnitz/Dobritz

Current electoral district
- Party: CDU
- Member: Martin Modschiedler

Dresden 5 is an electoral constituency (German: Wahlkreis) represented in the Landtag of Saxony. It elects one member via first-past-the-post voting. Under the constituency numbering system, it is designated as constituency 44. It is within the city of Dresden.

== Geography ==
The constituency comprises the city-district of Blasewitz excluding Tolkewitz/Seidnitz-Nord and Seidnitz/Dobritz within the city of Dresden.

There were 48,687 eligible voters in 2024.

== Members ==
Election	Member	Party	%
2014	Patrick Schreiber	CDU	29.7
2019	Thomas Löser	Grüne	24.1
2024	Martin Modschiedler	CDU	39.5

== Election results ==
=== 2024 election ===
State election (2024): Dresden 5
Notes:	Blue background denotes the winner of the electorate vote. Pink background denotes a candidate elected from their party list. Yellow background denotes an electorate win by a list member, or other incumbent. A ✓ or ✗ denotes status of any incumbent, win or lose respectively.						
Party	Candidate	Votes	%	±%	Party votes	%	±%
CDU	Martin Modschiedler	15,515	39.5	▲8.5	13,412	34.1	▲4.2
AfD	Martina Jost	7,775	19.8	▲1.1	7,091	18.0	▲0.9
Greens	Jacob Kempe	4,495	11.4	▼9.4	5,197	13.2	▼5.8
SPD	Lutz Hoffmann	3,743	9.5	▼0.1	4,984	12.7	▲3.2
BSW	Anke Wagner	3,549	9.0		3,906	9.9	
Left	Tilo Wirtz	2,048	5.2	▼7.7	1,801	4.6	▼5.6
Independent	Sebastian Heide	938	2.4				
FW	Anja Reinhardt	609	1.5		420	1.1	▼1.7
FDP	Steve Görnitz	492	1.3	▼4.2	487	1.2	▼4.8
Freie Sachsen	Kay Welzel	139	0.4		508	1.3	
PARTEI					416	1.1	▼0.8
APT					318	0.8	
Pirates					291	0.7	
BD					121	0.3	
Values					111	0.3	
dieBasis					89	0.2	
V-Partei3					85	0.2	
ÖDP					61	0.2	
Bündnis C					36	0.1	
BüSo					28	0.1	
Informal votes		281			222		
Total valid votes		39,303			39,362		
Turnout		39,584	81.3	▲3.1			
CDU gain from Greens	Majority	7,740	19.7				

=== 2019 election ===
State election (2019): Dresden 5
Notes:	Blue background denotes the winner of the electorate vote. Pink background denotes a candidate elected from their party list. Yellow background denotes an electorate win by a list member, or other incumbent. A ✓ or ✗ denotes status of any incumbent, win or lose respectively.						
Party	Candidate	Votes	%	±%	Party votes	%	±%
Greens	Thomas Löser	10,612	24.1	▲10.1	9,159	20.7	▲8.3
CDU	Gunter Thiele	10,368	23.5	▼6.2	10,913	24.6	▼5.8
Left	André Schollbach	8,247	18.7	▼7.9	6,749	15.2	▼7.7
AfD	Joachim Keiler	7,841	17.8	▲11.4	7,238	16.3	▲9.5
SPD	Sabine Friedel	3,205	7.3	▼4.0	4,007	9.0	▼5.2
FDP	Lydia Streller	2,069	4.7	▲1.6	2,201	5.0	▲1.8
PARTEI	Charlotte Brock	1,537	3.5	▲1.1	1,208	2.7	▲0.6
FW					973	2.2	▲1.1
APT					509	1.1	▼0.2
Pirates					315	0.7	▼1.9
ÖDP					240	0.5	
Humanists					207	0.5	
Verjüngungsforschung					175	0.4	
NPD					120	0.3	▼2.1
The Blue Party					87	0.2	
BüSo	Michael Gründler	240	0.5	▲0.2	63	0.1	▼0.2
DKP					50	0.1	
Awakening of German Patriots - Central Germany					39	0.1	
PDV					36	0.1	
Informal votes		476			308		
Total valid votes		44,119			44,287		
Turnout		44,595	71.7	▲14.6			
Greens gain from CDU	Majority	244	0.6				

=== 2014 election ===
State election (2014): Dresden 5
Notes:	Blue background denotes the winner of the electorate vote. Pink background denotes a candidate elected from their party list. Yellow background denotes an electorate win by a list member, or other incumbent. A ✓ or ✗ denotes status of any incumbent, win or lose respectively.						
Party	Candidate	Votes	%	±%	Party votes	%	±%
CDU	Patrick Schreiber	10,537	29.7		10,818	30.4	
Left		9,423	26.6		8,152	22.9	
Greens		4,978	14.0		4,420	12.4	
SPD		4,016	11.3		5,071	14.2	
AfD		2,254	6.4		2,427	6.8	
FDP		1,089	3.1		1,137	3.2	
Pirates		913	2.6		934	2.6	
PARTEI		840	2.4		738	2.1	
NPD		734	2.1		869	2.4	
FW		570	1.6		387	1.1	
APT					461	1.3	
BüSo		120	0.3		94	0.3	
Pro Germany Citizens' Movement					58	0.2	
DSU					34	0.1	
Informal votes		518			392		
Total valid votes		35,474			35,600		
Turnout		35,992	57.1	▲0.2			
CDU win new seat	Majority	1,114	3.1				

== See also ==
- Politics of Saxony
- Landtag of Saxony
