= Zwickau 2 =

State electoral district of Germany

5: Zwickau 2
- Electoral district for the Landtag of Saxony
- Zwickau 2 in 2024
- District: Zwickau
- Electorate: 54,311 (2024)
- Major settlements: Crimmitschau, Werdau, and the West of the City of Zwickau

Current electoral district
- Party: AfD
- Member: Heiko Gumprecht

Zwickau 2 is an electoral constituency (German: Wahlkreis) represented in the Landtag of Saxony. It elects one member via first-past-the-post voting. Under the constituency numbering system, it is designated as constituency 5. It is within the district of Zwickau.

== Geography ==
The constituency includes the towns of Crimmitschau and Werdau, the municipalities of Dennheritz, Fraureuth, Langenbernsdorf, and Neukirchen, and the West of the City of Zwickau within Zwickau.

There were 54,311 eligible voters in 2024

== Members ==
Election	Member	Party	%
2014	Jan Löffler	CDU	44.6
2019	Jan Löffler	CDU	39.1
2024	Heiko Gumprecht	AfD	37.0

== Election results ==
=== 2024 election ===
State election (2024): Zwickau 2
Notes:	Blue background denotes the winner of the electorate vote. Pink background denotes a candidate elected from their party list. Yellow background denotes an electorate win by a list member, or other incumbent. A ✓ or ✗ denotes status of any incumbent, win or lose respectively.						
Party	Candidate	Votes	%	±%	Party votes	%	±%
AfD	Heiko Gumprecht	14,211	37.0	▲7.2	13,248	34.4	▲6.1
CDU	✗ Jan Löffler	13,879	36.1	▼2.9	13,038	33.8	▼2.5
BSW	Heiko Döhler	4,839	12.6		5,673	14.7	
SPD	Katrin Synofzik	1,540	4.0	▼2.8	2,024	5.3	▼2.2
Left	Ute Brückner	1,288	3.4	▼10.1	864	2.2	▼8.6
FW	Dirk Schirmer	1,051	2.7		608	1.6	▼0.7
Greens	André Oehler	712	1.9	▼4.7	783	2.0	▼3.0
FDP	Billy Bauer	421	1.1	▼3.2	347	0.9	▼3.3
Independent	Andreas Parthum	250	0.7				
Freie Sachsen	Jens Geithe	204	0.5		801	2.1	
APT					424	1.1	
PARTEI					257	0.7	▼0.5
BD					124	0.3	
Bündnis C					85	0.2	
dieBasis					63	0.2	
Values					61	0.2	
Pirates					55	0.1	
V-Partei3					37	0.1	
BüSo					24	0.1	
ÖDP					18	0.0	
Informal votes		488			349		
Total valid votes		38,395			38,534		
Turnout		38,883	71.6	▲10.3			
AfD gain from CDU	Majority	322	0.9				

=== 2019 election ===
State election (2019): Zwickau 2
Notes:	Blue background denotes the winner of the electorate vote. Pink background denotes a candidate elected from their party list. Yellow background denotes an electorate win by a list member, or other incumbent. A ✓ or ✗ denotes status of any incumbent, win or lose respectively.						
Party	Candidate	Votes	%	±%	Party votes	%	±%
CDU	✓ Jan Löffler	13,565	39.1	▼5.8	12,682	36.3	▼7.5
AfD		10,350	29.8		9,881	28.3	▲19.8
Left		4,683	13.5	▼8.3	3,776	10.8	▼8.8
SPD		2,349	6.8	▼4.5	2,593	7.4	▼3.9
Greens		2,260	6.5	▲2.6	1,771	5.1	▲1.7
FDP		1,501	4.3	▼0.8	1,469	4.2	▲0.8
FW					782	2.2	▲0.1
APT					623	1.8	▲0.7
PARTEI					399	1.1	▲0.7
NPD					273	0.8	▼4.4
Verjüngungsforschung					182	0.5	
Awakening of German Patriots - Central Germany					102	0.3	
The Blue Party					97	0.3	
Pirates					70	0.2	▼0.6
ÖDP					52	0.1	
Humanists					52	0.1	
DKP					42	0.1	
PDV					34	0.1	
BüSo					15	0.0	▼0.2
Informal votes		560			373		
Total valid votes		34,708			34,895		
Turnout		35,268	61.2	▲17.8			
CDU hold	Majority	3,215	9.3	▼13.8			

=== 2014 election ===
State election (2014): Vogtland I
Notes:	Blue background denotes the winner of the electorate vote. Pink background denotes a candidate elected from their party list. Yellow background denotes an electorate win by a list member, or other incumbent. A ✓ or ✗ denotes status of any incumbent, win or lose respectively.						
Party	Candidate	Votes	%	±%	Party votes	%	±%
CDU	Jan Löffler	11,601	44.9		11,396	43.8	
Left		5,629	21.8		5,094	19.6	
SPD		2,910	11.3		2,931	11.3	
AfD					2,200	8.5	
NPD		1,605	6.2		1,355	5.2	
FDP		1,319	5.1		888	3.4	
FW		1,209	4.7		544	2.1	
Greens		995	3.9		879	3.4	
APT					282	1.1	
Pirates		374	1.4		205	0.8	
PARTEI					97	0.4	
BüSo		194	0.8		63	0.2	
Pro Germany Citizens' Movement					51	0.2	
DSU					33	0.1	
Informal votes		537			355		
Total valid votes		25,836			26,018		
Turnout		26,373	43.4	▼14.6			
CDU win new seat	Majority	5,972	23.1				

== See also ==
- Politics of Saxony
- Landtag of Saxony
