= Leipzig Land 4 =

State electoral district of Germany

24: Leipzig Land 4
- Electoral district for the Landtag of Saxony
- Leipzig Land 4 in 2024
- District: Leipzig (district)
- Electorate: 48,205 (2024)
- Major settlements: Brandis, Trebsen/Mulde, and Wurzen

Current electoral district
- Party: CDU
- Member: Kay Ritter

Leipzig Land 4 is an electoral constituency (German: Wahlkreis) represented in the Landtag of Saxony. It elects one member via first-past-the-post voting. Under the constituency numbering system, it is designated as constituency 24. It is within the district of Leipzig.

== Geography ==
The constituency comprises the towns of Brandis, Trebsen/Mulde, and Wurzen, and the municipalities of Bennewitz, Borsdorf, Lossatal, Machern, and Thallwitz within the district of Leipzig.

There were 48,205 eligible voters in 2024.

== Members ==
Election	Member	Party	%
2014	Hannelore Dietzschold	CDU	45.9
2019	Kay Ritter	CDU	32.2
2024	Kay Ritter	CDU	38.2

== Election results ==
=== 2024 election ===
State election (2024): Leipzig Land 4
Notes:	Blue background denotes the winner of the electorate vote. Pink background denotes a candidate elected from their party list. Yellow background denotes an electorate win by a list member, or other incumbent. A ✓ or ✗ denotes status of any incumbent, win or lose respectively.						
Party	Candidate	Votes	%	±%	Party votes	%	±%
CDU	✓ Kay Ritter	13,370	38.2	▲6.0	11,343	32.2	▼2.8
AfD	Mike René Opolka	12,304	35.2	▲6.1	11,268	32.0	▲3.2
BSW					3,986	11.3	
FW	Thomas Schumann	3,612	10.3	▼1.0	2,268	6.4	▲1.6
Left	Jens Kretzschmar	2,032	5.8	▼5.5	899	2.6	▼6.0
SPD	Thomas Glaser	2,012	5.8	▼2.3	2,472	7.0	▼1.1
Greens	Thomas Keller	852	2.4	▼2.5	927	2.6	▼3.0
Freie Sachsen	Eric Sallie	427	1.2		847	2.4	
APT					372	1.1	
FDP	Markus Piontek	377	1.1	▼2.1	260	0.7	▼2.8
PARTEI					170	0.5	▼0.4
BD					100	0.3	
dieBasis					65	0.2	
Values					63	0.2	
Bündnis C					59	0.2	
Pirates					53	0.2	
V-Partei3					37	0.1	
BüSo					13	0.0	
ÖDP					11	0.0	
Informal votes		571			344		
Total valid votes		34,986			35,213		
Turnout		35,557	73.8	▲10.4			
CDU hold	Majority	1,066	3.0				

=== 2019 election ===
State election (2019): Leipzig Land 4
Notes:	Blue background denotes the winner of the electorate vote. Pink background denotes a candidate elected from their party list. Yellow background denotes an electorate win by a list member, or other incumbent. A ✓ or ✗ denotes status of any incumbent, win or lose respectively.						
Party	Candidate	Votes	%	±%	Party votes	%	±%
CDU	Kay Ritter	10,241	32.2	▼13.7	11,141	35.0	▼9.7
AfD	Jens Zaunick	9,226	29.0	▲19.9	9,180	28.8	▲
Left	Jens Kretzschmar	3,610	11.4	▼7.0	2,732	8.6	▼9.1
FW	Dieter Dietze	3,585	11.3		1,539	4.8	▲3.4
SPD	Birgit Killian	2,547	8.0	▼4.3	2,581	8.1	▼3.6
Greens	Annett Schmidt	1,572	4.9	▼0.7	1,795	5.6	▲1.0
FDP	Sebastian Drews	1,005	3.2	▲0.5	1,126	3.5	▲0.2
APT					558	1.8	▲0.4
PARTEI					283	0.9	▲0.5
NPD					222	0.7	▼4.3
Verjüngungsforschung					206	0.6	
The Blue Party					146	0.5	
Awakening of German Patriots - Central Germany					99	0.3	
Pirates					72	0.2	▼0.7
ÖDP					63	0.2	
DKP					33	0.1	
Humanists					32	0.1	
PDV					30	0.1	
BüSo					20	0.1	Steady
Informal votes		419			347		
Total valid votes		31,786			31,858		
Turnout		32,205	65.8	▲17.5			
CDU hold	Majority	1,015	3.2	▼24.3			

=== 2014 election ===
State election (2014): Leipzig Land 4
Notes:	Blue background denotes the winner of the electorate vote. Pink background denotes a candidate elected from their party list. Yellow background denotes an electorate win by a list member, or other incumbent. A ✓ or ✗ denotes status of any incumbent, win or lose respectively.						
Party	Candidate	Votes	%	±%	Party votes	%	±%
CDU	Hannelore Dietzschold	10,874	45.9		10,607	44.7	
Left		4,354	18.4		4,199	17.7	
SPD		2,914	12.3		2,769	11.7	
AfD		2,150	9.1		2,051	8.6	
Greens		1,332	5.6		1,084	4.6	
NPD		1,137	4.8		1,182	5.0	
FDP		650	2.7		794	3.3	
FW					333	1.4	
APT					329	1.4	
Pirates		282	1.2		207	0.9	
PARTEI					90	0.4	
Pro Germany Citizens' Movement					44	0.2	
DSU					36	0.2	
BüSo					27	0.1	
Informal votes		460			401		
Total valid votes		23,693			23,752		
Turnout		24,153	48.3				
CDU win new seat	Majority	6,520	27.5				

== See also ==
- Politics of Saxony
- Landtag of Saxony
