= Bautzen 1/Budyšin 1 =

State electoral district of Germany

52: Bautzen 1/Budyšin 1
- Electoral district for the Landtag of Saxony
- Bautzen 1/Budyšin 1 in 2024
- District: Bautzen
- Electorate: 50,167 (2024)
- Major settlements: Bischofswerda, Schirgiswalde-Kirschau, and Wilthen

Current electoral district
- Party: AfD
- Member: Frank Peschel

Bautzen 1/Budyšin 1 is an electoral constituency (German: Wahlkreis) represented in the Landtag of Saxony. It elects one member via first-past-the-post voting. Under the constituency numbering system, it is designated as constituency 52. It is within the district of Bautzen.

== Geography ==
The constituency comprises the towns of Bischofswerda, Schirgiswalde-Kirschau, and Wilthen, and the municipalities of Burkau, Cunewalde, Demitz-Thumitz, Frankenthal, Göda, Großharthau, Großpostwitz, Neukirch, Obergurig, Rammenau, Schmölln-Putzkau, Sohland, and Steinigtwolmsdorf within the district of Bautzen.

There were 50,167 eligible voters in 2024.

== Members ==
| Election | Member | Party | % |
|---|---|---|---|
| 2014 | Patricia Wissel | CDU | 46.4 |
| 2019 | Frank Peschel | AfD | 38.2 |
| 2024 | Frank Peschel | AfD | 49.1 |

== Election results ==
=== 2024 election ===
State election (2024): Bautzen 1/Budyšin 1
| Notes: | Blue background denotes the winner of the electorate vote. Pink background denotes a candidate elected from their party list. Yellow background denotes an electorate win by a list member, or other incumbent. A ✓ or ✗ denotes status of any incumbent, win or lose respectively. | | | | | | |
| Party | Candidate | Votes | % | ±% | Party votes | % | ±% |
|---|---|---|---|---|---|---|---|
| AfD | ✓ Frank Peschel | 18,640 | 49.1 | ▲10.9 | 15,991 | 41.9 | ▲5.0 |
| CDU | Bernd Gerhard Grüber | 13,407 | 35.3 | ▼2.8 | 12,034 | 31.5 | ▼3.1 |
| BSW | | | | | 4,079 | 10.7 | |
| FW | Andreas Ehrentraut | 1,785 | 4.7 | ▲1.1 | 690 | 1.8 | ▼1.1 |
| SPD | Laura Lisa Stellbrink | 1,450 | 3.8 | ▼1.7 | 1,655 | 4.3 | ▼1.4 |
| Freie Sachsen | | | | | 998 | 2.6 | |
| Left | Jana Lübeck | 1,242 | 3.3 | ▼4.5 | 684 | 1.8 | ▼5.0 |
| FDP | Matthias Eckstädt | 662 | 1.7 | ▼2.0 | 298 | 0.8 | ▼3.7 |
| Greens | Susann Kolba | 439 | 1.2 | ▼2.0 | 557 | 1.5 | ▼1.9 |
| APT | | | | | 384 | 1.0 | |
| PARTEI | | | | | 229 | 0.6 | ▼0.4 |
| Values | H. Jörg Schneider | 336 | 0.9 | | 205 | 0.5 | |
| BD | | | | | 110 | 0.3 | |
| dieBasis | | | | | 74 | 0.2 | |
| Bündnis C | | | | | 73 | 0.2 | |
| Pirates | | | | | 70 | 0.2 | |
| V-Partei3 | | | | | 26 | 0.1 | |
| BüSo | | | | | 23 | 0.1 | |
| ÖDP | | | | | 19 | 0.0 | |
| Informal votes | | 604 | | | 366 | | |
| Total valid votes | | 37,961 | | | 38,199 | | |
| Turnout | | 38,565 | 76.9 | ▲6.1 | | | |
| AfD hold | Majority | 5,233 | 13.8 | | | | |

=== 2019 election ===
State election (2019): Bautzen 1/Budyšin 1
| Notes: | Blue background denotes the winner of the electorate vote. Pink background denotes a candidate elected from their party list. Yellow background denotes an electorate win by a list member, or other incumbent. A ✓ or ✗ denotes status of any incumbent, win or lose respectively. | | | | | | |
| Party | Candidate | Votes | % | ±% | Party votes | % | ±% |
|---|---|---|---|---|---|---|---|
| AfD | Frank Peschel | 13,683 | 38.2 | | 13,227 | 36.8 | ▲23.6 |
| CDU | ✗ Patricia Wissel | 13,653 | 38.1 | ▼8.3 | 12,429 | 34.6 | ▼7.7 |
| Left | Felix Muster | 2,774 | 7.7 | ▼9.2 | 2,429 | 6.8 | ▼7.5 |
| SPD | Anja Hennersdorf | 1,978 | 5.5 | ▼6.4 | 2,062 | 5.7 | ▼4.5 |
| FDP | Sirko Rosenberg | 1,330 | 3.7 | ▼0.5 | 1,616 | 4.5 | ▲0.8 |
| FW | Walter Georg Senft | 1,299 | 3.6 | ▼2.0 | 1,043 | 2.9 | ▲0.6 |
| Greens | Peter Jahn-Bresan | 1,144 | 3.2 | ▲0.4 | 1,218 | 3.4 | ▲0.8 |
| APT | | | | | 540 | 1.5 | ▲0.3 |
| PARTEI | | | | | 367 | 1.0 | ▲0.6 |
| NPD | | | | | 258 | 0.7 | ▼7.7 |
| Verjüngungsforschung | | | | | 221 | 0.6 | |
| The Blue Party | | | | | 140 | 0.4 | |
| ÖDP | | | | | 87 | 0.2 | |
| Awakening of German Patriots - Central Germany | | | | | 85 | 0.2 | |
| Pirates | | | | | 70 | 0.2 | ▼0.5 |
| Humanists | | | | | 46 | 0.1 | |
| PDV | | | | | 37 | 0.1 | |
| DKP | | | | | 30 | 0.1 | |
| BüSo | | | | | 18 | 0.1 | ▼0.1 |
| Informal votes | | 486 | | | 424 | | |
| Total valid votes | | 35,861 | | | 35,923 | | |
| Turnout | | 36,347 | 69.6 | ▲14.7 | | | |
| AfD gain from CDU | Majority | 30 | 0.1 | | | | |

=== 2014 election ===
State election (2014): Butzen 1
| Notes: | Blue background denotes the winner of the electorate vote. Pink background denotes a candidate elected from their party list. Yellow background denotes an electorate win by a list member, or other incumbent. A ✓ or ✗ denotes status of any incumbent, win or lose respectively. | | | | | | |
| Party | Candidate | Votes | % | ±% | Party votes | % | ±% |
|---|---|---|---|---|---|---|---|
| CDU | Patricia Wissel | 13,663 | 46.4 | | 12,536 | 42.3 | |
| Left | | 4,980 | 16.9 | | 4,230 | 14.3 | |
| AfD | | | | | 3,895 | 13.2 | |
| SPD | | 3,501 | 11.9 | | 3,035 | 10.2 | |
| NPD | | 3,146 | 10.7 | | 2,500 | 8.4 | |
| FW | | 1,643 | 5.6 | | 690 | 2.3 | |
| FDP | | 1,230 | 4.2 | | 1,087 | 3.7 | |
| Greens | | 812 | 2.8 | | 765 | 2.6 | |
| APT | | | | | 343 | 1.2 | |
| Pirates | | 464 | 1.6 | | 220 | 0.7 | |
| PARTEI | | | | | 131 | 0.4 | |
| Pro Germany Citizens' Movement | | | | | 78 | 0.3 | |
| BüSo | | | | | 59 | 0.2 | |
| DSU | | | | | 49 | 0.2 | |
| Informal votes | | 664 | | | 485 | | |
| Total valid votes | | 29,439 | | | 29,618 | | |
| Turnout | | 30,103 | 54.9 | ▼1.4 | | | |
| CDU win new seat | Majority | 8,683 | 29.5 | | | | |

== See also ==
- Politics of Saxony
- Landtag of Saxony
