= Dresden 6 =

State electoral district of Germany

45: Dresden 6
- Electoral district for the Landtag of Saxony
- Dresden 6 in 2024
- District: Dresden
- Electorate: 51,177 (2024)
- Major settlements: City-district Altstadt excluding Johannstadt-Nord and Johannstadt-Süd; city-district Pieschen excluding Kaditz, Mickten, and Trachau; Strehlen from city-district Prohlis

Current electoral district
- Party: CDU
- Member: Barbara Klepsch

Dresden 6 is an electoral constituency (German: Wahlkreis) represented in the Landtag of Saxony. It elects one member via first-past-the-post voting. Under the constituency numbering system, it is designated as constituency 45. It is within the city of Dresden.

== Geography ==
The constituency comprises the city-district Altstadt excluding Johannstadt-Nord and Johannstadt-Süd; city-district Pieschen excluding Kaditz, Mickten, and Trachau; and Strehlen from city-district Prohlis within the city of Dresden.

There were 51,177 eligible voters in 2024.

== Members ==
Election	Member	Party	%
2014	Lars Rohwer	CDU	34.2
2019	Lars Rohwer	CDU	31.0
2024	Barbara Klepsch	CDU	31.5

== Election results ==
=== 2024 election ===
State election (2024): Dresden 6
Notes:	Blue background denotes the winner of the electorate vote. Pink background denotes a candidate elected from their party list. Yellow background denotes an electorate win by a list member, or other incumbent. A ✓ or ✗ denotes status of any incumbent, win or lose respectively.						
Party	Candidate	Votes	%	±%	Party votes	%	±%
CDU	Barbara Klepsch	11,537	31.5	▲7.7	9,621	26.1	▲3.2
AfD	Heike Christa Winter	7,703	21.1	▲2.7	6,569	17.8	▲0.7
Greens	Valentin Lippmann	6,804	18.6	▼3.7	5,397	14.7	▼5.2
BSW					3,640	9.9	
Left	André Schollbach	4,454	12.2	▼5.2	3,408	9.3	▼5.7
SPD	Stefan Engel	3,715	10.2	▲2.6	4,733	12.9	▲4.1
PARTEI					661	1.8	▼1.5
FW	Julia Förster	969	2.6		377	1.0	▼1.5
FDP	Thomas Kunz	775	2.1	▼3.1	550	1.5	▼3.9
Freie Sachsen	Jörg Groß	380	1.0		494	1.3	
Pirates					461	1.3	
APT					365	1.0	
V-Partei3					113	0.3	
BD					110	0.3	
dieBasis					86	0.2	
Values					74	0.2	
ÖDP					59	0.2	
BüSo	Birgitta Gründler	236	0.6		48	0.1	
Bündnis C					44	0.1	
Informal votes		444			207		
Total valid votes		36,573			36,810		
Turnout		37,017	72.3	▲8.0			
CDU hold	Majority	3,834	10.4				

=== 2019 election ===
State election (2019): Dresden 6
Notes:	Blue background denotes the winner of the electorate vote. Pink background denotes a candidate elected from their party list. Yellow background denotes an electorate win by a list member, or other incumbent. A ✓ or ✗ denotes status of any incumbent, win or lose respectively.						
Party	Candidate	Votes	%	±%	Party votes	%	±%
CDU	✓ Lars Rohwer	12,088	31.0	▼3.2	10,312	26.3	▼9.1
AfD	Andreas Harlaß	10,492	26.9	▲17.6	9,785	24.9	▲15.6
Greens	Lucie Hammecke	5,523	14.2	▲6.5	5,700	14.5	▲5.4
Left	Jenny Kunkel	4,890	12.5	▼5.8	3,974	10.1	▼7.6
SPD	Sophie Koch	3,566	9.1	▼8.9	3,027	7.7	▼5.3
FDP	Holger Hase	2,431	6.2	▲3.0	2,261	5.8	▲2.1
FW					1,430	3.6	▲1.7
PARTEI					886	2.3	▲0.8
APT					539	1.4	Steady
Pirates					255	0.7	▼1.3
Verjüngungsforschung					201	0.5	
Humanists					192	0.5	
ÖDP					173	0.4	
NPD					162	0.4	▼4.0
The Blue Party					125	0.3	
Awakening of German Patriots - Central Germany					80	0.2	
PDV					52	0.1	
DKP					39	0.1	
BüSo					28	0.1	▼0.2
Informal votes		492			261		
Total valid votes		38,990			39,221		
Turnout		39,482	68.3	▲16.3			
CDU hold	Majority	1,596	4.1	▼11.8			

=== 2014 election ===
State election (2014): Dresden 6
Notes:	Blue background denotes the winner of the electorate vote. Pink background denotes a candidate elected from their party list. Yellow background denotes an electorate win by a list member, or other incumbent. A ✓ or ✗ denotes status of any incumbent, win or lose respectively.						
Party	Candidate	Votes	%	±%	Party votes	%	±%
CDU	Lars Rohwer	10,259	34.2		10,627	35.4	
Left		5,494	18.3		5,331	17.7	
SPD		5,406	18.0		3,916	13.0	
AfD		2,797	9.3		2,804	9.3	
Greens		2,296	7.7		2,723	9.1	
NPD		1,115	3.7		1,310	4.4	
FDP		963	3.2		1,109	3.7	
FW		803	2.7		585	1.9	
Pirates		680	2.3		600	2.0	
PARTEI					438	1.5	
APT					434	1.4	
BüSo		149	0.5		86	0.3	
DSU					46	0.2	
Pro Germany Citizens' Movement					46	0.2	
Informal votes		379			286		
Total valid votes		29,962			30,055		
Turnout		30,341	52.0	▲0.7			
CDU win new seat	Majority	4,765	15.9				

== See also ==
- Politics of Saxony
- Landtag of Saxony
