= 1990 Saxony state election =

State election in Saxony, Germany

← 1950 (GDR)	14 October 1990	1994 →

All 160 seats in the Landtag of Saxony 81 seats needed for a majority
- Turnout: 2,632,455 (72.8%)
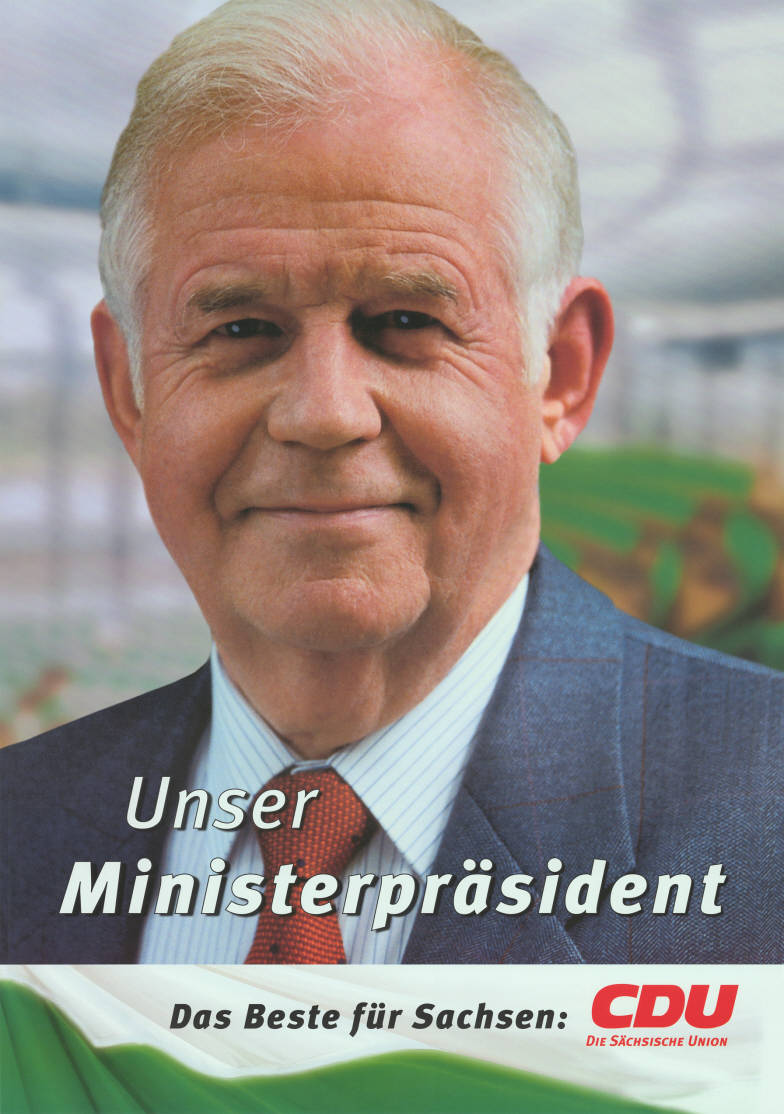

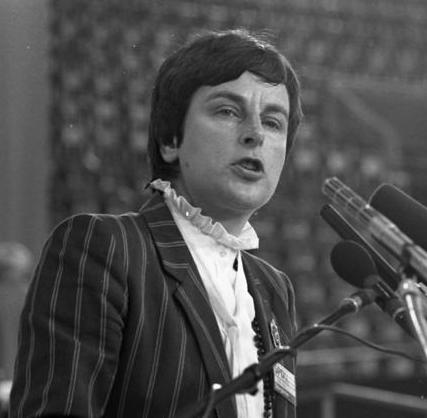
	First party	Second party	Third party
Leader	Kurt Biedenkopf	Anke Fuchs
Party	CDU	SPD	PDS
Seats won	92	32	17
Popular vote	1,417,332	502,755	269,420
Percentage	53.8%	19.1%	10.2%
	Fourth party	Fifth party
Leader		Axel Viehweger
Party	New Forum	FDP
Seats won	10	9
Popular vote	147,543	138,376
Percentage	5.6%	5.3%
- Results for the single-member constituencies
Elected Minister-President
Kurt Biedenkopf
CDU

The 1990 Saxony state election was held on 14 October 1990 to elect the members of the first Landtag of Saxony. It was the first election held in Saxony since the reunification of Germany, which took place on 3 October. The Christian Democratic Union (CDU) led by Kurt Biedenkopf dominated the election with 53.8% of the vote, followed by the Social Democratic Party (SPD) with 19.1%. Biedenkopf subsequently became Saxony's first post-reunification Minister-President.

== Parties ==
The table below lists parties which won seats in the election.

Name		Ideology	Leader(s)
CDU	Christian Democratic Union of Germany; Christlich Demokratische Union Deutschlands	Christian democracy	Kurt Biedenkopf
SPD	Social Democratic Party of Germany; Sozialdemokratische Partei Deutschlands	Social democracy	Anke Fuchs
PDS	Party of Democratic Socialism; Partei des Demokratischen Sozialismus	Democratic socialism	
Forum	New Forum; Neues Forum	Green politics	
FDP	Free Democratic Party; Freie Demokratische Partei	Classical liberalism	Axel Viehweger

== Election result ==

Summary of the 14 October 1990 election results for the Landtag of Saxony
Party	Votes	%	Seats	Seats %
Christian Democratic Union (CDU)	1,417,332	53.8	92	57.5
Social Democratic Party (SPD)	502,755	19.1	32	20.0
Party of Democratic Socialism (PDS)	269,420	10.2	17	10.6
New Forum (FORUM)	147,543	5.6	10	6.3
Free Democratic Party (FDP)	138,376	5.3	9	5.6
German Social Union (DSU)	93,347	3.5	0	0
Others	63,682	2.4	0	0
Total	2,632,455	100.0	160	
Voter turnout		72.8		

Popular Vote
CDU	53.84%
SPD	19.10%
PDS	10.23%
FORUM	5.60%
FDP	5.26%
DSU	3.55%
Other	2.42%

Landtag seats
CDU	57.50%
SPD	20.00%
PDS	10.63%
FORUM	6.25%
FDP	5.63%

== Sources ==
- Statisches Landesamt Sachsen
