= 1994 Saxony state election =

Saxony state election

← 1990	11 September 1994	1999 →

All 120 seats in the Landtag of Saxony 61 seats needed for a majority
- Turnout: 2,063,872 (58.4%) ▼14.4 pp
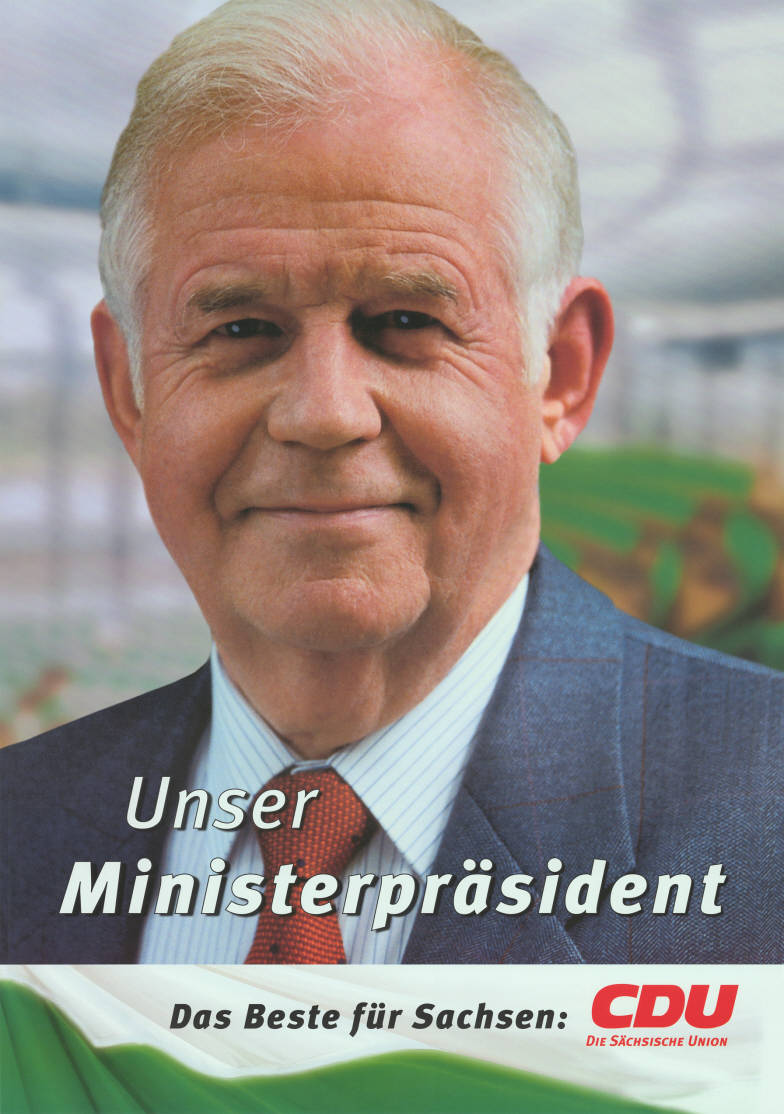
	First party	Second party	Third party
Leader	Kurt Biedenkopf
Party	CDU	SPD	PDS
Last election	92 seats, 53.8%	32 seats, 19.1%	17 seats, 10.2%
Seats won	77	22	21
Seat change	▼15	▼10	▲4
Popular vote	1,199,883	342,706	339,619
Percentage	58.1%	16.6%	16.5%
Swing	▲4.3 pp	▼2.5 pp	▲6.3 pp
- Results for the single-member constituencies
Minister-President before election
Kurt Biedenkopf
CDU
Elected Minister-President
Kurt Biedenkopf
CDU

The 1994 Saxony state election was held on 11 September 1994 to elect the members of the 2nd Landtag of Saxony. The incumbent Christian Democratic Union (CDU) government led by Minister-President Kurt Biedenkopf retained its majority and continued in office.

== Parties ==
The table below lists parties represented in the 1st Landtag of Saxony.

Name		Ideology	Leader(s)	1990 result	
Name		Ideology	Leader(s)	Votes (%)	Seats
CDU	Christian Democratic Union of Germany; Christlich Demokratische Union Deutschlands	Christian democracy	Kurt Biedenkopf	53.8%	92 / 160
SPD	Social Democratic Party of Germany; Sozialdemokratische Partei Deutschlands	Social democracy		19.1%	32 / 160
PDS	Party of Democratic Socialism; Partei des Demokratischen Sozialismus	Democratic socialism		10.2%	17 / 160
Grüne	Alliance 90/The Greens; Bündnis 90/Die Grünen	Green politics		5.6%	10 / 160
FDP	Free Democratic Party; Freie Demokratische Partei	Classical liberalism		5.3%	9 / 160

== Election result ==

Summary of the 11 September 1994 election results for the Landtag of Saxony
Party	Votes	%	+/-	Seats	+/-	Seats %
Christian Democratic Union (CDU)	1,199,883	58.1	▲4.3	77	▼15	64.2
Social Democratic Party (SPD)	341,706	16.6	▼3.5	22	▼10	18.3
Party of Democratic Socialism (PDS)	339,619	16.5	▲6.3	21	▲4	17.5
Alliance 90/The Greens (Grüne)	85,485	4.1	▼1.5	0	▼10	0
Free Democratic Party (FDP)	36,075	1.7	▼3.6	0	▼9	0
The Republicans (REP)	26,177	1.3	▲1.3	0	±0	0
Others	33,837	1.6		0	±0	0
Total	2,063,782	100.0		120	▼40	
Voter turnout		58.4	▼14.4			

Popular Vote
CDU	58.14%
PDS	16.61%
SPD	16.46%
B'90/GRÜNE	4.14%
FDP	1.75%
Other	2.91%

Landtag seats
CDU	64.17%
PDS	18.33%
SPD	17.50%

== Sources ==
- Statisches Landesamt Sachsen
