= List of state constituencies in Saxony =

State parliament constituencies in Saxony since 2024.

This list of state constituencies in Saxony lists all constituencies for the election of the Landtag of Saxony.

== Overview ==
The Landtag of Saxony has 120 members. Of these, 60 are elected via state lists (second vote) and another 60 via constituencies (first vote). The constituency candidate with a relative majority is elected in each constituency. In the event of a tie, the elected candidate is determined by lot, drawn by the district election returning officer.

Unlike the rules for federal elections, state election law provides for compensatory seats if a party wins more constituency representatives than it would be entitled to based on its share of the second vote (overhang seats). This ensures that the strength of the parliamentary groups always corresponds to the result of the second vote.

The constituencies themselves are regulated in the annex to Section 2 Paragraph 1 of the Saxon Electoral Law.

For the first state election in 1990, the state of Saxony was divided into 80 constituencies. The minimum number of seats was 160. The division of the constituencies, along with that of the other new federal states, was determined by the People's Chamber (Volkskammer). The constituencies were intended to comprise approximately 60,000 inhabitants, with a maximum deviation of 25 percent.

For the 1994 state election, the number of seats was reduced to 120 and the number of constituencies to 60. The constituencies were also adjusted to reflect the municipal reorganization. The boundaries were changed again for the 2004 state election, and these constituency descriptions remained in effect for the 2009 state election. A further redrawing of boundaries took place for the 2014 state election to account for the second district reform and population changes.

For the 2024 Saxony state election, the constituencies were redrawn and redrawn to reflect the population decline in rural areas and the growing populations in the cities of Leipzig and Dresden. Vogtland now has only 3 constituencies, and Middle Saxony only 4. In return, Leipzig and Dresden each receive an eighth constituency.

== Constituencies ==
=== Constituencies for the 2024 election ===
Number	Constituency	Area	Eligible voters
Number	Constituency	Area	2024
1	Vogtland 1	Cities: Plauen, Pausa-Mühltroff Municipalities: Rosenbach, Weischlitz in Vogtlandkreis	61,178
2	Vogtland 2	Cities: Adorf, Auerbach, Bad Elster, Falkenstein, Klingenthal, Markneukirchen, Rodewisch, Schöneck Municipalities: Bad Brambach, Ellefeld, Grünbach, Mühlental, Muldenhammer, Neustadt, Steinberg in Vogtlandkreis	59,051
3	Vogtland 3	Cities: Elsterberg, Lengenfeld, Netzschkau, Oelsnitz, Reichenbach im Vogtland, Treuen Municipalities: Bergen, Bösenbrunn, Eichigt, Heinsdorfergrund, Limbach, Neumark, Neuensalz, Pöhl, Theuma, Tirpersdorf, Triebel, Werda in Vogtlandkreis	58,471
4	Zwickau 1	Cities: Hartenstein, Kirchberg, Wildenfels, Wilkau-Haßlau Municipalities: Crinitzberg, Hartmannsdorf, Hirschfeld, Langenweißbach, Lichtentanne, Mülsen, Reinsdorf in Zwickau district	45,919
5	Zwickau 2	Cities: Crimmitschau, Werdau Municipalities: Dennheritz, Fraureuth, Langenbernsdorf, Neukirchen City district: West of the city Zwickau in Landkreis Zwickau	54,311
6	Zwickau 3	City districts of Mitte, Ost, Nord and Süd and the city of Zwickau in Zwickau district	54,753
7	Zwickau 4	Cities: Glauchau, Lichtenstein, Meerane, Waldenburg Municipalities: Bernsdorf, Oberwiera, Remse, Schönberg, St. Egidien in Zwickau district	48,548
8	Zwickau 5	Cities: Hohenstein-Ernstthal, Limbach-Oberfrohna, Oberlungwitz Municipalities: Callenberg, Gersdorf, Niederfrohna in Zwickau district	44,303
9	Chemnitz 1	City of Chemnitz districts: Altendorf, Grüna, Hutholz, Kaßberg, Mittelbach, Morgenleite, Rabenstein, Reichenbrand, Röhrsdorf, Rottluff, Schloßchemnitz, Siegmar and Stelzendorf	62,113
10	Chemnitz 2	City of Chemnitz districts: Borna-Heinersdorf, Ebersdorf, Furth, Gablenz, Glösa-Draisdorf, Hilbersdorf, Lutherviertel, Sonnenberg, Wittgensdorf, Yorckgebiet and Zentrum	61,172
11	Chemnitz 3	City of Chemnitz districts: Adelsberg, Altchemnitz, Bernsdorf, Einsiedel, Erfenschlag, Euba, Harthau, Helbersdorf, Kapellenberg, Kappel, Klaffenbach, Kleinolbersdorf-Altenhain, Markersdorf, Reichenhain and Schönau	59,892
12	Erzgebirge 1	Cities: Lugau, Oelsnitz, Stollberg, Thalheim Municipalities: Amtsberg, Auerbach, Burkhardtsdorf, Gornsdorf, Hohndorf, Jahnsdorf, Neukirchen, Niederdorf, Niederwürschnitz in Erzgebirgskreis	56,630
13	Erzgebirge 2	Cities: Aue-Bad Schlema, Eibenstock, Schneeberg Municipalities: Bockau, Schönheide, Stützengrün, Zschorlau in Erzgebirgskreis	44,807
14	Erzgebirge 3	Cities: Elterlein, Grünhain-Beierfeld, Johanngeorgenstadt, Lauter-Bernsbach, Lößnitz, Schwarzenberg, Zwönitz Municipalities: Breitenbrunn, Raschau-Markersbach in Erzgebirgskreis	54,504
15	Erzgebirge 4	Cities: Annaberg-Buchholz, Ehrenfriedersdorf, Geyer, Jöhstadt, Oberwiesenthal, Scheibenberg, Schlettau, Thum Municipalities: Bärenstein, Crottendorf, Gelenau, Königswalde, Mildenau, Sehmatal, Tannenberg, Thermalbad Wiesenbad in Erzgebirgskreis	54,630
16	Erzgebirge 5	Cities: Marienberg, Olbernhau, Pockau-Lengefeld, Wolkenstein, Zschopau Municipalities: Börnichen, Deutschneudorf, Drebach, Gornau, Großolbersdorf, Großrückerswalde, Grünhainichen, Heidersdorf, Seiffen in Erzgebirgskreis	56,844
17	Mittelsachsen 1	Cities: Frauenstein, Freiberg, Großschirma, Sayda Municipalities: Bobritzsch-Hilbersdorf, Dorfchemnitz, Halsbrücke, Lichtenberg, Mulda, Neuhausen, Rechenberg-Bienenmühle, Reinsberg im Landkreis Mittelsachsen	59,644
18	Mittelsachsen 2	Cities: Augustusburg, Brand-Erbisdorf, Flöha, Frankenberg, Hainichen, Oederan Municipalities: Eppendorf, Großhartmannsdorf, Leubsdorf, Niederwiesa, Oberschöna im Landkreis Mittelsachsen	58,262
19	Mittelsachsen 3	Cities: Burgstädt, Lunzenau, Mittweida, Penig, Rochlitz Municipalities: Altmittweida, Claußnitz, Erlau, Hartmannsdorf, Königsfeld, Königshain-Wiederau, Lichtenau, Mühlau, Rossau, Seelitz, Taura, Wechselburg, Zettlitz im Landkreis Mittelsachsen	60,971
20	Mittelsachsen 4	Cities: Döbeln, Geringswalde, Hartha, Leisnig, Roßwein, Waldheim Municipalities: Großweitzschen, Kriebstein, Jahnatal, Rossau, Striegistal im Landkreis Mittelsachsen	60,817
21	Leipzig Land 1	Cities: Borna, Frohburg, Geithain, Kitzscher, Regis-Breitingen, Rötha Municipalities: Neukieritzsch in Landkreis Leipzig	49,209
22	Leipzig Land 2	Cities: Böhlen, Groitzsch, Markkleeberg, Markranstädt, Pegau, Zwenkau Municipalities: Elstertrebnitz in Landkreis Leipzig	58,654
23	Leipzig Land 3	Cities: Bad Lausick, Colditz, Grimma, Naunhof Municipalities: Belgershain, Großpösna, Otterwisch, Parthenstein in Landkreis Leipzig	54,499
24	Leipzig Land 4	Cities: Brandis, Trebsen/Mulde, Wurzen Municipalities: Bennewitz, Borsdorf, Lossatal, Machern, Thallwitz in Landkreis Leipzig	48,205
25	Leipzig 1	From the city of Leipzig, the city district Mitte excluding the sub-districts Zentrum-Nordwest and Zentrum-Nord; from the city district Ost, the sub-district Neustadt-Neuschönefeld, from the city district Südost, the sub-district Reudnitz-Thonberg	59,218
26	Leipzig 2	From the city of Leipzig the eastern district excluding the districts of Neustadt-Neuschönefeld, Volkmarsdorf and Anger-Crottendorf, from the southeastern district the suburbs of Liebertwolkwitz, Holzhausen and Stötteritz.	58,868
27	Leipzig 3	From the city of Leipzig, the Nord district excluding the districts of Seehausen and Wiederitzsch; from the central district, the district of Zentrum-Nord.	51,596
28	Leipzig 4	From the city of Leipzig the southern district, from the southeastern district the districts of Probstheida and Meusdorf.	58,899
29	Leipzig 5	From the city of Leipzig the western district, the southwest district excluding the stadtteils of Schleußig and Plagwitz	60,331
30	Leipzig 6	From the city of Leipzig, the districts of Schleußig and Plagwitz from the Southwest district, and the district of Alt-West excluding the districts of Böhlitz-Ehrenberg and Burghausen-Rückmarsdorf	54,817
31	Leipzig 7	From the city of Leipzig the Northwest district, from the Central district the North-West district, from the Old West district the Böhlitz-Ehrenberg and Burghausen-Rückmarsdorf districts	46,264
32	Leipzig 8	From the city of Leipzig the Northeast district, from the East district the districts of Volkmarsdorf and Anger-Crottendorf, from the North district the districts of Seehausen and Wiederitzsch.	61,649
33	Nordsachsen 1	Cities: Delitzsch, Schkeuditz Gemeinden: Krostitz, Löbnitz, Rackwitz, Schönwölkau andWiedemar in Landkreis Nordsachsen	50,244
34	Nordsachsen 2	Cities: Bad Düben, Dommitzsch, Eilenburg, Taucha Municipalities: Doberschütz, Elsnig, Jesewitz, Laußig, Mockrehna, Trossin, Zschepplin in Landkreis Nordsachsen	50,759
35	Nordsachsen 3	Cities: Belgern-Schildau, Dahlen, Mügeln, Oschatz, Torgau Municipalities: Arzberg, Beilrode, Cavertitz, Dreiheide, Liebschützberg, Naundorf, Wermsdorf in Landkreis Nordsachsen	57,556
36	Meißen 1	Cities: Lommatzsch, Riesa, Strehla Municipalities: Diera-Zehren, Hirschstein, Käbschütztal, Stauchitz, Zeithain in Landkreis Meißen	43,835
37	Meißen 2	Cities: Gröditz, Großenhain, Radeburg Municipalities: Ebersbach, Glaubitz, Lampertswalde, Nünchritz, Priestewitz, Röderaue, Schönfeld, Thiendorf, Wülknitz in Landkreis Meißen	48,153
38	Meißen 3	Cities: Meißen, Nossen Municipalities: Klipphausen, Niederau, Weinböhla in Landkreis Meißen	50,723
39	Meißen 4	Cities: Coswig und Radebeul Municipalities: Moritzburg in Landkreis Meißen:	50,344
40	Dresden 1	From the city of Dresden the borough of Klotzsche, from the borough of Pieschen the districts of Kaditz, Mickten and Trachau, from the borough of Loschwitz, the forest of Dresdner Heide, the villages of Langebrück, Schönborn and Weixdorf	47,614
41	Dresden 2	From the city of Dresden, the borough of Neustadt, from the district of Altstadt the districts of Johannstadt-Nord and Johannstadt-Süd	55,694
42	Dresden 3	From the city of Dresden, the borough of Leuben, the borough of Loschwitz without the forest of Dresdner Heide, the village of Schönfeld-Weißig	57,061
43	Dresden 4	From the city of Dresden, from the Blasewitz borough, the Tolkewitz/Seidnitz-Nord and Seidnitz/Dobritz districts, and the Prohlis district excluding the Strehlen district.	54,080
44	Dresden 5	From the city of Dresden, the Blasewitz borough excluding the Tolkewitz/Seidnitz-Nord and Seidnitz/Dobritz districts.	48,687
45	Dresden 6	From the city of Dresden the Altstadt borough without the Johannstadt-Nord and Johannstadt-Süd neighborhoods, the Pieschen borough without the Kaditz, Mickten and Trachau neighborhoods, from the Prohlis district the Strehlen neighborhood.	51,177
46	Dresden 7	From the city of Dresden the district of Cotta without Löbtau-Nord and Löbtau-Süd, the villages of Altfranken, Cossebaude, Oberwartha, Mobschatz and Gompitz.	48,128
47	Dresden 8	From the city of Dresden the district of Plauen, from the district of Cotta the districts of Löbtau-Nord and Löbtau-Süd	55,380
48	Sächsische Schweiz-Osterzgebirge 1	Cities: Freital, Tharandt, Wilsdruff Municipalities: Dorfhain in Landkreis Sächsische Schweiz-Osterzgebirge	47,874
49	Sächsische Schweiz-Osterzgebirge 2	Cities: Altenberg, Dippoldiswalde, Glashütte, Rabenau Municipalities: Bannewitz, Hartmannsdorf-Reichenau, Hermsdorf, Klingenberg, Kreischa in Landkreis Sächsische Schweiz-Osterzgebirge	45,871
50	Sächsische Schweiz-Osterzgebirge 3	Cities: Bad Gottleuba-Berggießhübel, Dohna, Heidenau, Liebstadt, Pirna Municipalities: Bahretal, Dohma, Müglitztal in Landkreis Sächsische Schweiz-Osterzgebirge	59,886
51	Sächsische Schweiz-Osterzgebirge 4	Cities: Bad Schandau, Hohnstein, Königstein/Sächs. Schw., Neustadt i. Sa., Sebnitz, Stadt Wehlen, Stolpen Municipalities: Dürrröhrsdorf-Dittersbach, Gohrisch, Lohmen, Rathen, Rathmannsdorf, Reinhardtsdorf-Schöna, Rosenthal-Bielatal, Struppen in Landkreis Sächsische Schweiz-Osterzgebirge	42,980
52	Bautzen 1/Budyšin 1	Cities: Bischofswerda, Schirgiswalde-Kirschau, Wilthen Municipalities: Burkau, Cunewalde, Demitz-Thumitz, Frankenthal, Göda, Großharthau, Großpostwitz, Neukirch, Obergurig, Rammenau, Schmölln-Putzkau, Sohland, Steinigtwolmsdorf in Landkreis Bautzen	50,167
53	Bautzen 2/Budyšin 2	Cities: Elstra, Großröhrsdorf, Kamenz, Pulsnitz Municipalities: Arnsdorf, Crostwitz, Großnaundorf, Haselbachtal, Lichtenberg, Nebelschütz, Ohorn, Panschwitz-Kuckau, Räckelwitz, Ralbitz-Rosenthal, Steina in Landkreis Bautzen	47,316
54	Bautzen 3/Budyšin 3	Cities: Bernsdorf, Königsbrück, Radeberg, Wittichenau Municipalities: Laußnitz, Neukirch, Oßling, Ottendorf-Okrilla, Schwepnitz, Wachau in Landkreis Bautzen	46,176
55	Bautzen 4/Budyšin 4	Cities: Hoyerswerda, Lauta Municipalities: Elsterheide, Königswartha, Lohsa, Neschwitz, Puschwitz, Radibor, Spreetal in Landkreis Bautzen	48,673
56	Bautzen 5/Budyšin 5	Cities: Bautzen, Weißenberg Municipalities: Doberschau-Gaußig, Großdubrau, Hochkirch, Kubschütz, Malschwitz in Landkreis Bautzen	46,847
57	Görlitz 1/Zhorjelc 1/Zhorjelc 1	Cities: Bad Muskau, Niesky, Rothenburg, Weißwasser Municipalities: Boxberg, Gablenz, Groß Düben, Hähnichen, Hohendubrau, Horka, Kodersdorf, Krauschwitz, Kreba-Neudorf, Mücka, Neißeaue, Quitzdorf am See, Rietschen, Schleife, Schöpstal, Trebendorf, Waldhufen, Weißkeißel in Landkreis Görlitz	54,088
58	Görlitz 2/Zhorjelc 2	Cities: Görlitz, Reichenbach Municipalities: Königshain, Markersdorf, Vierkirchen in Landkreis Görlitz	49,869
59	Görlitz 3/Zhorjelc 3	Cities: Bernstadt a. d. Eigen, Ebersbach-Neugersdorf, Herrnhut, Löbau, Neusalza-Spremberg, Ostritz Municipalities: Beiersdorf, Dürrhennersdorf, Großschweidnitz, Kottmar, Lawalde, Oppach, Rosenbach, Schönau-Berzdorf ad Eigen, Schönbach in Landkreis Görlitz	48,159
60	Görlitz 4/Zhorjelc 4	Cities: Seifhennersdorf, Zittau Municipalities: Bertsdorf-Hörnitz, Großschönau, Hainewalde, Jonsdorf, Leutersdorf, Mittelherwigsdorf, Oderwitz, Olbersdorf, Oybin, in Landkreis Görlitz	45,313
		In total:	3,182,683

=== Constituencies used in 2014 and 2019 ===
Number	Constituency	Area	Election year	
Number	Constituency	Area	2014	2019
1	Vogtland 1	The city of Plauen in the Vogtland district	53,832	51,987
2	Vogtland 2	Cities: Adorf, Bad Elster, Markneukirchen, Oelsnitz, Pausa-Mühltroff, Schöneck, Municipalities: Bad Brambach, Bergen, Bösenbrunn, Eichigt, Mühlental, Reuth, Rosenbach, Theuma, Tirpersdorf, Triebel, Weischlitz, Werda im Vogtlandkreis	49,938	47,192
3	Vogtland 3	Cities: Auerbach, Falkenstein, Klingenthal, Treuen Municipalities: Ellefeld, Grünbach, Muldenhammer, Neuensalz, Neustadt im Vogtlandkreis	47,619	44,721
4	Vogtland 4	Cities: Elsterberg, Lengenfeld, Mylau (seit 2016 Ortsteil von Reichenbach), Netzschkau, Reichenbach im Vogtland, Rodewisch Municipalities: Heinsdorfergrund, Limbach, Neumark, Pöhl, Steinberg im Vogtlandkreis	47,733	45,150
5	Zwickau 1	Cities: Hartenstein, Kirchberg, Wildenfels, Wilkau-Haßlau Municipalities: Crinitzberg, Hartmannsdorf, Hirschfeld, Langenweißbach, Lichtentanne, Mülsen, Reinsdorf im Landkreis Zwickau	51,463	48,603
6	Zwickau 2	Cities: Crimmitschau, Werdau Municipalities: Dennheritz, Fraureuth, Langenbernsdorf, Neukirchen Stadtbezirk: West der Stadt Zwickau in Landkreis Zwickau	60,806	57,367
7	Zwickau 3	die Stadtbezirke Mitte, Ost, Nord und Süd der Stadt Zwickau im Landkreis Zwickau	63,006	59,199
8	Zwickau 4	Cities: Glauchau, Lichtenstein, Meerane, Waldenburg Municipalities: Bernsdorf, Oberwiera, Remse, Schönberg, St. Egidien im Landkreis Zwickau	54,420	51,308
9	Zwickau 5	Cities: Hohenstein-Ernstthal, Limbach-Oberfrohna, Oberlungwitz Municipalities: Callenberg, Gersdorf, Niederfrohna im Landkreis Zwickau	48,191	46,279
10	Chemnitz 1	von der Stadt Chemnitz die Stadtteile: Altendorf, Grüna, Hutholz, Kaßberg, Mittelbach, Morgenleite, Rabenstein, Reichenbrand, Röhrsdorf, Rottluff, Schloßchemnitz, Siegmar und Stelzendorf	66,330	64,599
11	Chemnitz 2	von der Stadt Chemnitz die Stadtteile: Borna-Heinersdorf, Ebersdorf, Furth, Gablenz, Glösa-Draisdorf, Hilbersdorf, Lutherviertel, Sonnenberg, Wittgensdorf, Yorckgebiet und Zentrum	67,247	64,813
12	Chemnitz 3	von der Stadt Chemnitz die Stadtteile: Adelsberg, Altchemnitz, Bernsdorf, Einsiedel, Erfenschlag, Euba, Harthau, Helbersdorf, Kapellenberg, Kappel, Klaffenbach, Kleinolbersdorf-Altenhain, Markersdorf, Reichenhain und Schönau	65,863	62,934
13	Erzgebirge 1	Städte: Lugau, Oelsnitz, Stollberg, Thalheim Gemeinden: Amtsberg, Auerbach, Burkhardtsdorf, Gornsdorf, Hohndorf, Jahnsdorf, Neukirchen, Niederdorf, Niederwürschnitz im Erzgebirgskreis	61,632	58,937
14	Erzgebirge 2	Städte: Aue, Eibenstock, Schneeberg Gemeinden: Bad Schlema, Bockau, Schönheide, Stützengrün, Zschorlau im Erzgebirgskreis	50,778	47,606
15	Erzgebirge 3	Städte: Elterlein, Grünhain-Beierfeld, Johanngeorgenstadt, Lauter-Bernsbach, Lößnitz, Schwarzenberg, Zwönitz Gemeinden: Breitenbrunn, Raschau-Markersbach im Erzgebirgskreis	61,434	57,841
16	Erzgebirge 4	Städte: Annaberg-Buchholz, Ehrenfriedersdorf, Geyer, Jöhstadt, Oberwiesenthal, Scheibenberg, Schlettau, Thum Gemeinden: Bärenstein, Crottendorf, Gelenau, Königswalde, Mildenau, Sehmatal, Tannenberg, Thermalbad Wiesenbad im Erzgebirgskreis	60,742	57,604
17	Erzgebirge 5	Städte: Marienberg, Olbernhau, Pockau-Lengefeld, Wolkenstein, Zschopau Gemeinden: Börnichen, Borstendorf, Deutschneudorf, Drebach, Gornau, Großolbersdorf, Großrückerswalde, Grünhainichen, Heidersdorf, Pfaffroda, Seiffen im Erzgebirgskreis	63,590	60,146
18	Mittelsachsen 1	Städte: Augustusburg, Brand-Erbisdorf, Flöha, Oederan, Sayda Gemeinden: Dorfchemnitz, Eppendorf, Großhartmannsdorf, Leubsdorf, Mulda, Neuhausen, Niederwiesa, Rechenberg-Bienenmühle im Landkreis Mittelsachsen	51.052	48.125
19	Mittelsachsen 2	Städte: Frauenstein, Freiberg, Großschirma Gemeinden: Bobritzsch-Hilbersdorf, Halsbrücke, Lichtenberg, Oberschöna, Reinsberg, Weißenborn im Landkreis Mittelsachsen	59.180	56.765
20	Mittelsachsen 3	Städte: Frankenberg, Hainichen, Mittweida Gemeinden: Altmittweida, Erlau, Kriebstein, Lichtenau, Rossau, Striegistal im Landkreis Mittelsachsen	51.772	49.419
21	Mittelsachsen 4	Städte: Döbeln, Hartha, Leisnig, Roßwein, Waldheim Gemeinden: Großweitzschen, Mochau, Ostrau, Zschaitz-Ottewig im Landkreis Mittelsachsen	54.937	51.767
22	Mittelsachsen 5	Städte: Burgstädt, Geringswalde, Lunzenau, Penig, Rochlitz Gemeinden: Claußnitz, Hartmannsdorf, Königsfeld, Königshain-Wiederau, Mühlau, Seelitz, Taura, Wechselburg, Zettlitz im Landkreis Mittelsachsen	47.851	45.135
23	Leipzig Land 1	Städte: Borna, Frohburg, Geithain, Kitzscher, Kohren-Sahlis, Neukieritzsch, Regis-Breitingen, Rötha Gemeinden: Deutzen, Espenhain, Narsdorf im Landkreis Leipzig	52.618	50.405
24	Leipzig Land 2	Städte: Böhlen, Groitzsch, Markkleeberg, Markranstädt, Pegau, Zwenkau Gemeinden: Elstertrebnitz im Landkreis Leipzig	58.695	58.791
25	Leipzig Land 3	Städte: Bad Lausick, Colditz, Grimma, Naunhof Gemeinden: Belgershain, Großpösna, Otterwisch, Parthenstein im Landkreis Leipzig	57.065	55.409
26	Leipzig Land 4	Städte: Brandis, Trebsen/Mulde, Wurzen Gemeinden: Bennewitz, Borsdorf, Lossatal, Machern, Thallwitz im Landkreis Leipzig	50.001	48.920
27	Leipzig 1	von der Stadt Leipzig der Stadtbezirk Ost ohne die Ortsteile Neustadt-Neuschönefeld und Volkmarsdorf und vom Stadtbezirk Südost die Ortsteile Holzhausen und Stötteritz	62.159	64.594
28	Leipzig 2	von der Stadt Leipzig der Stadtbezirk Süd und vom Stadtbezirk Südost die Ortsteile Liebertwolkwitz, Meusdorf und Probstheida	63.266	64.003
29	Leipzig 3	von der Stadt Leipzig der Stadtbezirk West, der Stadtbezirk Südwest ohne die Ortsteile Plagwitz und Schleußig und vom Stadtbezirk Altwest der Ortsteil Burghausen-Rückmarsdorf	65.269	65.204
30	Leipzig 4	von der Stadt Leipzig der Stadtbezirk Alt-West ohne den Ortsteil Burghausen-Rückmarsdorf, vom Stadtbezirk Südwest die Ortsteile Plagwitz und Schleußig und vom Stadtbezirk Nordwest der Ortsteil Lützschena-Stahmeln	61.263	65.387
31	Leipzig 5	von der Stadt Leipzig der Stadtbezirk Mitte und vom Stadtbezirk Südost der Ortsteil Reudnitz-Thonberg	58.340	63.414
32	Leipzig 6	von der Stadt Leipzig der Stadtbezirk Nordwest ohne den Ortsteil Lützschena-Stahmeln und der Stadtbezirk Nord ohne die Ortsteile Seehausen und Wiederitzsch	64.321	67.487
33	Leipzig 7	von der Stadt Leipzig vom Stadtbezirk Nord die Ortsteile Seehausen und Wiederitzsch und vom Stadtbezirk Ost die Ortsteile Neustadt-Neuschönefeld und Volkmarsdorf	57.706	60.689
34	Nordsachsen 1	Städte: Delitzsch, Schkeuditz Gemeinden: Krostitz, Löbnitz, Rackwitz, Schönwölkau und Wiedemar im Landkreis Nordsachsen	51.048	50.359
35	Nordsachsen 2	Städte: Bad Düben, Dommitzsch, Eilenburg, Taucha Gemeinden: Doberschütz, Elsnig, Jesewitz, Laußig, Mockrehna, Trossin, Zschepplin im Landkreis Nordsachsen	52.610	51.775
36	Nordsachsen 3	Städte: Belgern-Schildau, Dahlen, Mügeln, Oschatz, Torgau Gemeinden: Arzberg, Beilrode, Cavertitz, Dreiheide, Liebschützberg, Naundorf, Wermsdorf im Landkreis Nordsachsen	63.260	60.021
37	Meißen 1	Städte: Lommatzsch, Riesa, Strehla Gemeinden: Diera-Zehren, Hirschstein, Käbschütztal, Stauchitz, Zeithain im Landkreis Meißen	49.454	46.488
38	Meißen 2	Städte: Gröditz, Großenhain, Radeburg Gemeinden: Ebersbach, Glaubitz, Lampertswalde, Nünchritz, Priestewitz, Röderaue, Schönfeld, Tauscha, Thiendorf, Wülknitz im Landkreis Meißen	51.985	49.823
39	Meißen 3	Städte: Meißen, Nossen Gemeinden: Ketzerbachtal, Klipphausen, Leuben-Schleinitz, Niederau, Weinböhla im Landkreis Meißen	52.148	51.534
40	Meißen 4	Städte: Coswig und Radebeul Gemeinde: Moritzburg im Landkreis Meißen:	51.363	51.210
41	Dresden 1	von der Stadt Dresden der Ortsamtsbereich Klotzsche, der Ortsamtsbereich Neustadt ohne die Stadtteile Innere Neustadt mit Antonstadt-Süd und Leipziger Vorstadt, vom Ortsamtsbereich Loschwitz der Stadtteil Dresdner Heide und die Ortschaften Langebrück, Schönborn, Schönfeld-Weißig und Weixdorf	56.340	56.933
42	Dresden 2	von der Stadt Dresden der Ortsamtsbereich Leuben, der Ortsamtsbereich Loschwitz ohne den Stadtteil Dresdner Heide vom Ortsamtsbereich Prohlis die Stadtteile Niedersedlitz, Prohlis-Nord und Prohlis-Süd	64.446	63.508
43	Dresden 3	von der Stadt Dresden der Ortsamtsbereich Plauen und vom Ortsamtsbereich Prohlis die Stadtteile Leubnitz-Neuostra mit Torna und Mockritz-Ost, Lockwitz mit Kauscha, Luga und Nickern sowie Reick	63.990	61.930
44	Dresden 4	von der Stadt Dresden der Ortsamtsbereich Blasewitz ohne den Stadtteil Striesen-Süd mit Johannstadt-Südost	59.997	60.522
45	Dresden 5	von der Stadt Dresden der Ortsamtsbereich Altstadt ohne die Stadtteile Friedrichstadt und Wilsdruffer Vorstadt/Seevorstadt-West, vom Ortsamtsbereich Blasewitz der Stadtteil Striesen-Süd mit Johannstadt-Südost, vom Ortsamtsbereich Neustadt der Stadtteil Innere Neustadt mit Antonstadt-Süd und Leipziger Vorstadt und vom Ortsamtsbereich Prohlis der Stadtteil Strehlen	62.988	62.196
46	Dresden 6	von der Stadt Dresden der Ortsamtsbereich Cotta ohne den Stadtteil Cotta mit Friedrichstadt-Südwest und die Ortschaften Altfranken, Cossebaude, Gompitz, Mobschatz und Oberwartha	58.404	57.807
47	Dresden 7	von der Stadt Dresden (Stadtbezirk Pieschen, vom Stadtbezirk Altstadt die statistischen Stadtteile Friedrichstadt und Wilsdruffer Vorstadt/Seevorstadt-West, vom Stadtbezirk Cotta der statistische Stadtteil Cotta mit Friedrichstadt-Südwest der kreisfreien Stadt Dresden)	62.501	63.578
48	Sächsische Schweiz-Osterzgebirge 1	Städte: Freital, Tharandt, Wilsdruff Gemeinde: Dorfhain im Landkreis Sächsische Schweiz-Osterzgebirge	49.336	48.772
49	Sächsische Schweiz-Osterzgebirge 2	Städte: Altenberg, Dippoldiswalde, Glashütte, Rabenau Gemeinden: Bannewitz, Hartmannsdorf-Reichenau, Hermsdorf/Erzgeb., Klingenberg, Kreischa, Schmiedeberg im Landkreis Sächsische Schweiz-Osterzgebirge	48.172	46.908
50	Sächsische Schweiz-Osterzgebirge 3	Städte: Bad Gottleuba-Berggießhübel, Dohna, Heidenau, Liebstadt, Pirna Gemeinden: Bahretal, Dohma, Müglitztal im Landkreis Sächsische Schweiz-Osterzgebirge	61.649	60.717
51	Sächsische Schweiz-Osterzgebirge 4	Städte: Bad Schandau, Hohnstein, Königstein/Sächs. Schw., Neustadt i. Sa., Sebnitz, Stadt Wehlen, Stolpen Gemeinden: Dürrröhrsdorf-Dittersbach, Gohrisch, Lohmen, Rathen, Rathmannsdorf, Reinhardtsdorf-Schöna, Rosenthal-Bielatal, Struppen im Landkreis Sächsische Schweiz-Osterzgebirge	47.032	44.830
52	Bautzen 1	Städte: Bischofswerda, Schirgiswalde-Kirschau, Wilthen Gemeinden: Burkau, Cunewalde, Demitz-Thumitz, Frankenthal, Göda, Großharthau, Großpostwitz, Neukirch, Obergurig, Rammenau, Schmölln-Putzkau, Sohland, Steinigtwolmsdorf im Landkreis Bautzen	54.852	52.257
53	Bautzen 2	Städte: Elstra, Großröhrsdorf, Kamenz, Pulsnitz Gemeinden: Arnsdorf, Bretnig-Hauswalde, Crostwitz, Großnaundorf, Haselbachtal, Lichtenberg, Nebelschütz, Ohorn, Panschwitz-Kuckau, Räckelwitz, Ralbitz-Rosenthal, Steina im Landkreis Bautzen	49.838	48.460
54	Bautzen 3	Städte: Bernsdorf, Königsbrück, Lauta, Radeberg, Wittichenau Gemeinden: Laußnitz, Neukirch, Oßling, Ottendorf-Okrilla, Schwepnitz, Wachau im Landkreis Bautzen	55.677	54.249
55	Bautzen 4	Stadt: Hoyerswerda Gemeinden: Elsterheide, Königswartha, Lohsa, Neschwitz, Puschwitz, Radibor, Spreetal im Landkreis Bautzen	48.005	44.803
56	Bautzen 5	Städte: Bautzen, Weißenberg Gemeinden: Doberschau-Gaußig, Großdubrau, Hochkirch, Kubschütz, Malschwitz im Landkreis Bautzen	51.155	48.832
57	Görlitz 1	Städte: Bad Muskau, Niesky, Rothenburg, Weißwasser Gemeinden: Boxberg, Gablenz, Groß Düben, Hähnichen, Hohendubrau, Horka, Kodersdorf, Krauschwitz, Kreba-Neudorf, Mücka, Neißeaue, Quitzdorf am See, Rietschen, Schleife, Schöpstal, Trebendorf, Waldhufen, Weißkeißel im Landkreis Görlitz	60.472	56.654
58	Görlitz 2	Städte: Görlitz, Reichenbach Gemeinden: Königshain, Markersdorf, Vierkirchen im Landkreis Görlitz	54.146	52.269
59	Görlitz 3	Städte: Bernstadt a. d. Eigen, Ebersbach-Neugersdorf, Herrnhut, Löbau, Neusalza-Spremberg, Ostritz Gemeinden: Beiersdorf, Dürrhennersdorf, Großschweidnitz, Kottmar, Lawalde, Oppach, Rosenbach, Schönau-Berzdorf a. d. Eigen, Schönbach im Landkreis Görlitz	53.948	50.705
60	Görlitz 4	Städte: Seifhennersdorf, Zittau Gemeinden: Bertsdorf-Hörnitz, Großschönau, Hainewalde, Jonsdorf, Leutersdorf, Mittelherwigsdorf, Oderwitz, Olbersdorf, Oybin, im Landkreis Görlitz	51.692	48.538
		Gesamt	3.376.627	3.287.568

=== Constituencies used in 1994 and 1999 ===
The basis for this division was the Law on Elections to the Landtag of Saxony (SächsWahlg) of 5 August 1993. For the 1999 state elections, the boundaries of the state parliament constituencies were changed as a result of territorial reforms in Article 2 of the accompanying electoral law to the municipal boundary reform.
