= Reudnitz =

Reudnitz is the name of several places in Germany. It is of Slavic origin.

- a subdistrict of the South-East district of Leipzig, Saxony
- a district of Mohlsdorf-Teichwolframsdorf, Thuringia
- a district of Friedland, Brandenburg
- a district of Cavertitz, Saxony
