= Steinigtwolmsdorf =

- Municipality
- Location of Steinigtwolmsdorf within Bautzen district
- Interactive map of Steinigtwolmsdorf
- Location within Germany Location within Saxony
- Coordinates: 51°4′N 14°21′E
- Country: Germany
- State: Saxony
- District: Bautzen
- Subdivisions: 3

Government
  - Mayor (2020–27): Kathrin Gessel

Area
  - Total: 18.03 km^{2} (6.96 sq mi)
- Elevation: 394 m (1,293 ft)

Population (2025-12-31)
  - Total: 2,595
  - Density: 143.9/km^{2} (372.8/sq mi)
- Time zone: UTC+01:00 (CET)
  - Summer (DST): UTC+02:00 (CEST)
- Postal codes: 01904
- Dialling codes: 035951
- Vehicle registration: BZ, BIW, HY, KM
- Website: www.steinigtwolmsdorf.com

Steinigtwolmsdorf (German name; Upper Sorbian name: Wołbramecy) is a municipality of about 3,419 inhabitants. It is situated in eastern Germany in the district of Bautzen in Saxony near the border to the Czech Republic.

== Geography and transport ==
Steinigtwolmsdorf is in the southern part of the district of Bautzen. It is about 16 km apart from the city of Bischofswerda and about 19 km apart from the city of Bautzen. It is near the federal highway (Bundesstrasse) B98, that is between Bischofswerda, Oppach and Zittau. The next railway-station can be found in Neukirch/Lausitz at the railway-connection between Dresden and Liberec.

== Parts of the community ==
The community consists out of three parts: Steinigtwolmsdorf, Ringenhain and Weifa. The central village of the community has been founded in 1250. The most important sight is the church from 1861 and some Umgebindehäuser. In one part of the community called "Ringenhain" there can be found the smallest Umgebindehaus of the whole upper Lusatia. The small village of Weifa, the highest of all villages in whole upper Lusatia and also unique as being a free village since hundreds of years.
