= Bautzen 3/Budyšin 3 =

State electoral district of Germany

54: Bautzen 3/Budyšin 3
- Electoral district for the Landtag of Saxony
- Bautzen 3/Budyšin 3 in 2024
- District: Bautzen
- Electorate: 46,176 (2024)
- Major settlements: Bernsdorf, Königsbrück, Radeberg, and Wittichenau

Current electoral district
- Party: AfD
- Member: Timo Schreyer

Bautzen 3/Budyšin 3 is an electoral constituency (German: Wahlkreis) represented in the Landtag of Saxony. It elects one member via first-past-the-post voting. Under the constituency numbering system, it is designated as constituency 54. It is within the district of Bautzen.

== Geography ==
The constituency comprises the towns of Bernsdorf, Königsbrück, Radeberg, and Wittichenau, and the municipalities of Laußnitz, Neukirch, Oßling, Ottendorf-Okrilla, Schwepnitz, and Wachau within the district of Bautzen.

There were 46,176 eligible voters in 2024.

== Members ==
Election	Member	Party	%
2014	Stanislaw Tillich	CDU	57.2
2019	Timo Schreyer	AfD	31.9
2024	Timo Schreyer	AfD	39.2

== Election results ==
=== 2024 election ===
State election (2024): Bautzen 3/Budyšin 3
Notes:	Blue background denotes the winner of the electorate vote. Pink background denotes a candidate elected from their party list. Yellow background denotes an electorate win by a list member, or other incumbent. A ✓ or ✗ denotes status of any incumbent, win or lose respectively.						
Party	Candidate	Votes	%	±%	Party votes	%	±%
AfD	✓ Timo Schreyer	13,846	39.2	▲8.0	12,418	35.1	▲4.1
CDU	Thomas Jürgen Haink	13,032	36.9	▲4.8	11,947	33.8	▲1.0
BSW	Kathleen Liebschner	3,595	10.2		4,152	11.7	
SPD	Alex Detlef Scholze	1,682	4.8	▲0.2	2,019	5.7	▼0.8
Freie Sachsen					1,014	2.9	
FW	Marcel Linack	1,086	3.1	▼1.6	676	1.9	▼1.6
Left	Lydia Berger	998	2.8	▼5.4	732	2.1	▼5.5
Greens	Maria Barbara Untch	676	1.9	▼2.8	954	2.7	▼2.3
APT					358	1.0	
FDP	Kirstin Schiewart	393	1.1	▼13.4	343	1.0	▼7.3
PARTEI					233	0.7	▼0.5
BD					136	0.4	
Values					114	0.3	
Pirates					87	0.2	
dieBasis					63	0.2	
Bündnis C					47	0.1	
V-Partei3					41	0.1	
ÖDP					34	0.1	
BüSo					30	0.1	
Informal votes		392			302		
Total valid votes		35,308			35,398		
Turnout		35,700	77.3	▲7.4			
AfD hold	Majority	814	2.3				

=== 2019 election ===
State election (2019): Bautzen 3/Budyšin 3
Notes:	Blue background denotes the winner of the electorate vote. Pink background denotes a candidate elected from their party list. Yellow background denotes an electorate win by a list member, or other incumbent. A ✓ or ✗ denotes status of any incumbent, win or lose respectively.						
Party	Candidate	Votes	%	±%	Party votes	%	±%
AfD	Timo Schreyer	11,761	31.9		11,637	31.5	▲20.3
CDU	Mathias Kockert	11,605	31.5	▼25.7	11,925	32.3	▼10.5
FDP	Holger Zastrow	4,992	13.5	▲10.9	2,876	7.8	▲3.4
Left	Silvio Lang	3,143	8.5	▼6.5	2,892	7.8	▼8.0
FW	Marcel Linack	1,864	5.1	▲1.8	1,376	3.7	▲1.5
Greens	Jens Bitzka	1,770	4.8	▲1.4	1,798	4.9	▲1.0
SPD	André Dubiel-Umlauft	1,710	4.6	▼5.5	2,416	6.5	▼4.8
APT					514	1.4	▲1.0
PARTEI					418	1.1	▲0.5
NPD					249	0.7	▼4.5
Verjüngungsforschung					241	0.7	
The Blue Party					138	0.4	
ÖDP					131	0.4	
Pirates					122	0.3	▼0.7
Awakening of German Patriots - Central Germany					61	0.2	
Humanists					49	0.1	
PDV					42	0.1	
DKP					30	0.1	
BüSo					24	0.1	▼0.1
Informal votes		487			393		
Total valid votes		36,845			36,939		
Turnout		37,332	68.8	▲15.1			
AfD gain from CDU	Majority	156	0.4				

=== 2014 election ===
State election (2014): Bautzen 3
Notes:	Blue background denotes the winner of the electorate vote. Pink background denotes a candidate elected from their party list. Yellow background denotes an electorate win by a list member, or other incumbent. A ✓ or ✗ denotes status of any incumbent, win or lose respectively.						
Party	Candidate	Votes	%	±%	Party votes	%	±%
CDU	Stanislaw Tillich	16,850	57.2		12,598	42.8	
Left		4,416	15.0		4,650	15.8	
AfD					3,287	11.2	
SPD		2,969	10.1		3,340	11.3	
NPD		1,728	5.9		1,546	5.2	
Greens		1,007	3.4		1,144	3.9	
FW		983	3.3		662	2.2	
FDP		780	2.6		1,292	4.4	
Pirates		488	1.7		308	1.0	
APT					297	1.0	
PARTEI					164	0.6	
BüSo		214	0.7		68	0.2	
Pro Germany Citizens' Movement					65	0.2	
DSU					45	0.2	
Informal votes		449			418		
Total valid votes		29,435			29,466		
Turnout		29,884	53.7	▼2.8			
CDU win new seat	Majority	12,434	42.2				

== See also ==
- Politics of Saxony
- Landtag of Saxony
