= Zwickau 3 =

State electoral district of Germany

6: Zwickau 3
- Electoral district for the Landtag of Saxony
- Zwickau 3 in 2024
- District: Zwickau
- Electorate: 54,753 (2024)
- Major settlements: Centre, East, North and South of the City of Zwickau

Current electoral district
- Party: AfD
- Member: Jonas Dünzel

Zwickau 3 is an electoral constituency (German: Wahlkreis) represented in the Landtag of Saxony. It elects one member via first-past-the-post voting. Under the constituency numbering system, it is designated as constituency 6. It is within the district of Zwickau.

== Geography ==
The constituency includes the centre, East, North and South of the City of Zwickau within Zwickau.

There were 54,753 eligible voters in 2024

== Members ==
Election	Member	Party	%
2014	Gerald Otto	CDU	38.0
2019	Gerald Otto	CDU	32.1
2024	Jonas Dünzel	AfD	36.7

== Election results ==
=== 2024 election ===
State election (2024): Zwickau 3
Notes:	Blue background denotes the winner of the electorate vote. Pink background denotes a candidate elected from their party list. Yellow background denotes an electorate win by a list member, or other incumbent. A ✓ or ✗ denotes status of any incumbent, win or lose respectively.						
Party	Candidate	Votes	%	±%	Party votes	%	±%
AfD	Jonas Dünzel	13,642	36.7	▲6.7	12,156	32.5	▼1.0
CDU	✗ Gerald Otto	12,732	34.3	▲2.1	12,122	32.5	▼1.0
BSW	Sven Quilitzsch	4,712	12.7		5,735	15.4	
SPD	Kay Leonhardt	1,800	4.8	▼0.7	2,326	6.2	▼1.4
Left	René Hahn	1,539	4.1	▼10.1	1,053	2.8	▼8.7
FW	Christiane Drechsel	1,464	3.9	▼0.7	652	1.7	▼0.3
Greens	Manuel Schramm	683	1.8	▼5.4	923	2.5	▼3.7
Freie Sachsen					775	2.1	
APT					445	1.2	
FDP	Stefan Voigt	584	1.6	▼4.6	278	0.7	▼3.5
PARTEI					269	0.7	▼0.7
Bündnis C					129	0.3	
Values					110	0.3	
BD					92	0.2	
dieBasis					70	0.2	
Pirates					62	0.2	
V-Partei3					38	0.1	
BüSo					24	0.1	
ÖDP					62	0.2	
Informal votes		471			344		
Total valid votes		37,156			37,283		
Turnout		37,627	68.7	▲8.2			
AfD gain from CDU	Majority	910	2.4				

=== 2019 election ===
State election (2019): Zwickau 3
Notes:	Blue background denotes the winner of the electorate vote. Pink background denotes a candidate elected from their party list. Yellow background denotes an electorate win by a list member, or other incumbent. A ✓ or ✗ denotes status of any incumbent, win or lose respectively.						
Party	Candidate	Votes	%	±%	Party votes	%	±%
CDU	✓ Gerald Otto	11,030	32.1	▼5.9	11,539	33.5	▼6.5
AfD		10,302	30.0	▲20.5	9,889	28.7	▲19.4
Left		4,875	14.2	▼9.1	3,969	11.5	▼10.4
Greens		2,500	7.3	▲1.9	2,143	6.2	▲2.0
FDP		2,118	6.2	▲3.0	1,470	4.3	▲1.1
SPD		1,902	5.5	▼7.8	2,632	7.6	▼5.5
APT					799	2.3	▲1.2
FW		1,603	4.7	▲2.8	702	2.0	▲0.9
PARTEI					483	1.4	▲0.8
Verjüngungsforschung					179	0.5	
The Blue Party					154	0.4	
Awakening of German Patriots - Central Germany					128	0.4	
NPD					117	0.3	▼4.0
Pirates					66	0.2	▼0.6
ÖDP					60	0.2	
Humanists					43	0.1	
DKP					30	0.1	
PDV					23	0.1	
BüSo					19	0.1	▼0.2
Informal votes		460			345		
Total valid votes		34,330			34,445		
Turnout		34,790	58.8	▲19.7			
CDU hold	Majority	728	2.1	▼12.6			

=== 2014 election ===
State election (2014): Zwickau 3
Notes:	Blue background denotes the winner of the electorate vote. Pink background denotes a candidate elected from their party list. Yellow background denotes an electorate win by a list member, or other incumbent. A ✓ or ✗ denotes status of any incumbent, win or lose respectively.						
Party	Candidate	Votes	%	±%	Party votes	%	±%
CDU	Gerald Otto	9,182	38.0		9,723	40.0	
Left		5,629	23.3		5,317	21.9	
SPD		3,211	13.3		3,173	13.1	
AfD		2,298	9.5		2,247	9.3	
Greens		1,311	5.4		1,014	4.2	
NPD		909	3.8		1,040	4.3	
FDP		762	3.2		774	3.2	
APT					274	1.1	
FW		462	1.9		264	1.1	
Pirates		268	1.1		192	0.8	
PARTEI					134	0.6	
BüSo		157	0.6		75	0.3	
Pro Germany Citizens' Movement					29	0.1	
DSU					24	0.1	
Informal votes		418			327		
Total valid votes		24,189			24,280		
Turnout		24,607	39.1	▼12.8			
CDU win new seat	Majority	3,553	14.7				

== See also ==
- Politics of Saxony
- Landtag of Saxony
