= Ellefeld =

- Municipality
- Coat of arms

- Location of Ellefeld within Vogtlandkreis district
- Interactive map of Ellefeld
- Location within Germany Location within Saxony
- Coordinates: 50°29′N 12°24′E
- Country: Germany
- State: Saxony
- District: Vogtlandkreis

Government
  - Mayor (2020–27): Jörg Kerber

Area
  - Total: 4.55 km^{2} (1.76 sq mi)
- Elevation: 504 m (1,654 ft)

Population (2025-12-31)
  - Total: 2,350
  - Density: 516/km^{2} (1,340/sq mi)
- Time zone: UTC+01:00 (CET)
  - Summer (DST): UTC+02:00 (CEST)
- Postal codes: 08236
- Dialling codes: 03745
- Vehicle registration: V
- Website: www.ellefeld.de

Ellefeld is a municipality in the Vogtlandkreis district in Saxony, Germany.

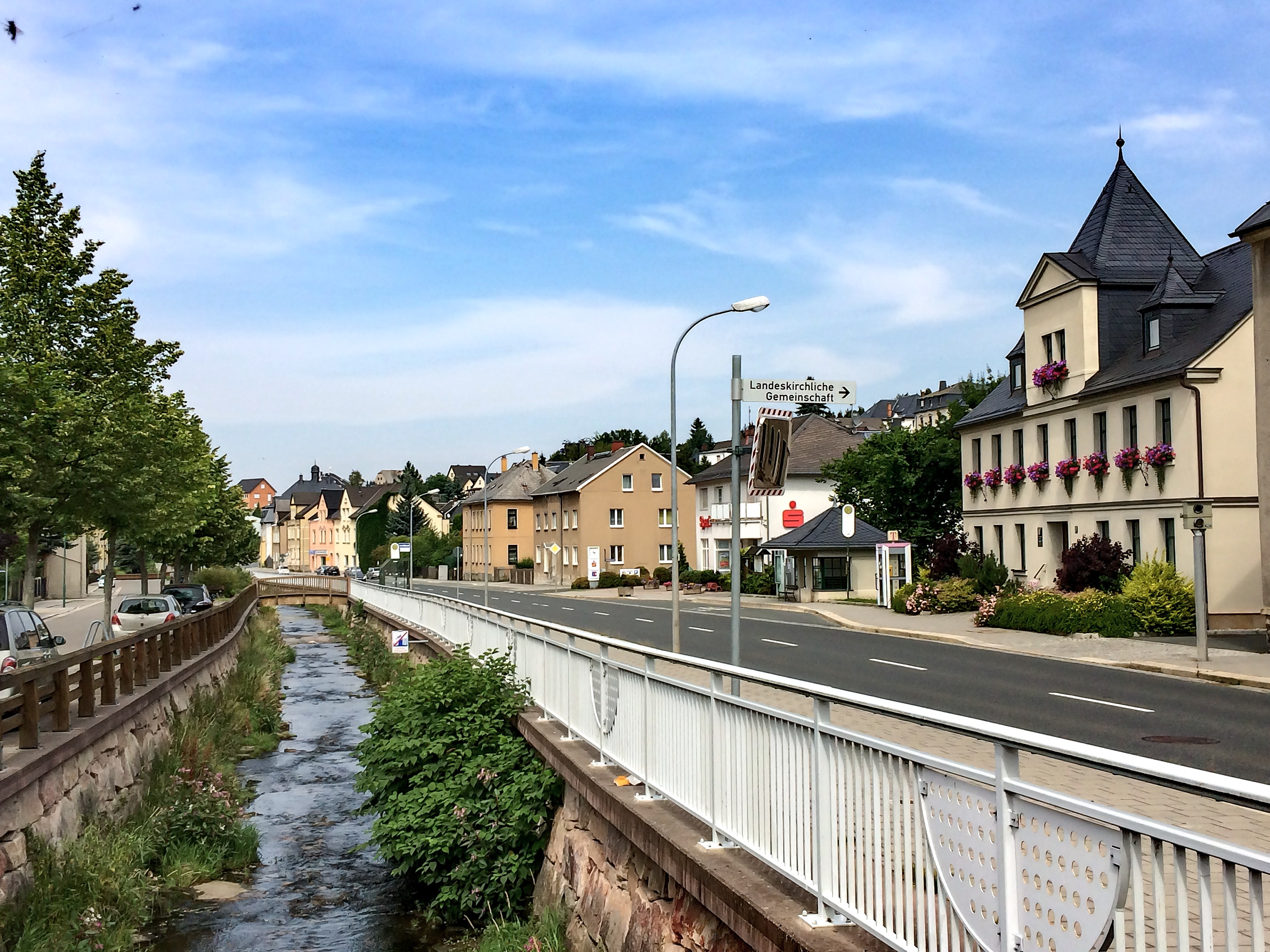
Ellefeld city center

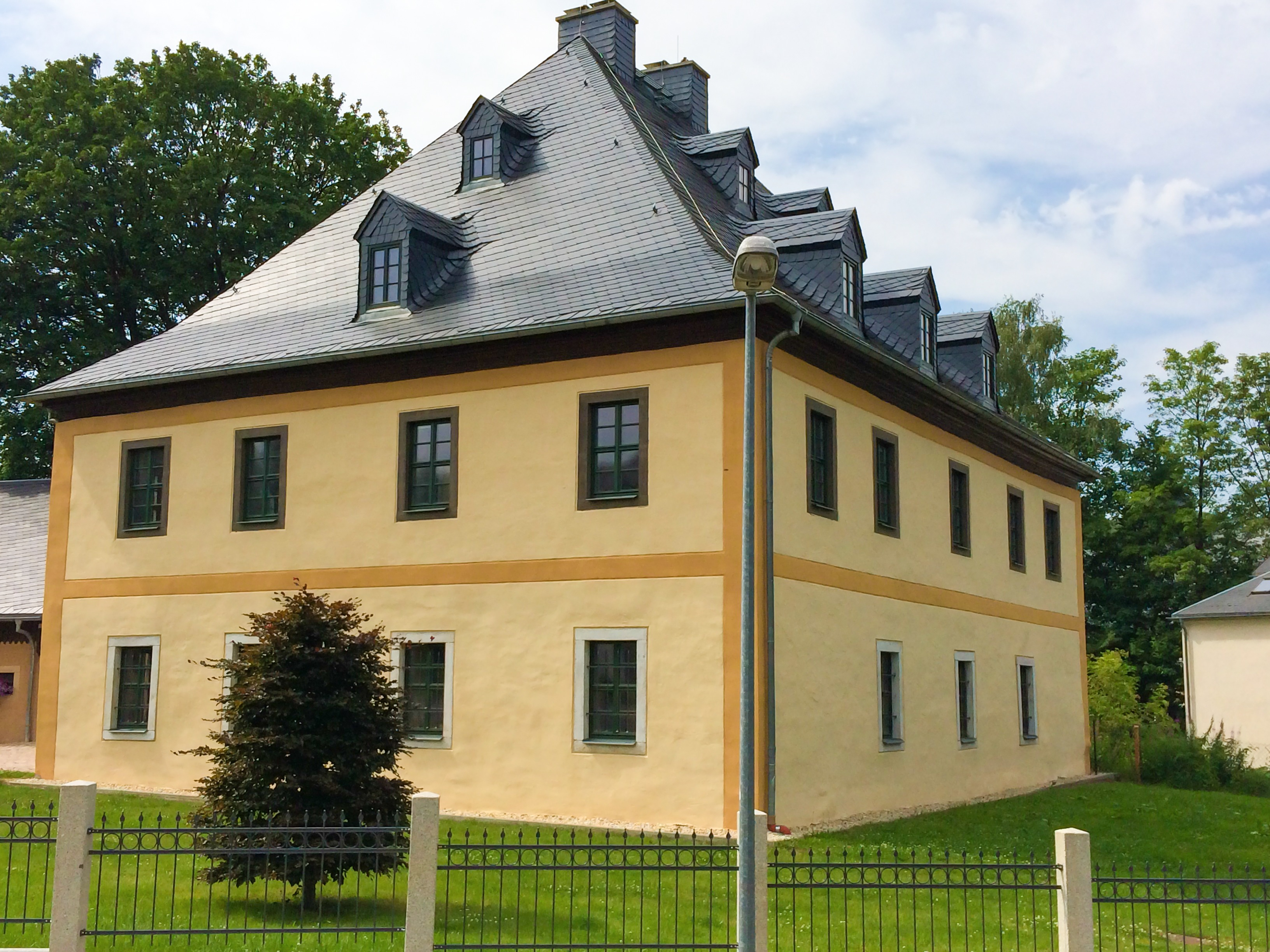
Historic building

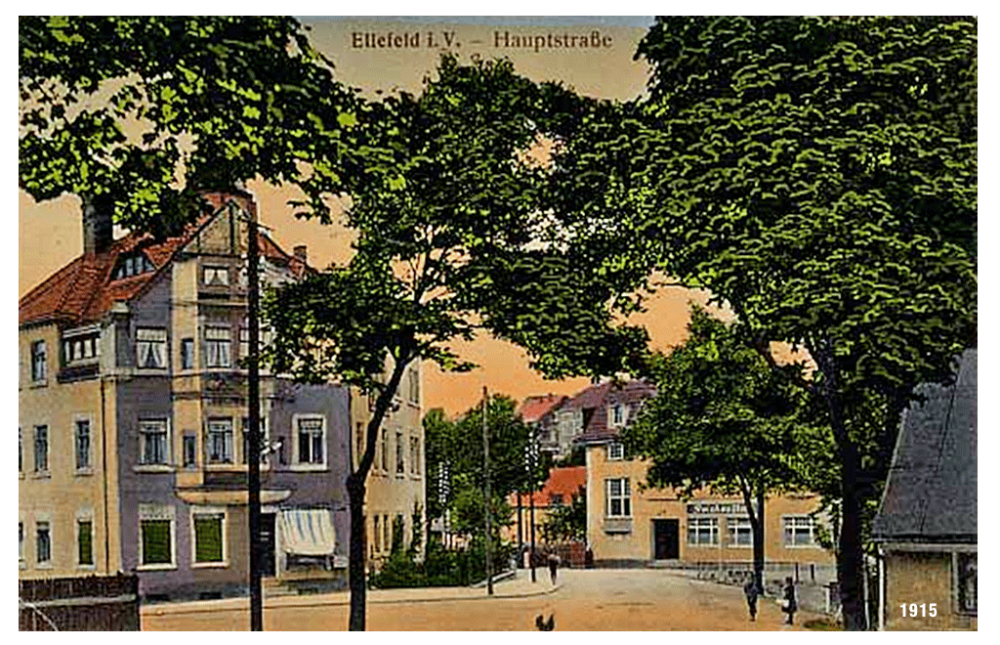
Ellefeld in 1915
