= Diera-Zehren =

- Municipality
- Coat of arms

- Location of Diera-Zehren within Meißen district
- Interactive map of Diera-Zehren
- Location within Germany Location within Saxony
- Coordinates: 51°12′N 13°26′E
- Country: Germany
- State: Saxony
- District: Meißen

Government
  - Mayor (2018–25): Carola Balk

Area
  - Total: 43.20 km^{2} (16.68 sq mi)
- Elevation: 157 m (515 ft)

Population (2025-12-31)
  - Total: 3,174
  - Density: 73.47/km^{2} (190.3/sq mi)
- Time zone: UTC+01:00 (CET)
  - Summer (DST): UTC+02:00 (CEST)
- Postal codes: 01665
- Dialling codes: 035267, 035247
- Vehicle registration: MEI, GRH, RG, RIE
- Website: www.diera-zehren.de

Diera-Zehren is a municipality in the district of Meißen, in Saxony, Germany.
