= Chemnitz-Kaßberg =

Neighborhood in Chemnitz, Saxony, Germany

Coordinates: 50.8333°N 12.9028°E

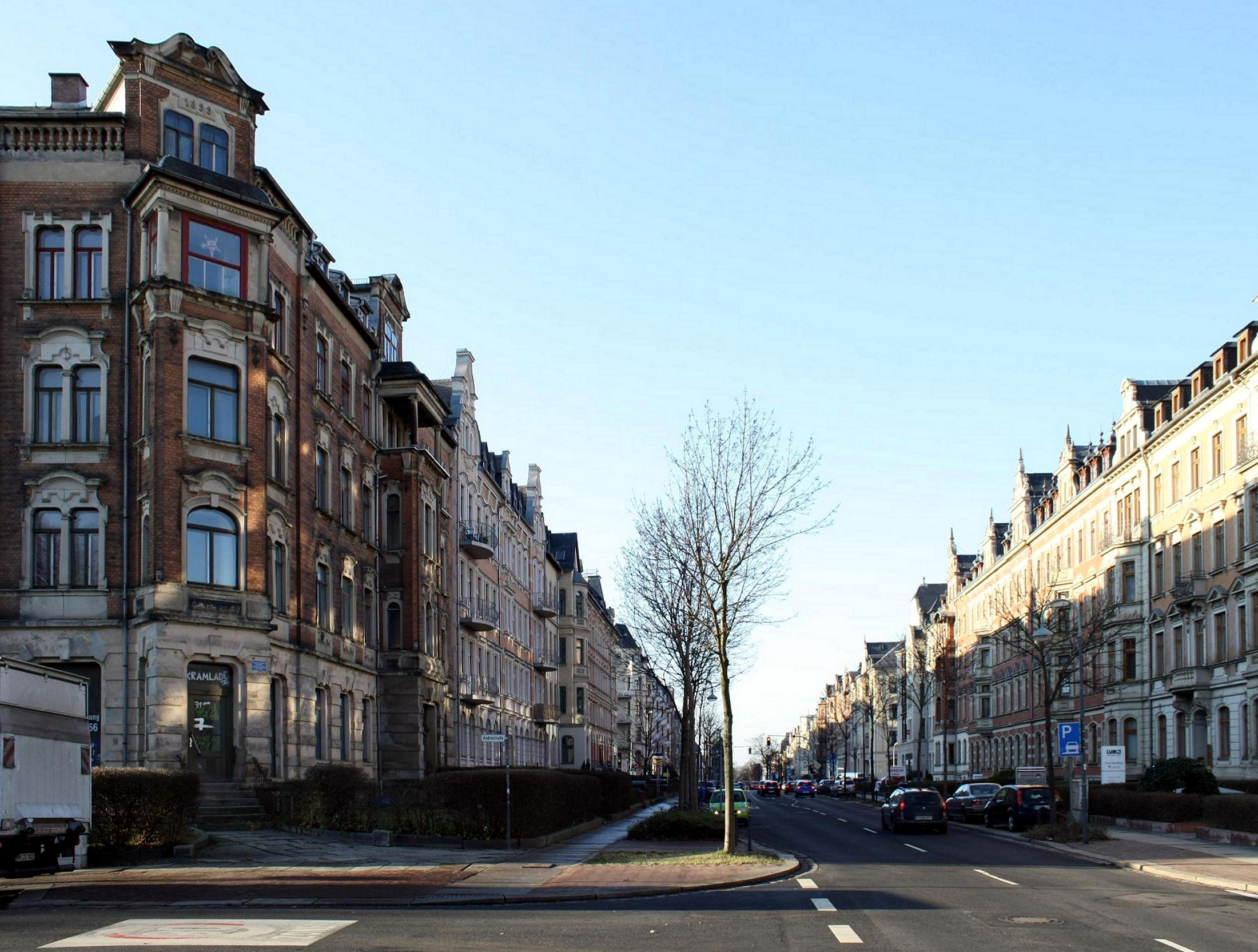
The "Weststraße"

Kaßberg is the most densely populated neighbourhood within the German city of Chemnitz (the third largest city in the state of Saxony) and belongs to the largest Gründerzeit and Art Nouveau neighbourhoods in Germany. It is near the Chemnitz River and is to the west of the Chemnitz city centre. Its highest point is about 30 metres above the level of the city centre.

== History ==
Until the middle of the 19th century, Katzberg (Cat Hill), as it was then called, had only been settled around its edges. But vaulted cellars for storing the beer, which had been brewed in Chemnitz, had been dug into the cliffs already at the start of the 16th century. In the course of the centuries, a highly complex network of cellar entrances came about, some of which can still be viewed in guided tours.

It was only in 1855 that teacher Johann Friedrich Stahlknecht, of Chemnitz, built the first house on Kaßberg (on the property, which was bordered by the later-named "Hohe Straße" (High Street). As the area at that time had still been very much closed off, that decision had been seen as audacious, which is why the builder had planned the house with the four-sided inscription "Ich hab’s gewagt“ (I dared to do it). Afterward, Stahlknecht reported the advantages of his living situation in various articles in a Chemnitz daily newspaper and thus draw in new developers.

With oncoming Industrialisation also came the development and construction in Kaßberg. The height of the hill was quickly seen as an advantage of the neighborhood, especially as the air pollution was less intense there than elsewhere in the city. A characteristic of the area of about two square kilometers, which was primarily developed between 1870 and 1930, is the gridded street system, which was planned according to the topography, in that the streets were laid parallel or at right angles to the slopes of the hill. Kaiser, Stephan, Wieland and André squares were inserted as green spaces within the street grid. Companies did businesses on the edges of Kaßberg, such as Sächsische Maschinenfabrik (Machine Factory of Saxony), the Maschinenfabrik Germania (Machine Factory of Germania), Union and C. G. Haubold, Tresorfabrik Baum (safe box factory), Presto-Werke, Textilfabrik der Brüder Goeritz (textile factory), among others. Even the city administration set up numerous operations, including the Königliche Amts- und Landesgericht (Royal Administrative and State Court), the Königliche Steuerbehörde (the Royal Tax Office), the Kaiserliche Oberpostdirektion (the Imperial Postal Directorate), the Königliche Gefangenenanstalt (the Royal Prison), the Königliche Gymnasium (the Royal Preparatory School), and the Oberrealschule (the Secondary School).

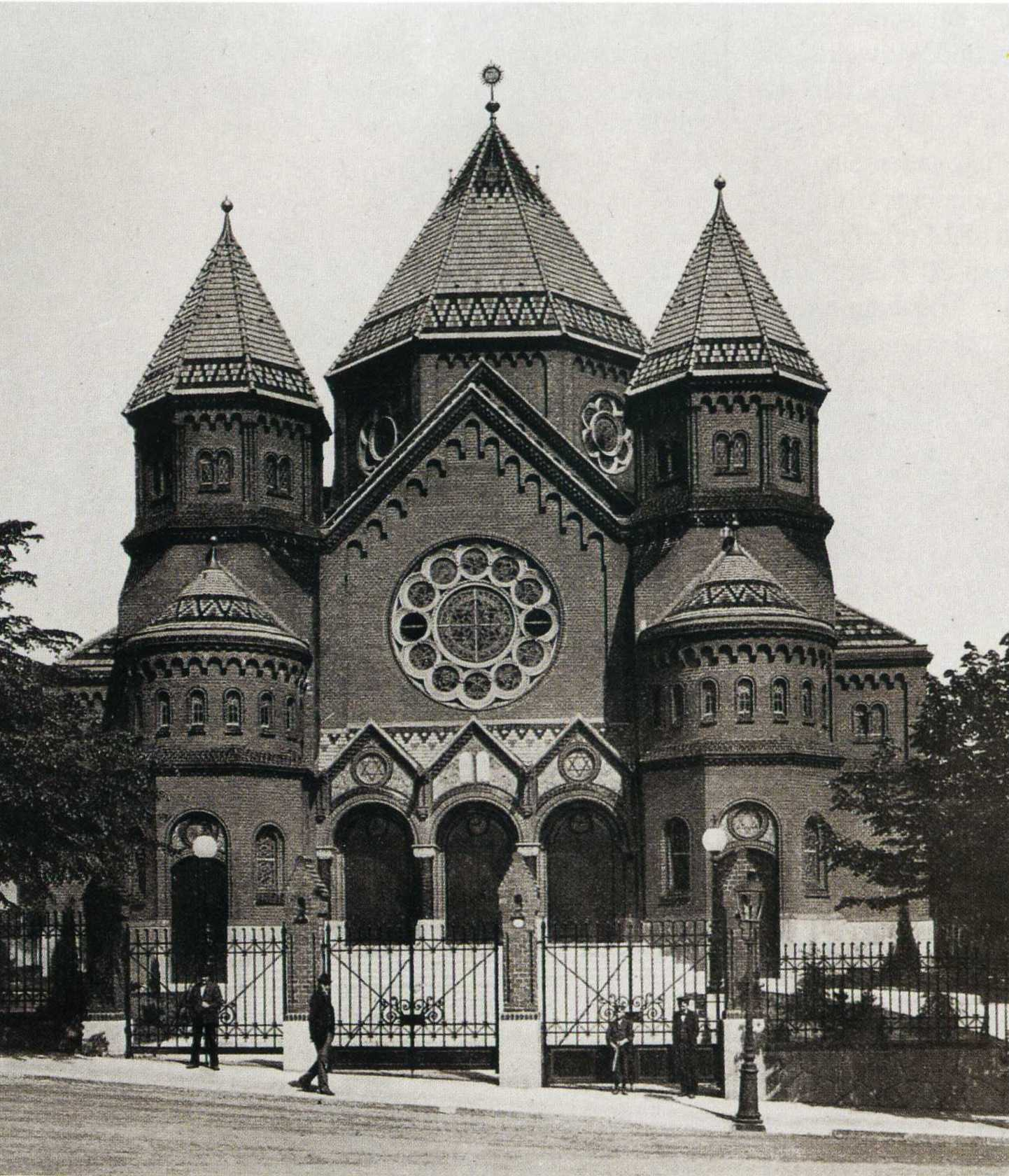
The only synagoge at Stephanplatz, Chemnitz (1900)

The only synagoge in Chemnitz, built between 1897 and 1899, as designed by architect Wenzel Bürger, and set on fire on Kristallnacht, was located at Stephan Square, until it was destroyed in 1939 under German National Socialism. The Central Theater of Chemnitz, opened in 1902 on Zwickauer Straße (Zwickau Street) was a prominent stage as a music hall, above all, until it was destroyed in 1945.

Kaßberg has been under protection as a heritage area since February 1991, which includes about 480 architectural works, mostly multi-storied residential buildings, municipal administrative buildings and school buildings of the Historicism, Art Nouveau and New Objectivity varieties.

== Transportation ==
Kaßberg is connected and served by bus lines 31, 32, 62, 72, 82 as well as night service bus N17, line 1 of the network of Trams in Chemnitz, which connects Kaßberg to the southern part of the city.

== Famous Personalities ==
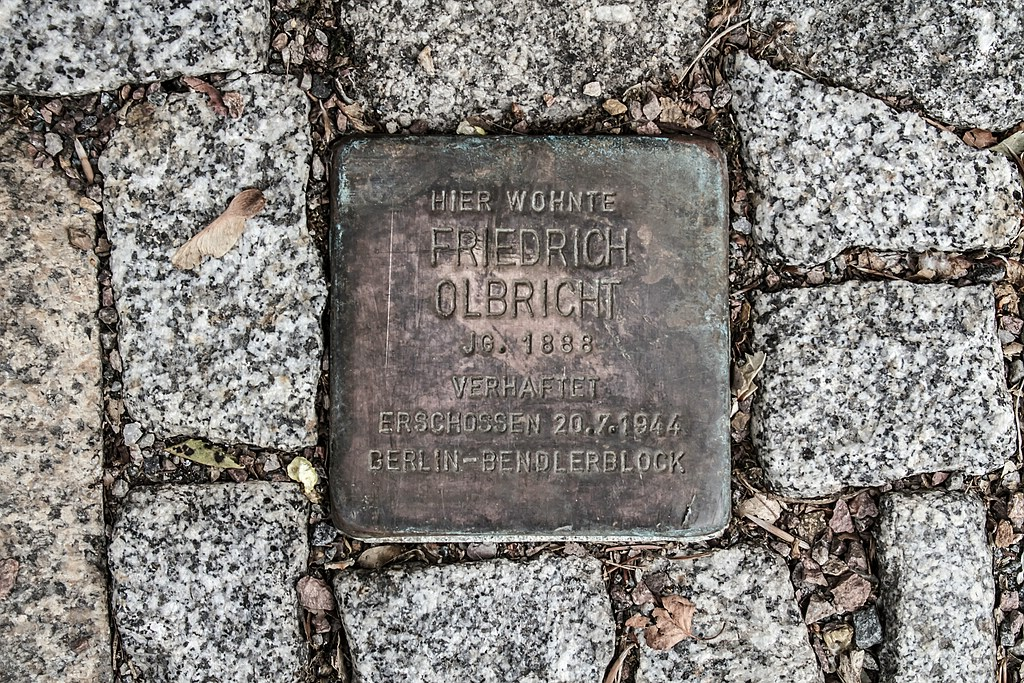
Stolperstein for Friedrich Olbricht

For at least part of their lives, the following people have resided in Kaßberg: Adolf Ferdinand Weinhold, Herbert Eugen Esche, Fred Otto, Helmut Flieg a.k.a. Stefan Heym, Rudolf Leder a.k.a. Stephan Hermlin, Lothar-Günther Buchheim, Marianne Brandt (artist), Martha Schrag, Hanna Klose-Greger, Otto Th. W. Stein, Fritz Heckert, Peter von Zahn, Walter Janka, Alexander Gauland, Carl Heumann, Bruni Löbel, Rolf Schneider (author), Wolfgang Emmerich, Barbara Köhler, Kerstin Hensel, Minni Herzing, Thomas Merkel, Heinrich Gustav Beck, among others.

== Reading List ==
- Tilo Richter (Hrsg.): Der Kaßberg. Ein Chemnitzer Lese- und Bilderbuch. Passage-Verlag, Leipzig 1996, ISBN 3-9805299-0-8.
- Werner Ballarin, Jörn Richter (Hrsg.): Faszination Kaßberg. Chemnitz 2005, ISBN 3-910186-53-X.
- Tilo Richter: Das Nobelviertel als Flächendenkmal: Zur Baugeschichte des Chemnitzer Kaßbergs. In: Dr.-Wilhelm-André-Gymnasium – 100 Jahre Schule auf dem Kaßberg. Verlag Heimatland Sachsen, Chemnitz 2008, ISBN 978-3-910186-70-5, S. 16–19.
