= Obergurig =

Obergurig/Hornja Hórka
- Municipality
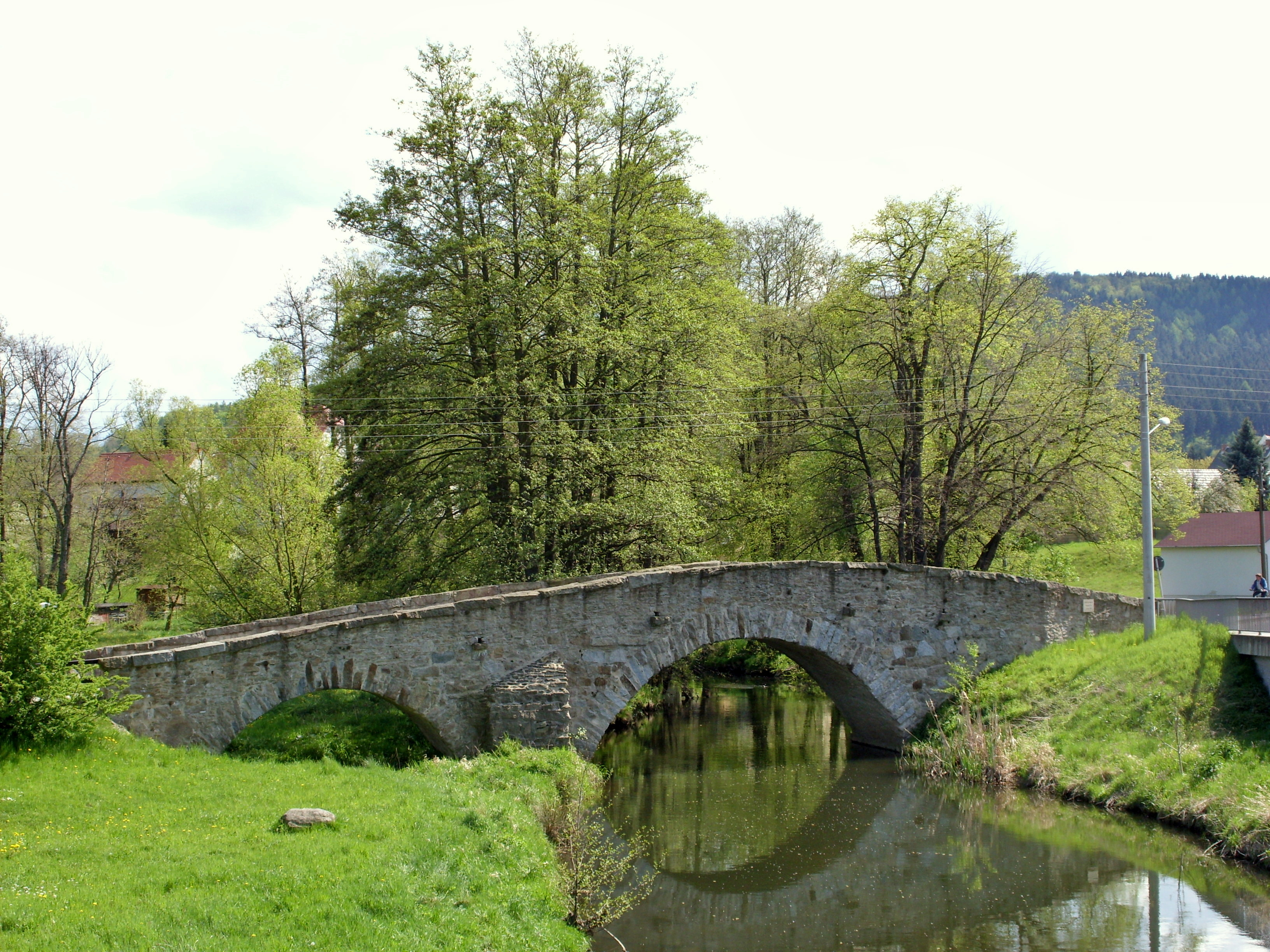

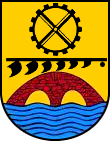
- Coat of arms

- Location of Obergurig/Hornja Hórka within Bautzen district
- Interactive map of Obergurig/Hornja Hórka
- Location within Germany Location within Saxony
- Coordinates: 51°08′N 14°24′E
- Country: Germany
- State: Saxony
- District: Bautzen
- Subdivisions: 7

Government
  - Mayor (2021–28): Thomas Polpitz

Area
  - Total: 9.84 km^{2} (3.80 sq mi)
- Elevation: 240 m (790 ft)

Population (2025-12-31)
  - Total: 2,016
  - Density: 205/km^{2} (531/sq mi)
- Demonym(s): German: Oberguriger; Upper Sorbian: Hornjohórčan (m.), Hornjohórčanka (f.)
- Time zone: UTC+01:00 (CET)
  - Summer (DST): UTC+02:00 (CEST)
- Postal codes: 02692
- Dialling codes: 035938
- Vehicle registration: BZ, BIW, HY, KM
- Website: www.obergurig.de

Obergurig (German) or Hornja Hórka (Upper Sorbian, pronounced [ˈhɔʁnʲa ˈhʊʁka]) is a municipality in the district of Bautzen, in Saxony, Germany.

The municipality is part of the recognized Sorbian settlement area in Saxony. Upper Sorbian has an official status next to German, all villages bear names in both languages.

The following villages belong to the municipality (names in German and Upper Sorbian):

- Singwitz/Dźěžnikecy
- Mönchswalde/Mnišonc
- Lehn/Lejno
- Schwarznaußlitz/Čorne Noslicy
- Großdöbschütz/Debsecy
- Kleindöbschütz/Małe Debsecy
