= Limbach, Vogtland =

Limbach
- Municipality
- Coat of arms

- Location of Limbach within Vogtlandkreis district
- Interactive map of Limbach
- Location within Germany Location within Saxony
- Coordinates: 50°35′2″N 12°15′10″E
- Country: Germany
- State: Saxony
- District: Vogtlandkreis

Government
  - Mayor (2022–29): Jens Göbel

Area
  - Total: 14.21 km^{2} (5.49 sq mi)
- Elevation: 400 m (1,300 ft)

Population (2025-12-31)
  - Total: 1,374
  - Density: 96.69/km^{2} (250.4/sq mi)
- Time zone: UTC+01:00 (CET)
  - Summer (DST): UTC+02:00 (CEST)
- Postal codes: 08491
- Dialling codes: 03765
- Vehicle registration: V, AE, OVL, PL, RC

Limbach (German pronunciation: [ˈlɪmbax]) is a municipality in the Vogtlandkreis district, in Saxony, Germany.
