= Seehausen, Leipzig =

District in Leipzig, Germany

Seehausen
- Stadtteil of Leipzig
- Interactive map of Seehausen
- Location within Germany Location within Saxony
- Country: Germany
- State: Saxony
- District: Urban district
- City: Leipzig

Area
  - Total: 18.86 km^{2} (7.28 sq mi)

Population (2024-12-31)
  - Total: 2,835
  - Density: 150.3/km^{2} (389.3/sq mi)
- Time zone: UTC+01:00 (CET)
  - Summer (DST): UTC+02:00 (CEST)
- Postal codes: 04356
- Dialling codes: 0341

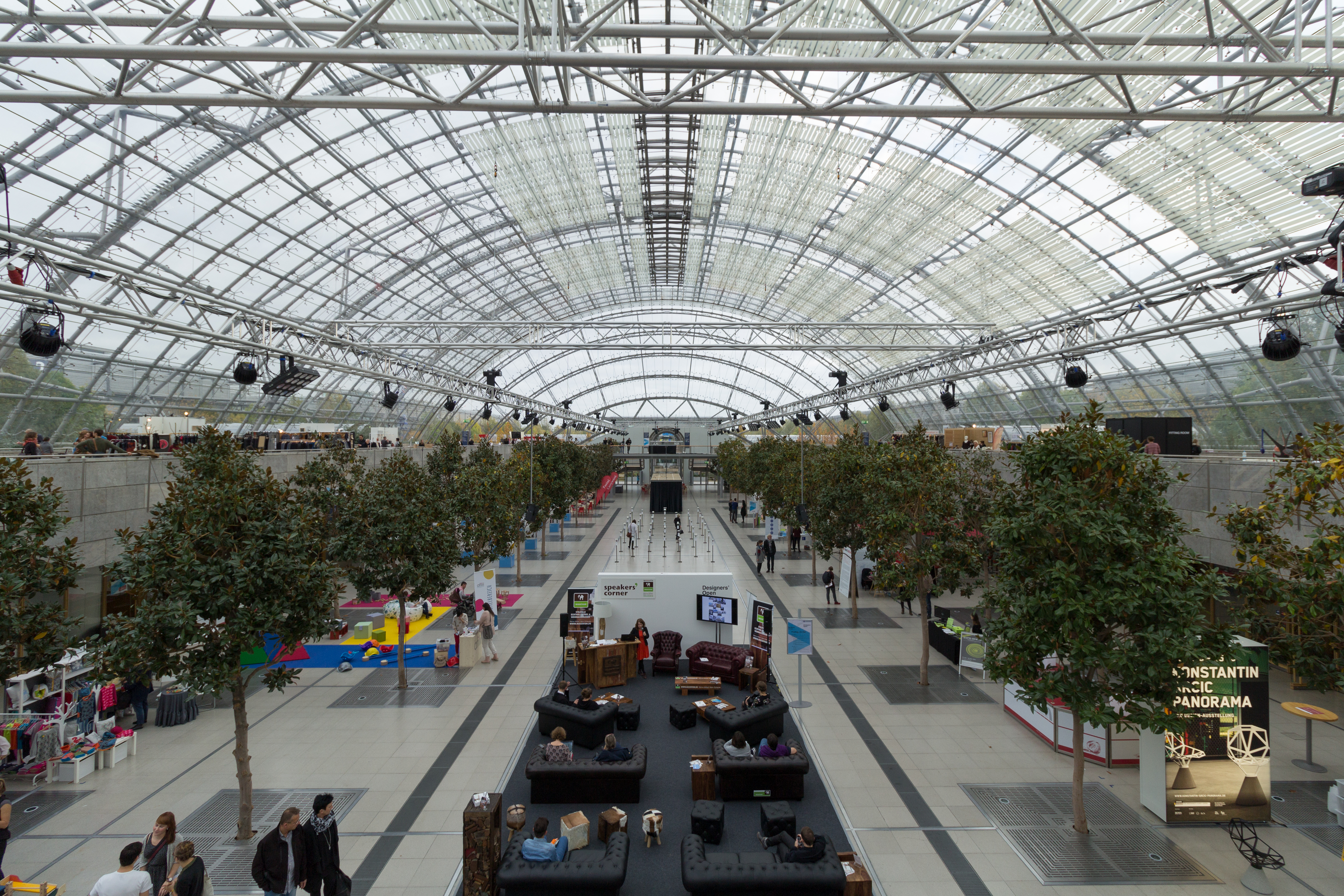
Leipzig Trade Fair

Seehausen (German pronunciation: [ˈzeːhaʊzn̩]) is a northern district of Leipzig in Germany. In its district lies the new fairgrounds for the city. Including its villages and hamlets, Seehausen has 1967 residents (1997). The district includes the village with the land on which the new Leipzig fairgrounds and exhibition grounds are located (known as Sachsenpark), and the hamlets of Göbschelwitz, Hohenheida, Gottscheina and Neblitz.

== History ==
The village was probably settled around 1150. In 1359 the village first appears in documents as Sehusen, and around this time, the farmers of the village declared their obligations to the city of Leipzig. In 1438, Frederick II, Elector of Saxony appointed Conrad Bruser as liege lord for Seehausen. In 1551 22 farmers owned land, and lived in the village; village residents also included nine men who owned no land. By 1580, the residents had built a school. In 1631, during the Thirty Years War, Seehausen was the site of a major battle, the Battle of Breitenfeld (1631). In 1791, many of the properties in Seehausen were destroyed in a fire.

== The Church ==
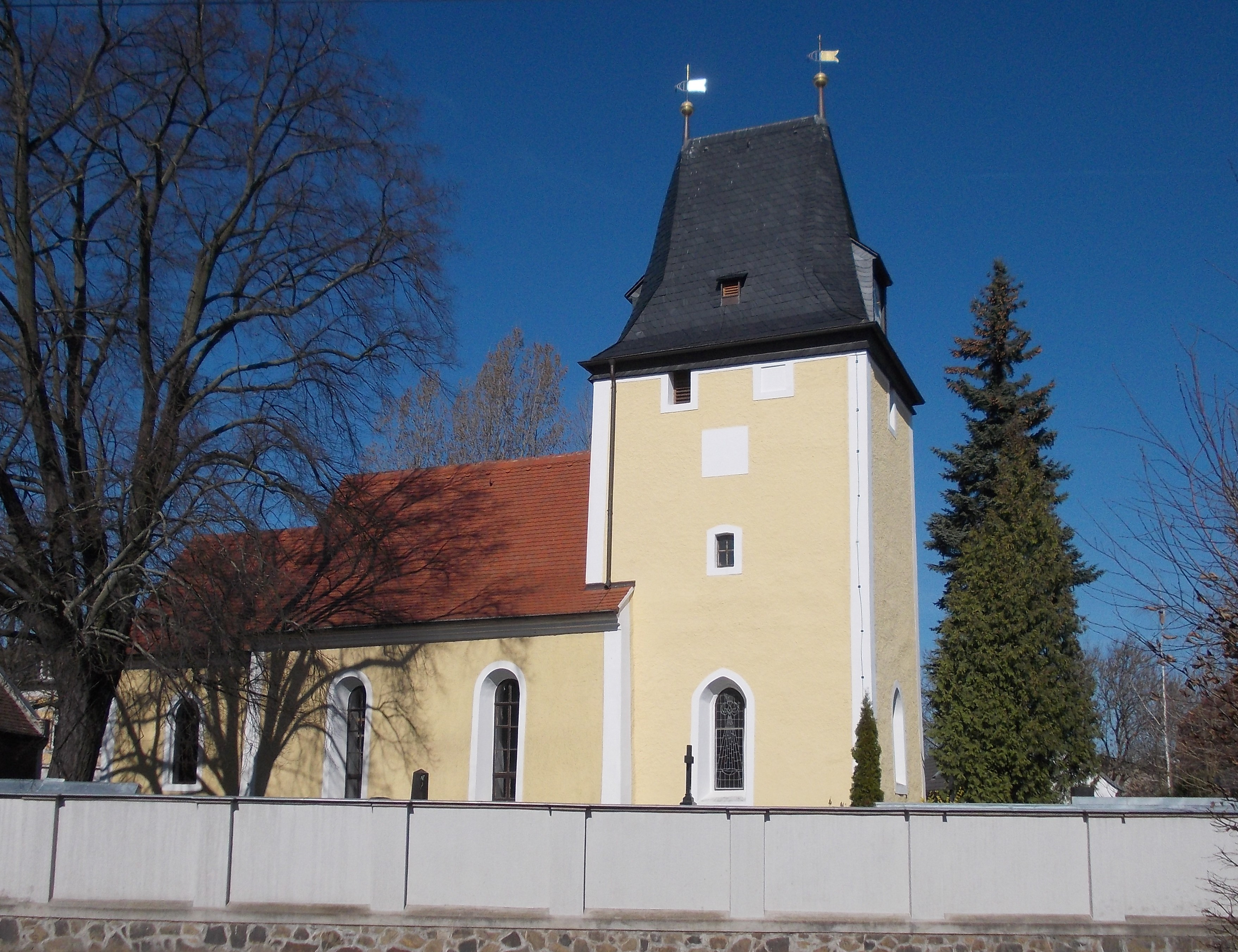
Evangelical Church in Seehausen, Leipzig

The Duchy of Saxony underwent The Reformation in 1539 and Seehausen became Protestant. The first church was built in the 13th century, in the romanesque Choir tower. In 1560, the parish property, with all its buildings, acres and garden was sold for 150 guilder to the farmer George Dyme. The church was further renovated in 1663 for 174 Thalers. Around the 15th century, the church was renovated, by increasing the height of the tiny Romanesque windows in the Gothic style. The church also received a new altar. In 1770, the church underwent another renovation, particularly in the interior, and the coat of arms of the lordship was installed on the altar at the dedication. In 1764, the village had 29 residents who owned property, and 9 residents without property. In 1788, the residents endowed the church with an organ.

== Terrain and Borders ==
Seehausen lies on a plain of approximately 18 km^{2}. Several streams run through the plain, primarily the Parthe, which originates in Elster and runs to the Elbe.

Seehausen is bordered in the north on Zschölkau, Krostitz und Mutschlena, in the east on Liemehna, Pönitz and Merkwitz, and Plaußig, Thekla and Mockau, and in the south and west on Wiederitzsch and Podelwitz.

In the center of Seehausen is the little church and a volunteer fire department. There is also an elementary school that is used also as a day-care center and a gymnasium. The area is also widely known in Leipzig for its golf course.
