= Triebel =

- Municipality
- Coat of arms

- Location of Triebel within Vogtlandkreis district
- Interactive map of Triebel
- Location within Germany Location within Saxony
- Coordinates: 50°21′N 12°8′E
- Country: Germany
- State: Saxony
- District: Vogtlandkreis
- Subdivisions: 17

Government
  - Mayor (2022–29): Udo Seeger

Area
  - Total: 43.09 km^{2} (16.64 sq mi)
- Elevation: 500 m (1,600 ft)

Population (2025-12-31)
  - Total: 1,114
  - Density: 25.85/km^{2} (66.96/sq mi)
- Time zone: UTC+01:00 (CET)
  - Summer (DST): UTC+02:00 (CEST)
- Postal codes: 08606
- Dialling codes: 037434
- Vehicle registration: V, AE, OVL, PL, RC
- Website: www.gemeinde-triebel.de

Triebel is a municipality in the Vogtlandkreis district, in Saxony, Germany, situated south of the town of Plauen.

== Fotographs ==
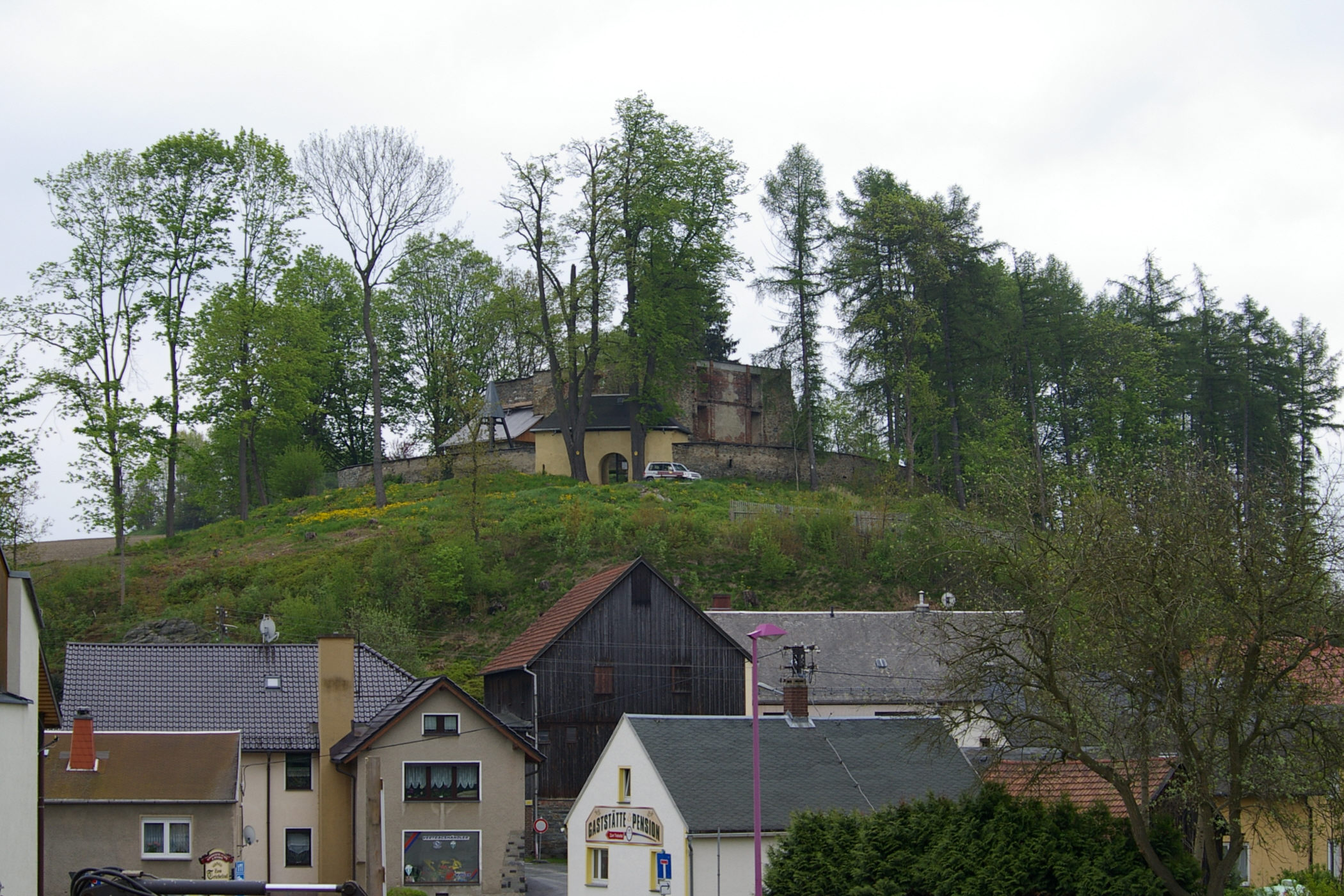
Kirchberg in Triebel

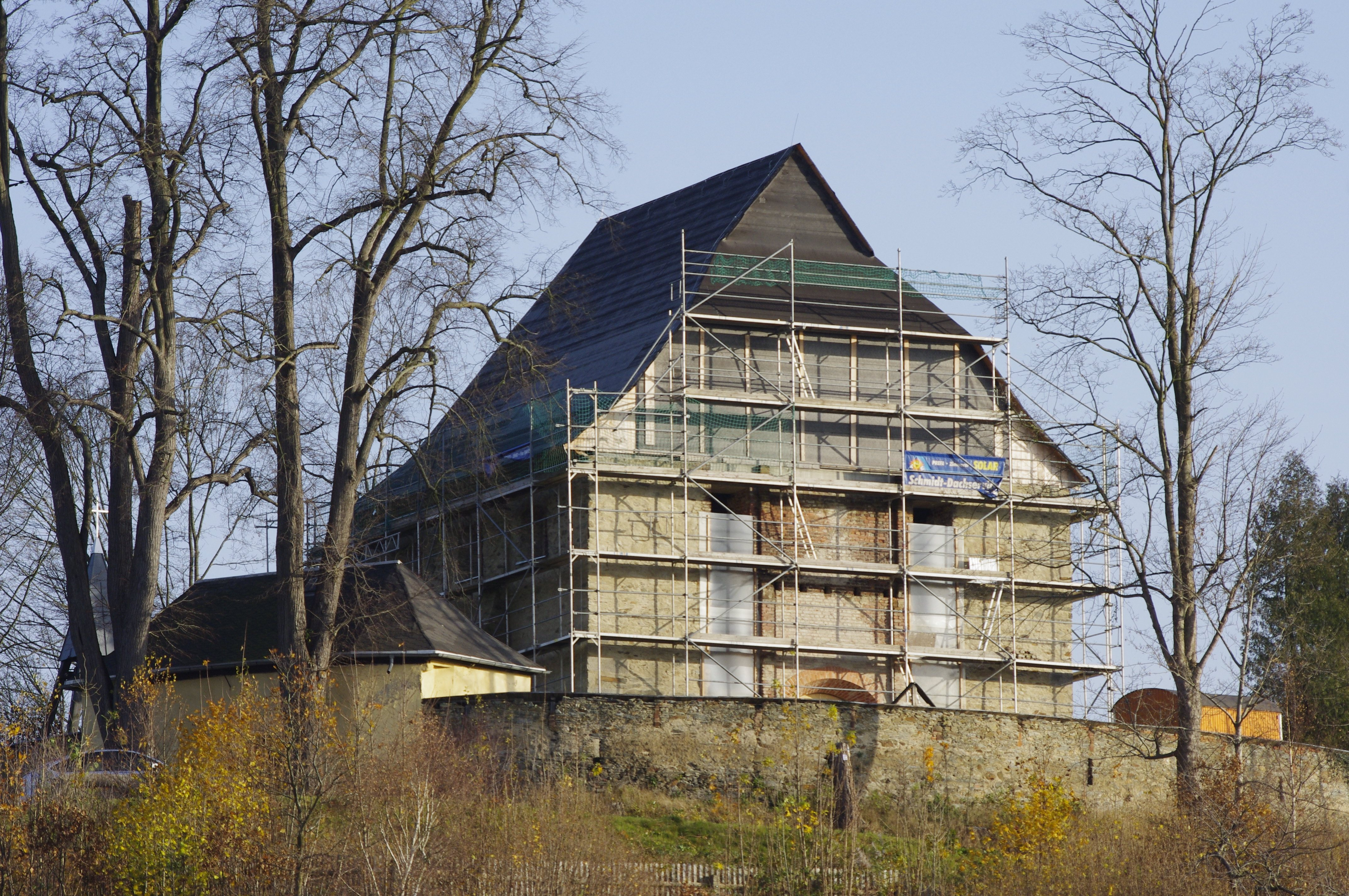
Saint Ägidien Church (2014)
