= Chemnitz-Gablenz =

Neighborhood in Chemnitz, Saxony, Germany

Coordinates: 50.8292°N 12.9625°E

Gablenz is a neighborhood in the southeastern part of the German city of Chemnitz in the state of Saxony.

== Geographical Location ==
Bordering neighborhoods are, clockwise starting from the north, Yorckgebiet, Adelsberg, Bernsdorf, Lutherviertel, and Sonnenberg.

== History ==
The former village of farmers, Gablenz, was originally mentioned in the census register of the Benedictine Monastery of Chemnitz in the year 1200 (as Gabilencia). It gets its name from the nearby creek with the same name, which flows through the area. The name is Slavic in origin and means "Apple Tree Creek.“ Gablenz became a part of the city of Chemnitz in the year 1888. Gablenz Creek flows at what is today Rochlitzer Street into Chemnitz River beneath ground.

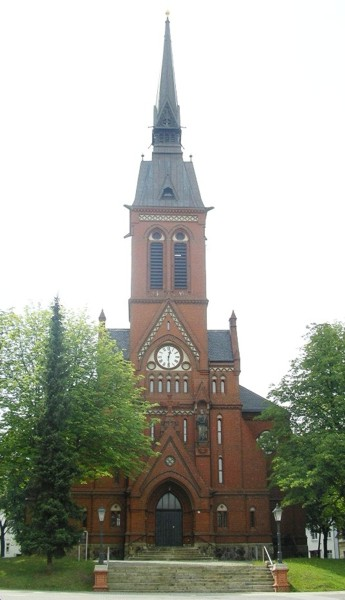
St. Andreas Church in Gablenz

Old Waldhufendorf once stretched from Johannisvorstadt in the west of the city over to Euba in the east. To the north, Gablenz bordered the Zeisigwald Forest (known today as Yorckgebiet), to the north-east to Sonnenberg. In the year 1402, the Chemnitz Monastery sold the western part of the monastery, which was part of Gablenz, to the City of Chemnitz, which pushed the outer limits of the city to what is today Zeiß and Jahn Streets. With the closure of the Benedictine Monastery in Chemnitz in the year 1547, Gablenz came into the fold of the administrative district of Chemnitz, (Amt Chemnitz). Like many of the villages in the area, Gablenz was devastated and plundered several times during the Thirty Years' War.

Being the outskirts of Chemnitz impeded a quicker development of the village. It was only first in the 19th century that the Gablanz Bach Factories set up shop. Through that development, Gablenz became a colony of workers, for example, on Geibel and Claus Streets. Glablenz grew ever more to the west toward and with Chemnitz, until it the village was annexed into the city on April 1, 1900. In the eastern part of the area, a settlement of large apartment flats (known as Plattenbau) were built between 1967 and 1970, which known as the Hans Beimler Area. Another Plattenbau settlement was built in the northeast of the neighborhood between 1970 and 1974 as the Yorckstraße residential area, which made up the Yorkgebiet Neighborhood, which existed as its own official neighborhood until 1992/93.

In the recent past, Gablenz experienced an influx in population, due to the comprehensive renovation of the residential buildings. As a part of that, the residential areas of Heimgarten, Sachsenring, Kreher and Zschopauer Streets, among others, have been brought back to life. The extraordinarily great number of garden areas, which are located between the apartment flat buildings, make Gablenz a beloved place to live in Chemnitz.

== Economy and Infrastructure ==
=== Transportation ===
Tram line 5 of the Trams in Chemnitz of the Chemnitz Transit Company (CVAG) runs through Chemnitz, with stops at Reineckerstraße, Nürnberger Straße, Gablenzplatz, Arthur-Strobel-Straße, Pappelhain and Gablenz. In addition to that, the neighborhood can be reached with bus lines 43, 62, and 72, as well as night service with N13. Access from the southern direction is available with line 33. The longest street is Carl von Ossietzky Street, which not only runs through many residential neighborhoods of the city (for example Lutherviertel, Hans Beimler Area), but also intersects with many major roads, as well as heritage areas, such as the Heimgarten Settlement and Geibelstraße/Gartenstadt (Garden City).

=== Education ===
Until February 2008, the Johannes Kepler Preparatory School was located in Gablenz, which is known beyond Chemnitz for its first-class education in mathematics and natural sciences. In the winter break of 2008, it moved to the renovated school of Humboldthöhe. Also notable are Friedrich Adolf Wilhelm Diesterweg Secondary School, Gablenz Secondary School and Gablenz Elementary School (formerly known as the Ernst Enge School). Further, the freely integrative Montessori Elementary School of the Montessori Association of Chemnitz is on Ernst Enge Street.

=== Gablenz Center ===
The former "Hans Beimler" shopping centre is on Ernst Enge Street. In the late 1990s, it was completely modernized, expanded, and renamed the Gablenz Center. It offers neighbors, in large and small quantities grocery, drugstore, books, and several choices for shopping. It further fulls its role in that it houses, among other things, gastronomy, drugstores, pharmacies, cosmetology, and two banks.

=== Gartenstadt Gablenzsiedlung ===
In the middle of the heart of Gablenz is the Gartenstadt Gablenzsiedlung (Garden City Gablenze Settlement). The unusual architectural treasure stands out with its stunning outdoor features and varied, harmonious façade designs. The settlement, which has almost remained completely preserved in its original, was built between 1910 and 1937 and renovated between 1999 and 2003 under preservation codes. In the year 2003, the Gartenstadt was awarded with the Deutscher Bauherrenpreis (German Builders' Prize). The entire historic center of Gablenz, which today is made up of a continuous grouping of about 60 buildings, is protected as a heritage area.

== Reading List ==
- Jörn Richter (Hrsg.): Gartenstadt Gablenzsiedlung Chemnitz: Entstehung, Geschichte und Sanierung einer Genossenschaftssiedlung. CAWG eG, Verlag Heimatland Sachsen, 2002. 128 Seiten. ISBN 3910186386
