= Großweitzschen =

- Municipality
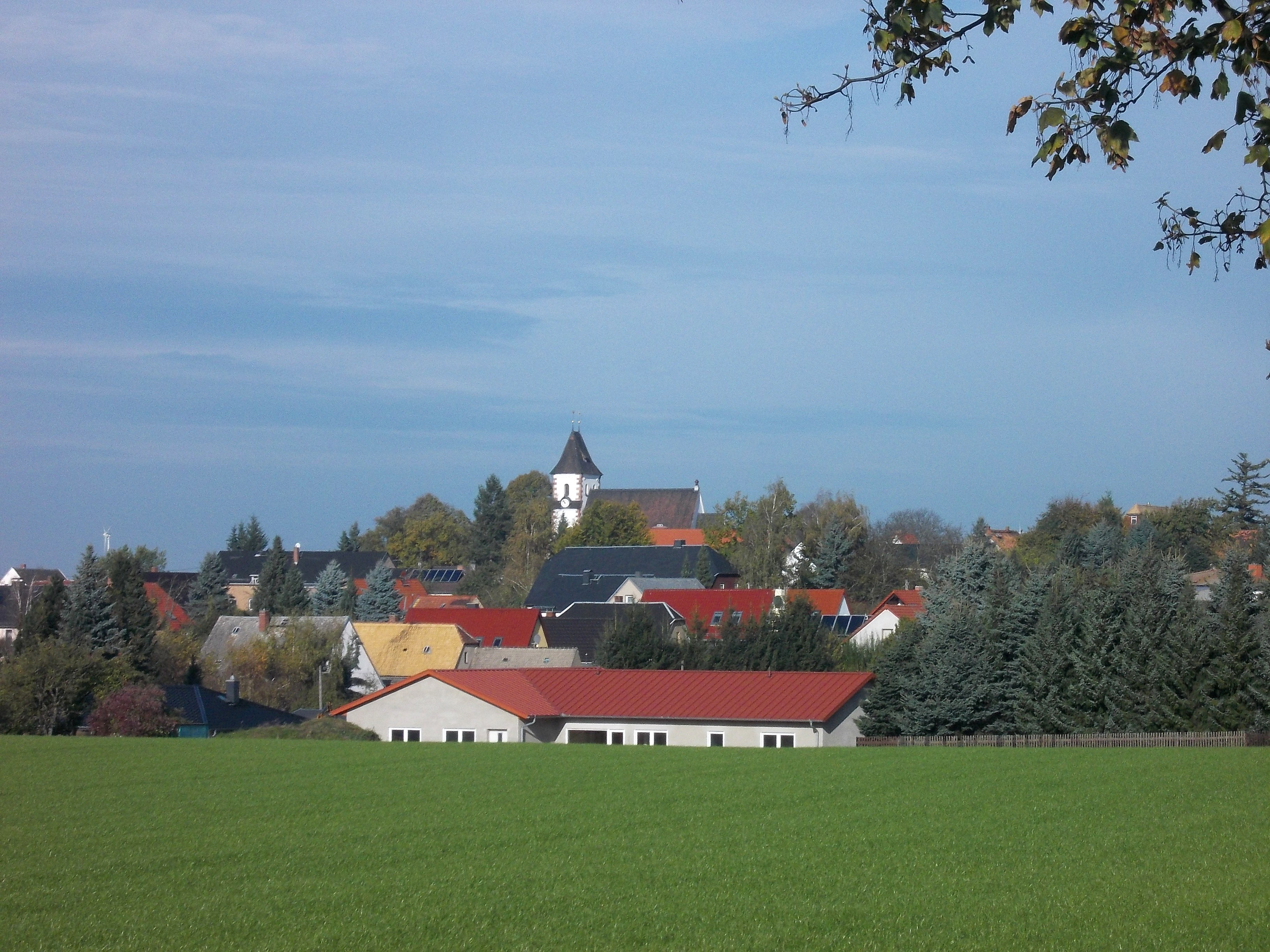
- Großweitzschen seen from the southeast

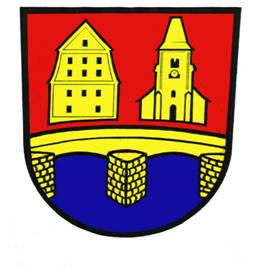
- Coat of arms

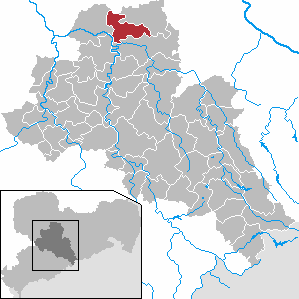
- Location of Großweitzschen within Mittelsachsen district
- Interactive map of Großweitzschen
- Location within Germany Location within Saxony
- Coordinates: 51°10′N 13°3′E
- Country: Germany
- State: Saxony
- District: Mittelsachsen
- Subdivisions: 24

Government
  - Mayor (2018–25): Jörg Burkert (Ind.)

Area
  - Total: 44.52 km^{2} (17.19 sq mi)
- Elevation: 239 m (784 ft)

Population (2025-12-31)
  - Total: 2,624
  - Density: 58.94/km^{2} (152.7/sq mi)
- Time zone: UTC+01:00 (CET)
  - Summer (DST): UTC+02:00 (CEST)
- Postal codes: 04720
- Dialling codes: 0 34 31
- Vehicle registration: FG
- Website: www.grossweitzschen.de

Großweitzschen is a municipality in the district of Mittelsachsen, in Saxony, Germany.
