= Eichigt =

- Municipality
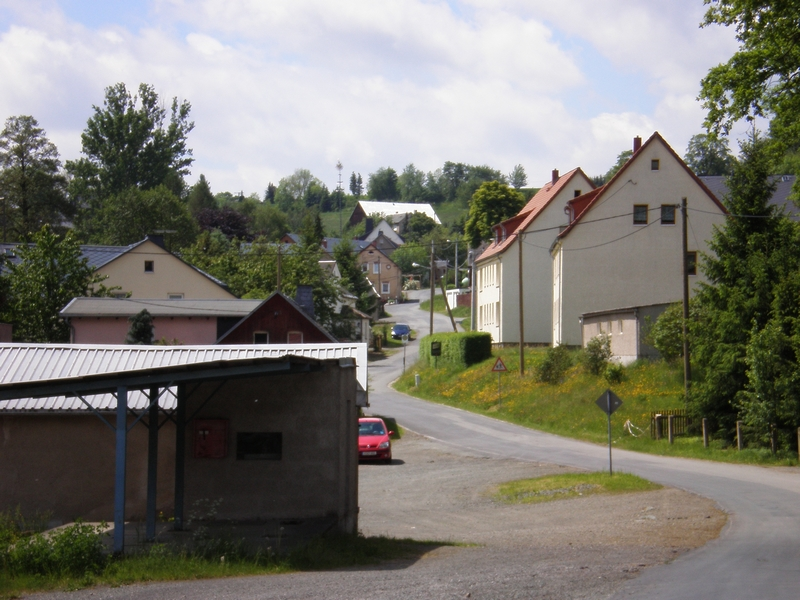

- Coat of arms

- Location of Eichigt within Vogtlandkreis district
- Interactive map of Eichigt
- Location within Germany Location within Saxony
- Coordinates: 50°21′N 12°10′E
- Country: Germany
- State: Saxony
- District: Vogtlandkreis
- Subdivisions: 10

Government
  - Mayor (2021–28): Stephan Meinel

Area
  - Total: 32.72 km^{2} (12.63 sq mi)
- Elevation: 523 m (1,716 ft)

Population (2025-12-31)
  - Total: 1,081
  - Density: 33.04/km^{2} (85.57/sq mi)
- Time zone: UTC+01:00 (CET)
  - Summer (DST): UTC+02:00 (CEST)
- Postal codes: 08626
- Dialling codes: 037430 und 037421
- Vehicle registration: V, AE, OVL, PL, RC
- Website: www.eichigt.de

Eichigt is a municipality in the Vogtlandkreis district, in Saxony, Germany. This was the tripoint between West Germany, East Germany, and Czechoslovakia.
