= Demitz-Thumitz =

Demitz-Thumitz/Zemicy-Tumicy
- Municipality
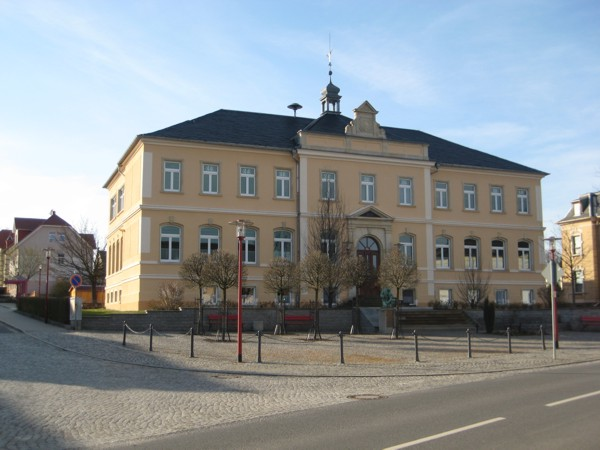
- Elementary school

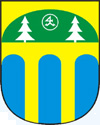
- Coat of arms

- Location of Demitz-Thumitz/Zemicy-Tumicy within Bautzen district
- Interactive map of Demitz-Thumitz/Zemicy-Tumicy
- Location within Germany Location within Saxony
- Coordinates: 51°8′N 14°15′E
- Country: Germany
- State: Saxony
- District: Bautzen
- Subdivisions: 9

Government
  - Mayor (2020–27): Jens Glowienka (CDU)

Area
  - Total: 21.07 km^{2} (8.14 sq mi)
- Elevation: 250 m (820 ft)

Population (2025-12-31)
  - Total: 2,611
  - Density: 123.9/km^{2} (321.0/sq mi)
- Time zone: UTC+01:00 (CET)
  - Summer (DST): UTC+02:00 (CEST)
- Postal codes: 01877
- Dialling codes: 03594
- Vehicle registration: BZ, BIW, HY, KM
- Website: www.demitz-thumitz.de

Demitz-Thumitz (German) or Zemicy-Tumicy (Upper Sorbian, pronounced [ˈzɛmʲitsɨ ˈtumʲitsɨ]) is a municipality in the east of Saxony, Germany. It belongs to the district of Bautzen.

== Geography ==
The municipality is situated at the edge of the Lausitzer Bergland (Lusatian Hills).

== Villages ==
The following villages belong to the municipality (names given in German/Upper Sorbian):

- Demitz-Thumitz/Zemicy-Tumicy
- Wölkau/Wjelkowy
- Medewitz/Mjedźojz
- Birkenrode/Brězyšćo
- Rothnaußlitz/Čerwjene Noslicy
- Cannewitz/Chanecy
- Karlsdorf/Karlecy
- Pottschapplitz/Počaplicy
- Pohla-Stacha/Palow-Stachow

== History ==
Within the German Empire (1871-1918), Demitz-Thumitz was part of the Kingdom of Saxony.

== Transport ==
Demitz-Thumitz is located at the railroad line Dresden-Görlitz and the Bundesstraße 6 (Dresden-Bautzen).
