= Grünbach, Saxony =

Grünbach
- Municipality
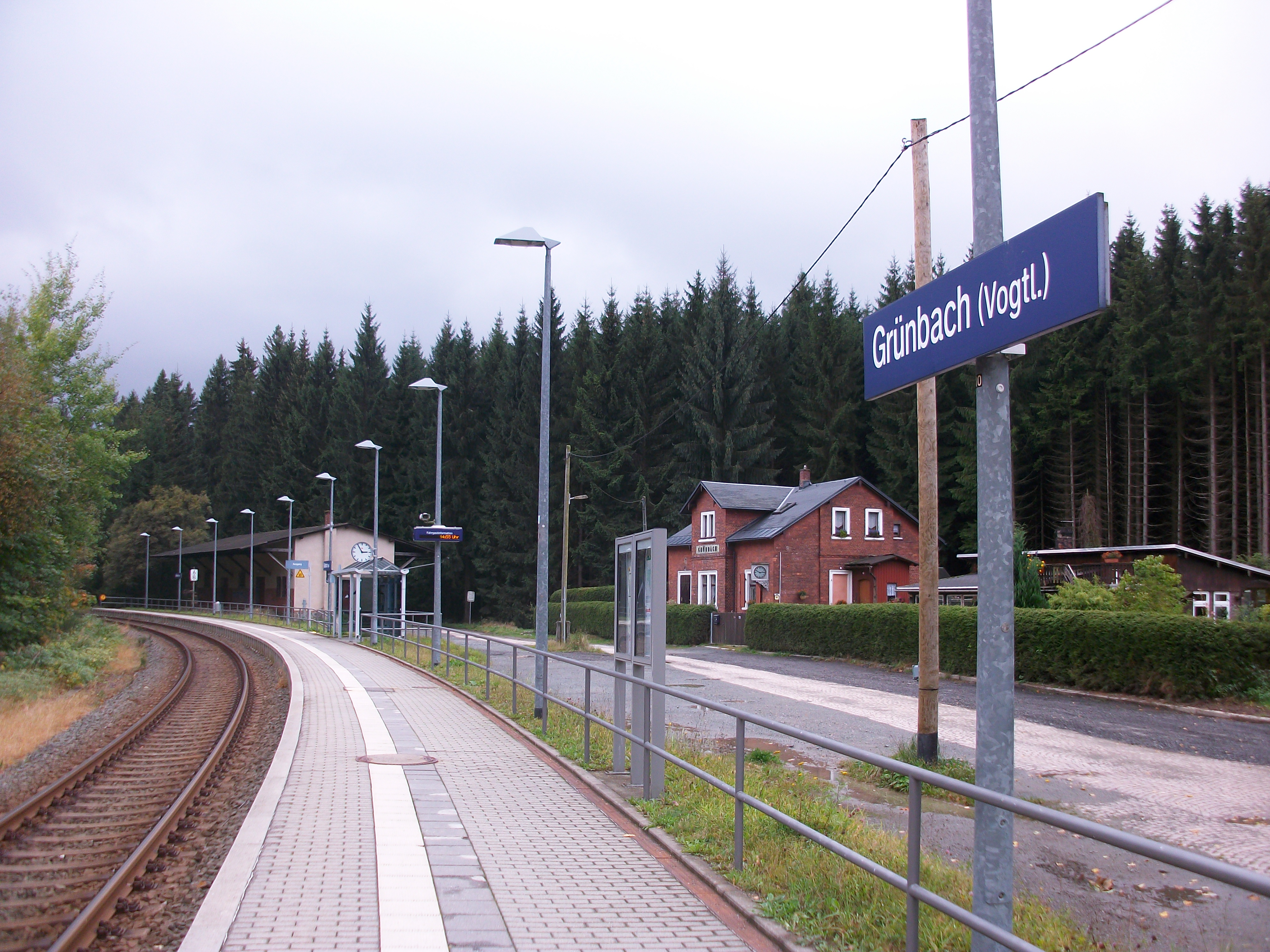
- Grünbach (Vogtl) railway platform

- Location of Grünbach within Vogtlandkreis district
- Interactive map of Grünbach
- Location within Germany Location within Saxony
- Coordinates: 50°26′57″N 12°21′45″E
- Country: Germany
- State: Saxony
- District: Vogtlandkreis

Government
  - Mayor (2023–30): Ralf Kretzschmann

Area
  - Total: 27.54 km^{2} (10.63 sq mi)
- Elevation: 697 m (2,287 ft)

Population (2025-12-31)
  - Total: 1,616
  - Density: 58.68/km^{2} (152.0/sq mi)
- Time zone: UTC+01:00 (CET)
  - Summer (DST): UTC+02:00 (CEST)
- Postal codes: 08223
- Dialling codes: 03745
- Vehicle registration: V, AE, OVL, PL, RC
- Website: www.gruenbach.de

Grünbach is a municipality in the Vogtlandkreis district, in Saxony, Germany.

== Population development ==
Historical population (31 December):

- 1971: 2,374
- 1998: 2,085
- 1999: 2,054
- 2000: 2,098
- 2001: 2,097
- 2002: 2,069
- 2003: 1,997
- 2004: 1,975
- 2007: 1,894
- 2008: 1,881
- 2012: 1,810
- 2013: 1,787
