= Bösenbrunn =

- Municipality
- Coat of arms

- Location of Bösenbrunn within Vogtlandkreis district
- Interactive map of Bösenbrunn
- Location within Germany Location within Saxony
- Coordinates: 50°23′50″N 12°6′0″E
- Country: Germany
- State: Saxony
- District: Vogtlandkreis

Government
  - Mayor (2022–29): Christian Klemet

Area
  - Total: 34.21 km^{2} (13.21 sq mi)
- Elevation: 465 m (1,526 ft)

Population (2025-12-31)
  - Total: 1,037
  - Density: 30.31/km^{2} (78.51/sq mi)
- Time zone: UTC+01:00 (CET)
  - Summer (DST): UTC+02:00 (CEST)
- Postal codes: 08606
- Dialling codes: 037434
- Vehicle registration: V, AE, OVL, PL, RC
- Website: www.boesenbrunn.de

Bösenbrunn is a municipality in the Vogtlandkreis district, in Saxony, Germany.
