= Heinsdorfergrund =

- Municipality
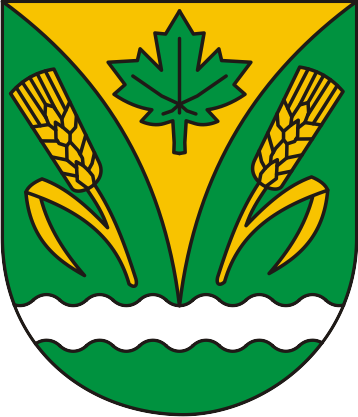
- Coat of arms

- Location of Heinsdorfergrund within Vogtlandkreis district
- Interactive map of Heinsdorfergrund
- Location within Germany Location within Saxony
- Coordinates: 50°37′20″N 12°22′20″E
- Country: Germany
- State: Saxony
- District: Vogtlandkreis
- Subdivisions: 3

Area
  - Total: 21.86 km^{2} (8.44 sq mi)
- Elevation: 380 m (1,250 ft)

Population (2025-12-31)
  - Total: 1,903
  - Density: 87.05/km^{2} (225.5/sq mi)
- Time zone: UTC+01:00 (CET)
  - Summer (DST): UTC+02:00 (CEST)
- Postal codes: 08468
- Dialling codes: 03765,037600
- Vehicle registration: V, AE, OVL, PL, RC
- Website: www.heinsdorfergrund-vogtland.de

Heinsdorfergrund (German pronunciation: [ˈhaɪnsdɔʁfɐˌɡʁʊnt]) is a municipality in the Vogtlandkreis district, in Saxony, Germany. The municipality was first mentioned in 1323 as Heinrichesdorf.
