= Belgershain =

- Municipality
- Coat of arms

- Location of Belgershain within Leipzig district
- Interactive map of Belgershain
- Location within Germany Location within Saxony
- Coordinates: 51°14′N 12°33′E
- Country: Germany
- State: Saxony
- District: Leipzig
- Subdivisions: 4

Government
  - Mayor (2022–29): Guido Mai

Area
  - Total: 22.77 km^{2} (8.79 sq mi)
- Elevation: 148 m (486 ft)

Population (2025-12-31)
  - Total: 3,455
  - Density: 151.7/km^{2} (393.0/sq mi)
- Time zone: UTC+01:00 (CET)
  - Summer (DST): UTC+02:00 (CEST)
- Postal codes: 04683
- Dialling codes: 034347 or 034293
- Vehicle registration: L, BNA, GHA, GRM, MTL, WUR
- Website: www.belgershain.de

Belgershain is a town in the Leipzig district in Saxony. It is part of the municipal association of Naunhof.

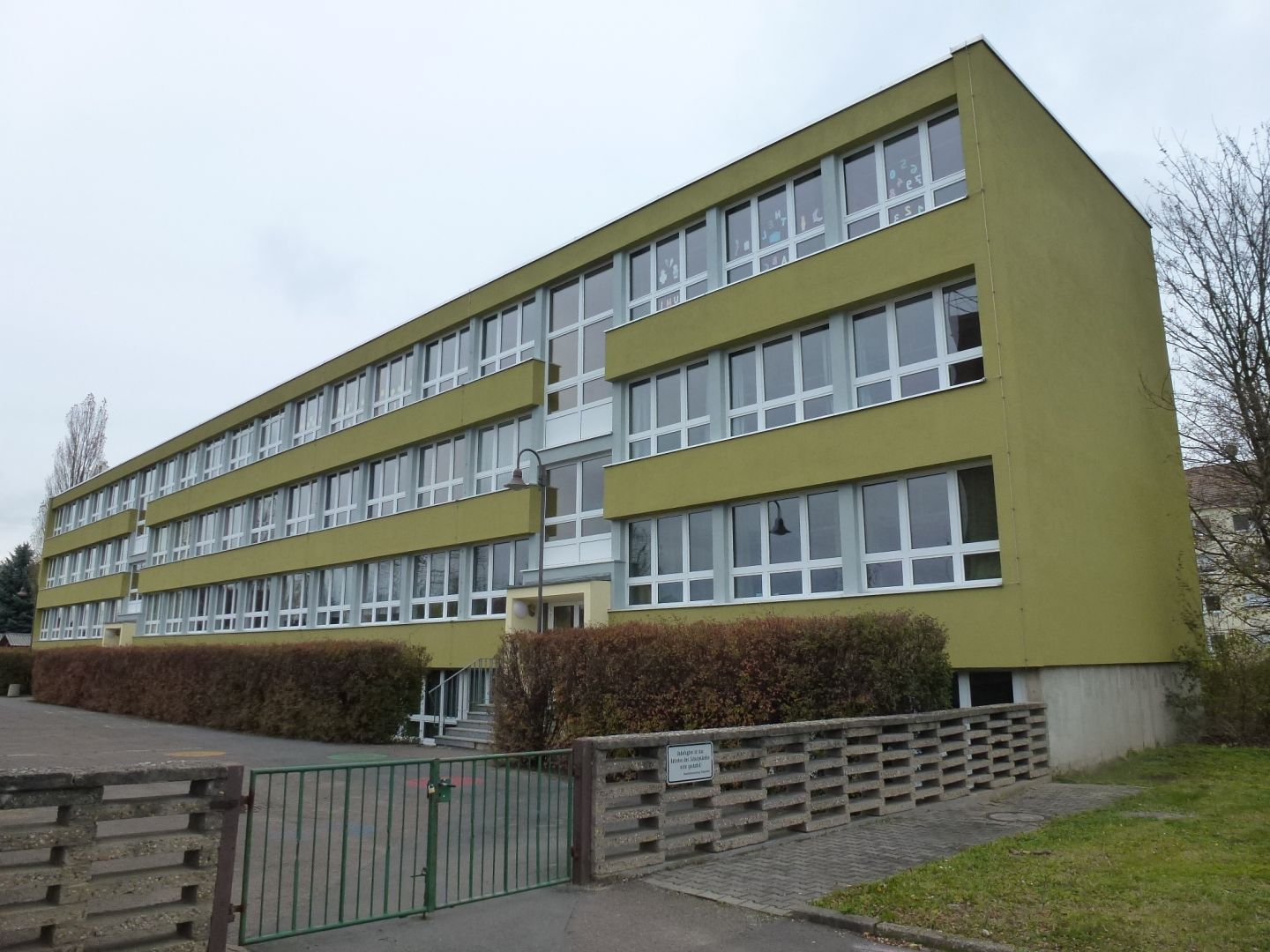
School

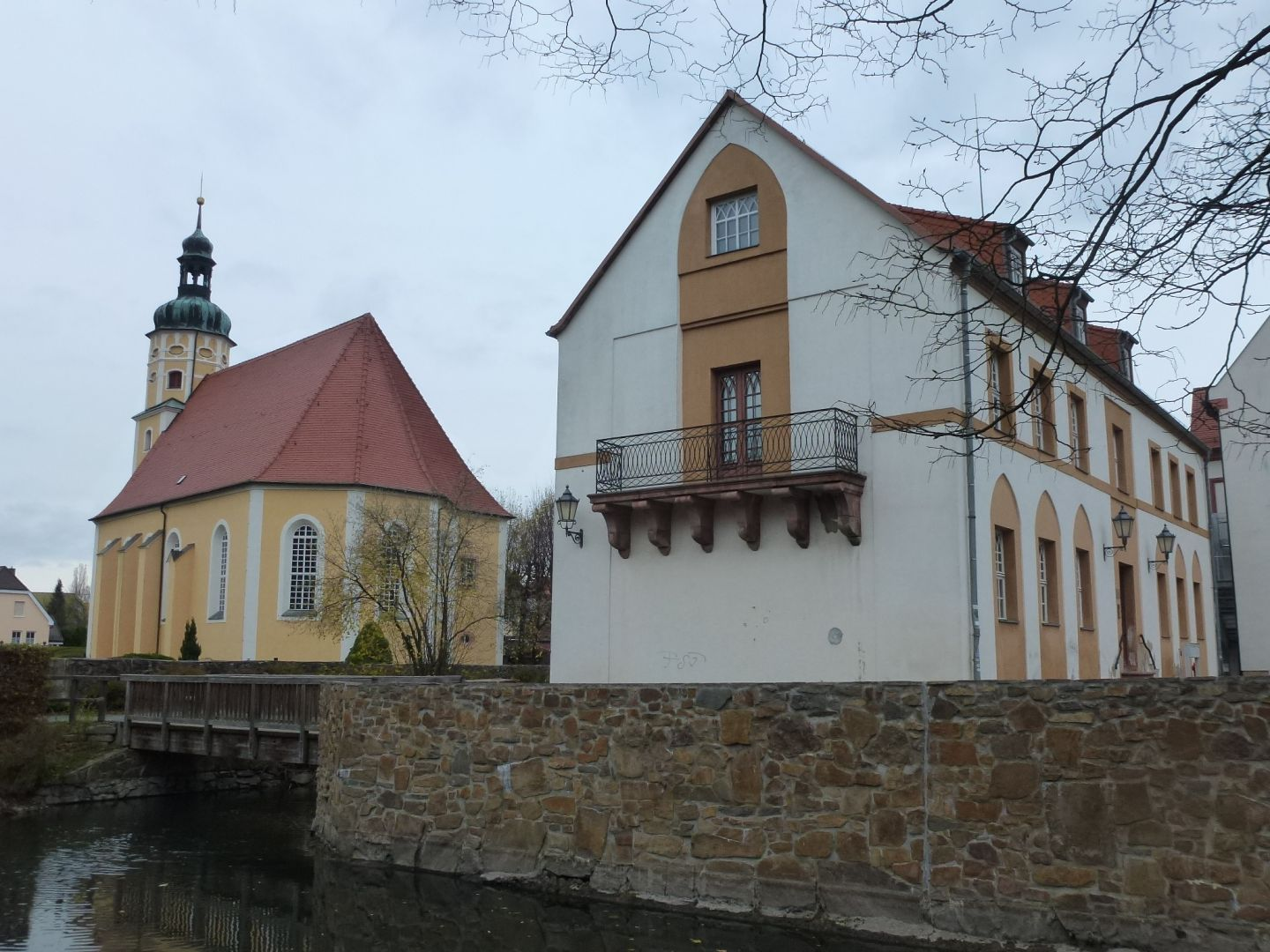
Town hall and church

== History ==
The first documented mention of Belgershain dates from 1296. Threna, since 1996 part of Belgershain, is documented as the seat of Wulferus von Trenowe in 1205 and celebrated its 800th birthday in June 2005

== Geography and transportation ==
The town is approximately 25 km east of Leipzig. The town lies on the Federal Road 38 Leipzig - Grimma as well as on the Leipzig–Geithain railway. A train passes through every two hours.

== Sights ==
- Neo-gothic castle with castle gardens
- Churches in Köhra and Threna from the 13th Century
- Baroque Johanneskirche in Belgershain
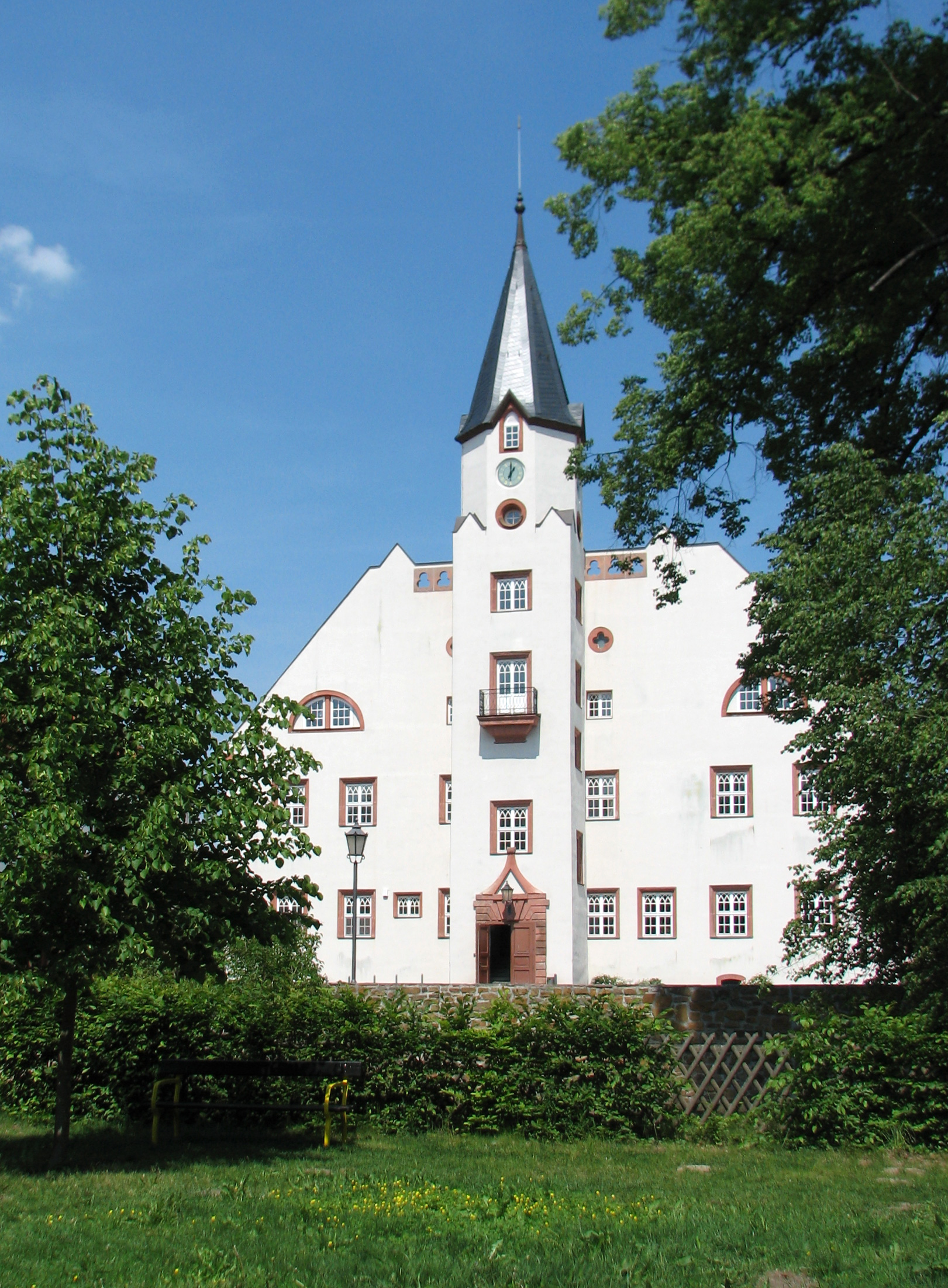
Castle

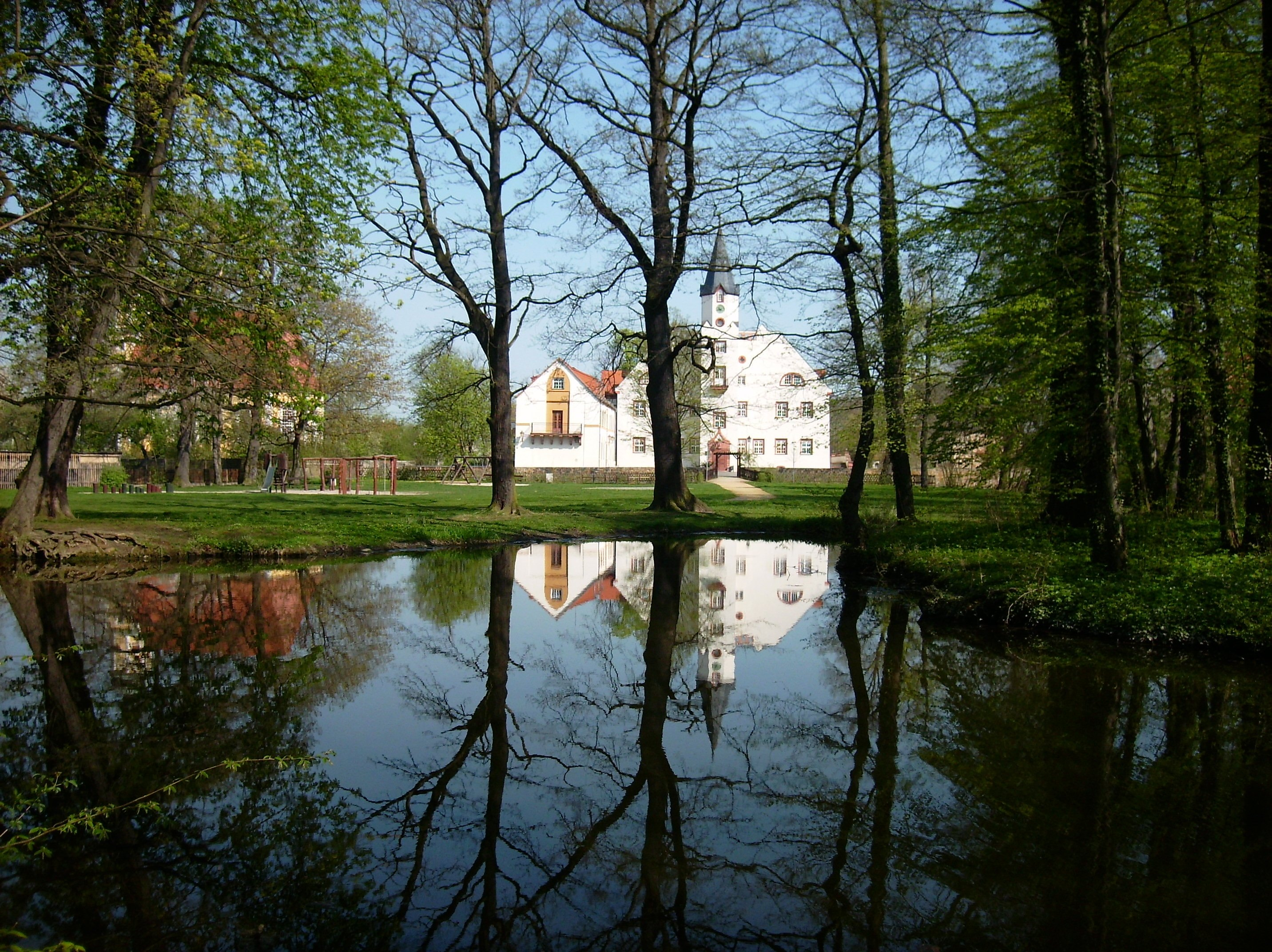
View from the park to the castle and cavalry house

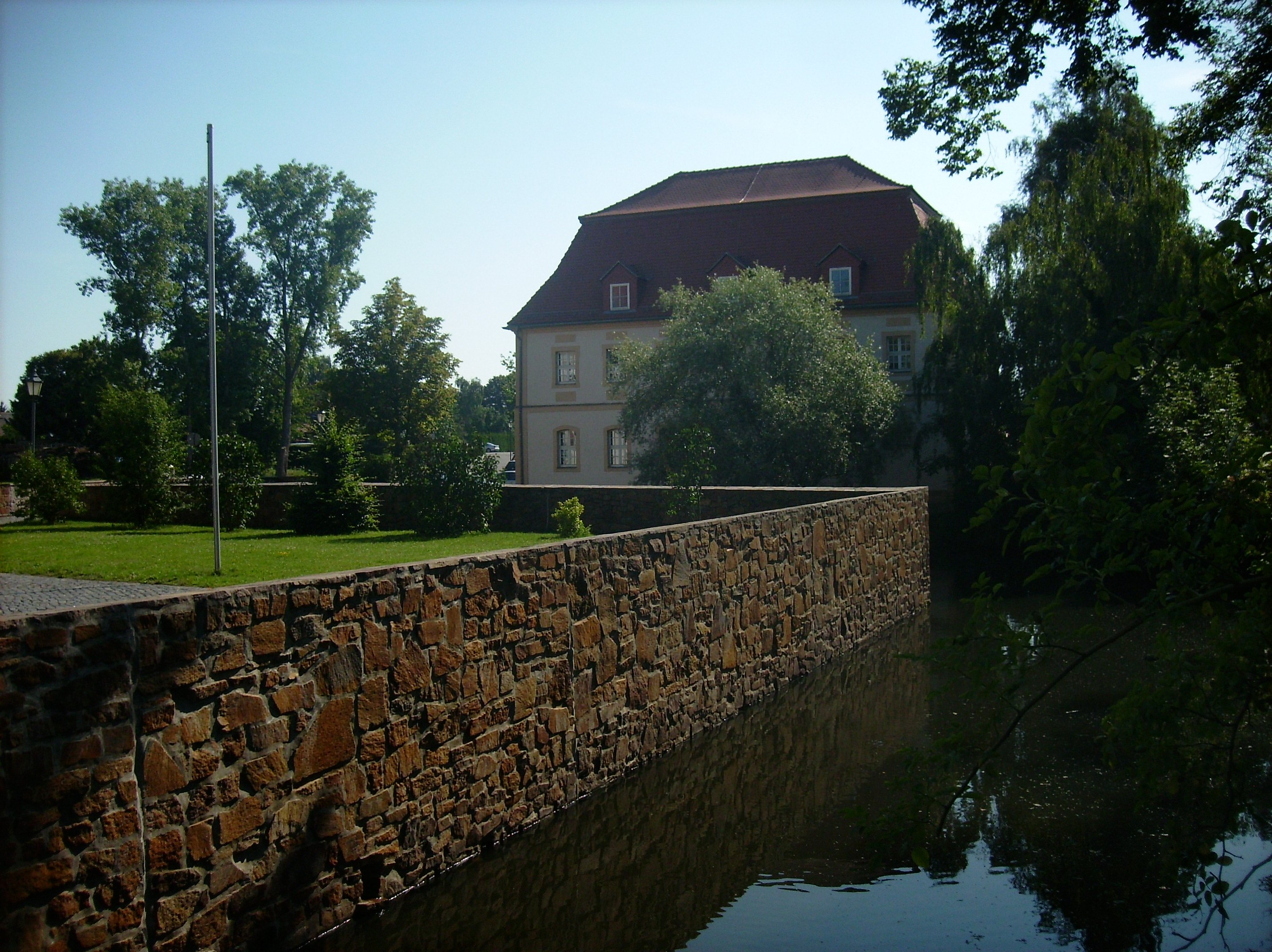
Administrative building

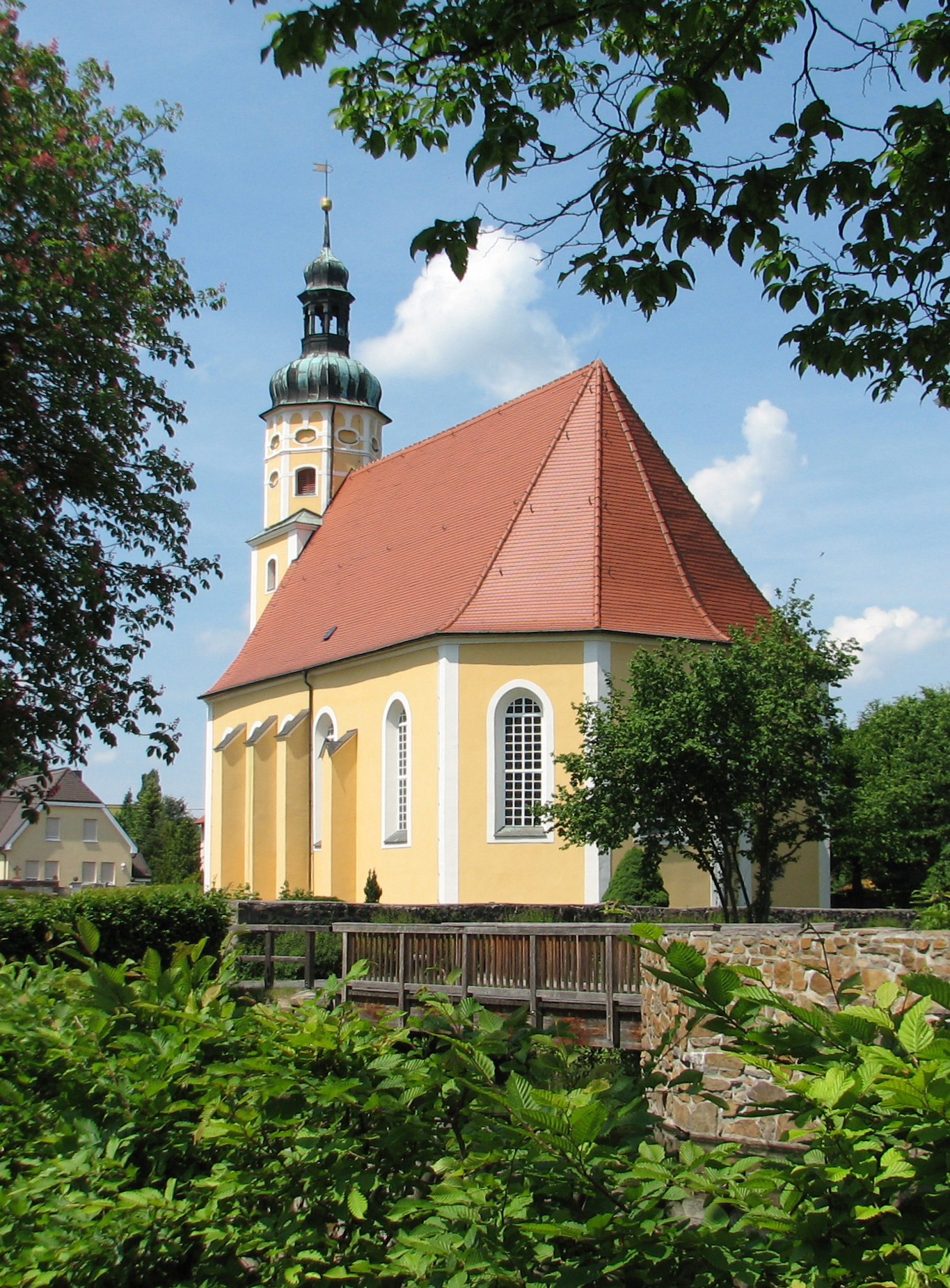
Johanneskirche in Belgershain

== Municipal subdivisions ==
Belgershain has the following subdivisions:

- Belgershain
- Threna
- Köhra
- Rohrbach

== Personalities ==
Film producer Heinz Angermeyer was born in Belgershain in 1900.
