= Oppach =

- Municipality
- Coat of arms

- Location of Oppach within Görlitz district
- Interactive map of Oppach
- Location within Germany Location within Saxony
- Coordinates: 51°3′30″N 14°30′8″E
- Country: Germany
- State: Saxony
- District: Görlitz
- Subdivisions: 5

Government
  - Mayor (2022–29): Sylvia Hölzel

Area
  - Total: 8.01 km^{2} (3.09 sq mi)
- Elevation: 321 m (1,053 ft)

Population (2025-12-31)
  - Total: 2,174
  - Density: 271/km^{2} (703/sq mi)
- Time zone: UTC+01:00 (CET)
  - Summer (DST): UTC+02:00 (CEST)
- Postal codes: 02736
- Dialling codes: 035872
- Vehicle registration: GR, LÖB, NOL, NY, WSW, ZI
- Website: www.oppach.de

Oppach (Upper Sorbian: Wopaka, pronounced [ˈwɔpaka]) is a municipality in the district Görlitz, in Saxony, Germany.

== Population development ==
Year	Population
1834	1914
1871	2633
1890	2766
1910	2952
1925	2977
1939	3250
1946	3987
1950	4276
1964	3938
1990	3256
2000	3203
2007	2986
2009	2914
