= Cavertitz =

- Municipality
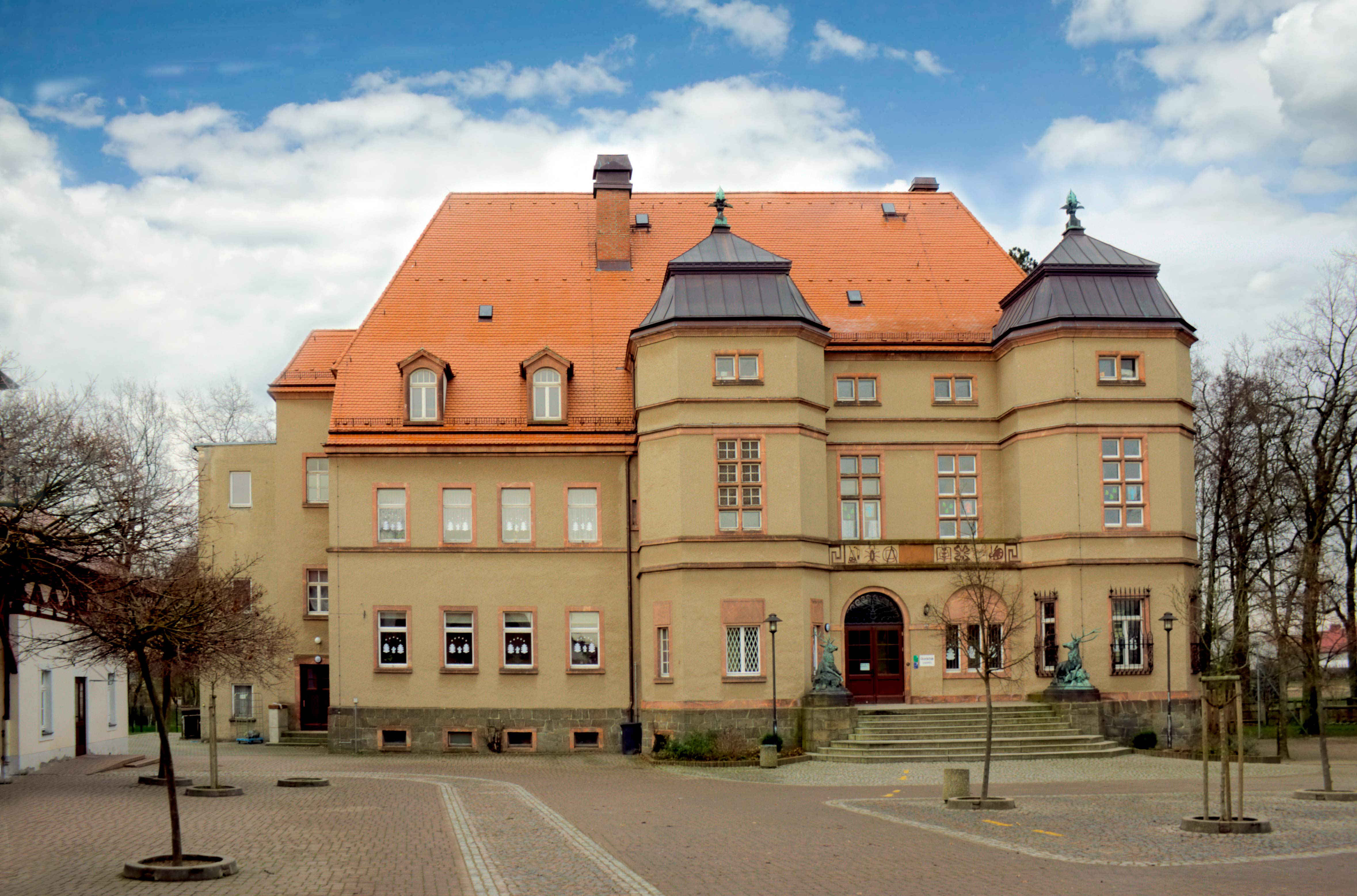
- Cavertitz Castle

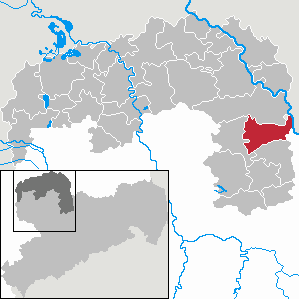
- Location of Cavertitz within Nordsachsen district
- Interactive map of Cavertitz
- Location within Germany Location within Saxony
- Coordinates: 51°18′1″N 13°6′26″E
- Country: Germany
- State: Saxony
- District: Nordsachsen
- Subdivisions: 12

Government
  - Mayor (2022–29): Christiane Gürth (Independent)

Area
  - Total: 68.91 km^{2} (26.61 sq mi)
- Elevation: 103 m (338 ft)

Population (2025-12-31)
  - Total: 2,061
  - Density: 29.91/km^{2} (77.46/sq mi)
- Time zone: UTC+01:00 (CET)
  - Summer (DST): UTC+02:00 (CEST)
- Postal codes: 04758
- Dialling codes: 034363
- Vehicle registration: TDO, DZ, EB, OZ, TG, TO
- Website: www.cavertitz.de

Cavertitz is a municipality in the district Nordsachsen, in Saxony, Germany.
