= Abosede =

Nigerian Given Name

Abọ́sẹ̀dé
- Gender: Feminine

Origin
- Language: Nigerian
- Meaning: Born in the start of a new week
- Region of origin: Southwest

Other names
- Alternative spelling: Bosede
- Short form: Bọ́sẹ̀dé or bọ́sẹ̀

Abọ́sẹ̀dé audio is a Nigerian Given Yoruba name meaning "Born in the start of a new week" or Sunday born girl. The name is typically given to a female child born on Sunday in the Southwest region of the country. Abọ́sẹ̀dé falls under one of the categories of names in Yoruba language known as Oruko-Abiso, meaning given names or ascribed/acquired names. Bọ́sẹ̀ is the diminutive form for Abọ́sẹ̀dé.

== Notable people bearing the name ==
- Abosede George, Nigerian-American academic
- Yetunde Abosede Zaid (born 1969), Nigerian librarian
