= Ingetraut Dahlberg =

German philosopher, information scientist and librarian

Ingetraut Dahlberg Dr.
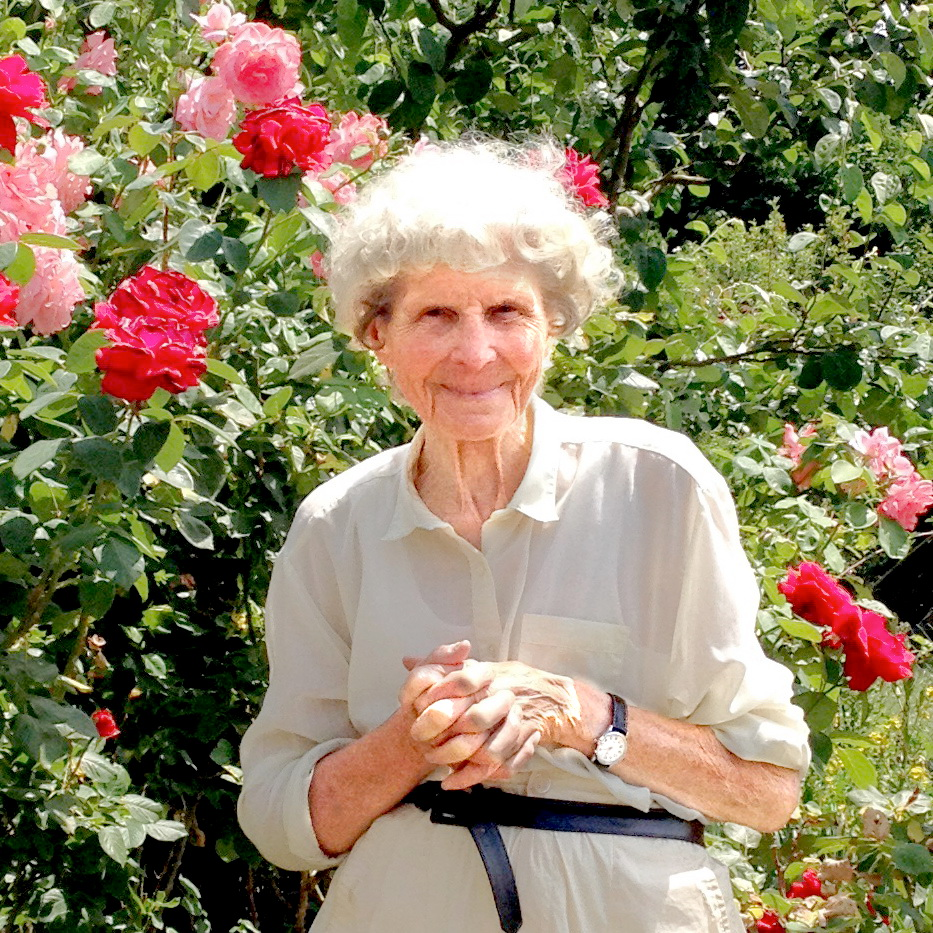
- Ingetraut Dahlberg in her garden
- Born: Ingetraut Gessel; 20 February 1927; Cologne, Germany
- Died: 24 October 2017 (aged 90); Bad König, Germany
- Occupations: philosopher information scientist terminologist
- Notable work: Information Coding Classification
- Awards: International Association of Documentalists and Information Officers, Ranganathan Award; Eugen Wüster Sonderpreis

Ingetraut Dahlberg (20 February 1927 – 24 October 2017) was a German information scientist and philosopher who developed the universal Information Coding Classification covering some 6,500 subject fields. Her career spanned various roles in research, teaching, editing, and publishing. Dahlberg founded the journal International Classification (now Knowledge Organization) as well as both the scientific Society for Classification (de) and International Society for Knowledge Organization.

== Professional career ==
=== Early years ===
The interest of Ingetraut Dahlberg in documentation started when at the age of 10 years when she received a camera from her father at Christmas. She started to document everything she regarded as important.

Ingetraut Dahlberg lived most of her time in Frankfurt/Main. She studied Philosophy, History, Anglistics, Catholic Theology, and Biology at the universities of Frankfurt, Würzburg and Düsseldorf with one college year in the United States in between. (Note: Mary Manse College in Toledo, Ohio)

She married the physicist Dr. Reinhard Dahlberg, with whom she had her son Wolfgang.

=== Professional start ===
In 1959 she started a position at the Gmelin Institute headed by Prof. Dr. Erich Pietsch. Her job was to create bibliographical publications within the Documentation Center for Nuclear power. In 1961 she changed to abstracting work on economical topics in the "Rationalisierungs-Kuratorium der Deutschen Wirtschaft" (Board of Rationalisation and Innovation for the German Economy).

In the years 1962–63 she took part in a one-year course to become a Scientific Documentalist. This course was organized by the "German Documentation Society" at the Gmelin Institute.

=== Deutsche Gesellschaft für Dokumentation (DGD) (German Documentation Society) ===
After the course she started a position with the "Deutsche Gesellschaft für Dokumentation" (DGD), Frankfurt (German Documentation Society). where she had to take care of the library and the documentation of documentation literature. In order to follow an invitation by Prof. Raymund Pepinsky, Florida Atlantic University, Boca Raton, to help in a documentation center for crystallographic data documentation, she could take leave for the year 1964–65 to work at his "Groth Institute for Crystalographic Data Documentation". Later on, she could move to the university library (headed by Edward M. Heiliger); and could work in the first US-library to have a computer for this bibliographic work. Together with Jean Perreault she worked on problems of categories and relations in classification.

After her return to Frankfurt, she was appointed director of the "DGD-Library and Documentation Center". She also was asked to establish a Committee for Thesaurus Research and Classification to be chaired by Prof. Martin Scheele with Ingetraut Dahlberg acting as secretary. During this time she established also a descriptor system for information sciences.

During this period the president of the DGD, Prof. Helmut Arntz sent her also to The Hague for cooperation with a FID-UDC-Revision Committee for UDC numbers 03/04 out of which she developed a classification system of document types and their special aspect-oriented concepts covering more than 1,000 concepts (1968).

In the years 1967–1974 she also collaborated in the work of the German Standardization Institute on terminology, concerning DIN 2330 "Concepts and Terms, General Principles" (Note: DIN 2330: Begriffe und Benennungen; Allgemeine Grundsätze ("Concepts and Terms, General Principles")) and DIN 2331 "Concept Systems and their Presentation" (Note: DIN 2331: Begriffssysteme und ihre Darstellung (“Concept systems and their representation”)) Here she met Prof. Eugen Wüster, who had some influence on her further work.

In 1970, she was also delegated to cooperate in a Committee for Classification and Indexing in the context of the UNISIST-Program (Note: UNISIST = UNESCO United Nations International Scientific Information System) of UNESCO, headed by Douglas John Foskett.

=== Taking a doctor's degree ===
In 1971, she left the DGD in order to take up a postgraduate study in Philosophy with Prof. Alwin Diemer in Düsseldorf on further subjects such as General Linguistics and History of science (1971–1973). Her doctoral advisor suggested the scope and title: A Universal Classification System of Knowledge: its ontological, science-theoretical and information-theoretical foundations (English translation). Dahlberg obtained her degree in 1973; the thesis was published in 1974 by Verlag Dokumentation K. Saur as: Foundations for a universal organization of knowledge (Grundlagen universaler Wissensordnung).

=== Freelance work ===
During the work for her doctoral thesis and M.D. she continued to work on other projects.

- 1971–1972 she was appointed to the consulting group Database-system for the Bundesrepublik Deutschland (Federal Republic of Germany) of the German Federal Ministry of the Interior. She edited two of its resulting three volumes.
- 1972–1973 Collection of terms denoting subject fields, a project financed by the DGD.
- 1972–74 Collaboration with the FID/CR Group "Subject-Field Reference Code" (Note: FID=Fédération Internationale de Documentation, CR=Classification Research) in order to establish a Broad System of Ordering as proposed by the UNISIST Program).
- 1975–1976 appointed by the Deutscher Hochschulverband (Note: Association of professors) to revise their classification system of university courses.
- 1976–1979 elaboration of the DFG-Project "Logstruktur". (Note: The project name Logstruktur stands for logical structure, this is to say in respect of content relationships not unfolding from the name of a field of knowledge, but where background knowledge is required to see the interrelations. Parallel to this project the project "Semstruktur" was established, under the direction of Gerhard Wahrig. This dealt with the semantic structure, hence with the structure unfolding from the name of a field of knowledge.) In the middle of the seventies the collection of subject fields had grown to embrace 12,500 terms. The project was meant to collect and explore their definitions. This led to track numerous synonyms and resulted in a manageable reduction of the number of subject fields.
- 1978–1979 "Pilot Study DB-Thesaurus". As an assignment of the Deutsche Nationalbibliothek (German National Library) she had to examine their subject headings regarding their thesaurus pertinence and propose a relative recommendation.
- 1979–1992 Collaboration in the committee on Conceptual and Terminological Analysis in the Social Sciences (COCTA), sponsored by UNESCO and founded by Prof. Fred W. Riggs. She organized conferences in Bielefeld and Hattersheim and collaborated in the organization of its conference in Budapest.

=== Founding the Journal "International Classification" ===
In 1974, she founded the Journal International Classification (IC). (Note: The journal was published by Verlag Dokumentation K.G. Saur until 1980, afterwards by INDEKS-Verlag and since 1997 by Ergon-Verlag) Her coeditors were Alwin Diemer, Eugen Wüster, Jean Perreault and A. Neelameghan.

Its first issue contained Dahlberg's article "Zur Theorie des Begriffs" (On concept theory), in which she published her new concept theory for the first time. She referred to this article quite often in later publications. Her concept was considerably influenced by Gottlob Frege. Since its very beginning the journal contained – next to scientific articles – also a section on news, book reviews, and a continuing bibliography of current classification literature. In 1992, the journal changed its name into Knowledge Organization (see chapter Founding of INDEKS Company). It has been published under this name up to today.

=== Appearance of the Information Coding Classification ===
In 1977, the universal classification system of subject fields was ready and named Information Coding Classification (ICC). It is based on nine Levels of being and structured by nine facets. Its first presentation took place in Bangalore, India, during a seminar at S. R. Ranganathan's Documentation Research and Training Centre (the DRTC). It was a full success. The seminar proceedings were published under the title "Ontical Structures and Universal Classification". Before and after this seminar week, Ms. Dahlberg lectured at several universities in India. (Note: New-Delhi, Trivandrum, Madras, Varanasi (Prof. Kaula) and Tokyo, Japan)

=== Founding of INDEKS Company ===
In 1979, Ingetraut Dahlberg and her son Wolfgang set up a firm under the name of INDEKS purporting to establish indexes and classification systems. In 1980, she continued the firm without her son called from then on INDEKS Verlag.

=== Founding "Gesellschaft für Klassifikation (GfKl) Data Science Society" ===
For a meeting on 12 February 1977, Dahlberg invited representatives from libraries and documentation centres, commodity cataloguers, physics, chemistry and mathematics to come to Frankfurt in order to found the "Gesellschaft für Klassifikation e.V. Data Science Society" (GfKl). Already on June 4, 1977, she organized the first annual conference in Münster/Westfalen. She was elected chairperson of the society and acted also as its secretary until 1989. She organized the annual conferences until 1986 and published the proceedings volumes.

=== The FID Committee for Classification Research ===
Dahlberg was also chair of this Committee 1981 – 1987. During this time she organized its conferences in Canada, Germany and India. Twice she took the opportunity as head of GfKl and FID/CR to combine their conferences in 1979 (Bad Königstein) and 1982 (Augsburg).

=== International Classification and Indexing Bibliography (ICIB) ===
With a financial contribution from the Federal Ministry of Education and Research (Germany) she managed in 1980–1982 the collection, printing and indexing of a bibliography of internationally available literature on Classification and Indexing. Three of the five planned volumes could be published in the years 1982–1985. They covered the publications of the years 1952–1982 and contained more than 11,000 titles, all of them classed according to ICC and also according to the special Classification System of Classification, established for bibliographical data in the journal International Classification. Vol.1 contains a list of all universal and special classification systems and thesauri. Also the upper three hierarchical levels of ICC were published there.

=== Founding “International Society for Knowledge Organization (ISKO) ===
Owing to an increasing preponderance of mathematic-oriented members, the Gesellschaft für Klassifikation split in 1989 on the initiative of its concept-oriented members, who founded the "International Society for Knowledge Organization e.V." (ISKO). Ingetraut Dahlberg was elected president, Robert Fugmannn vice-president (Note: Fugmann had been vice-president of the Gesellschaft für Klassifikation beforehand.) ISKO obtained also the care of the journal "International Classification", founded by Dahlberg. The new term "Knowledge Organization" instead of classification soon became common usage and also the journal was renamed (1992) accordingly. Next to managing ISKO's head-organization Dahlberg also assisted in the creation of ISKO's national chapters. (Note: Bulgaria, Slovakia, Hungary, Italy, Spain, Russia, Poland, France, India, China) She took an active part in the organization of international conferences every other year and also in the German conferences in the intermediate years. She helped editing and published respective proceedings volumes (e.g.).

=== Retracting from official positions ===
At the age of 70 and because of health problems, Ingetraut Dahlberg retired from her official positions in 1997. In 1998 she left Frankfurt for Bad König, a spa town in the eastern Odenwald mountain area, 75 km south of Frankfurt. She transferred her INDEKS publishing house to the Ergon Verlag in Würzburg. Charles Gilreath from Texas A&M University became the new editor-in-chief for Knowledge Organization and Hanne Albrechtsen from Denmark became the new ISKO president for the rest of Dahlberg's elected time. Her special library of classification, terminology and information science literature went to the Maastricht McLuhan Institute for Digital Culture and Knowledge Organization, directed by Prof. Dr. Kim H. Veltman. Nevertheless, she remained engaged with her main occupational concern via contacts, publications, and lectures.

== Influence ==
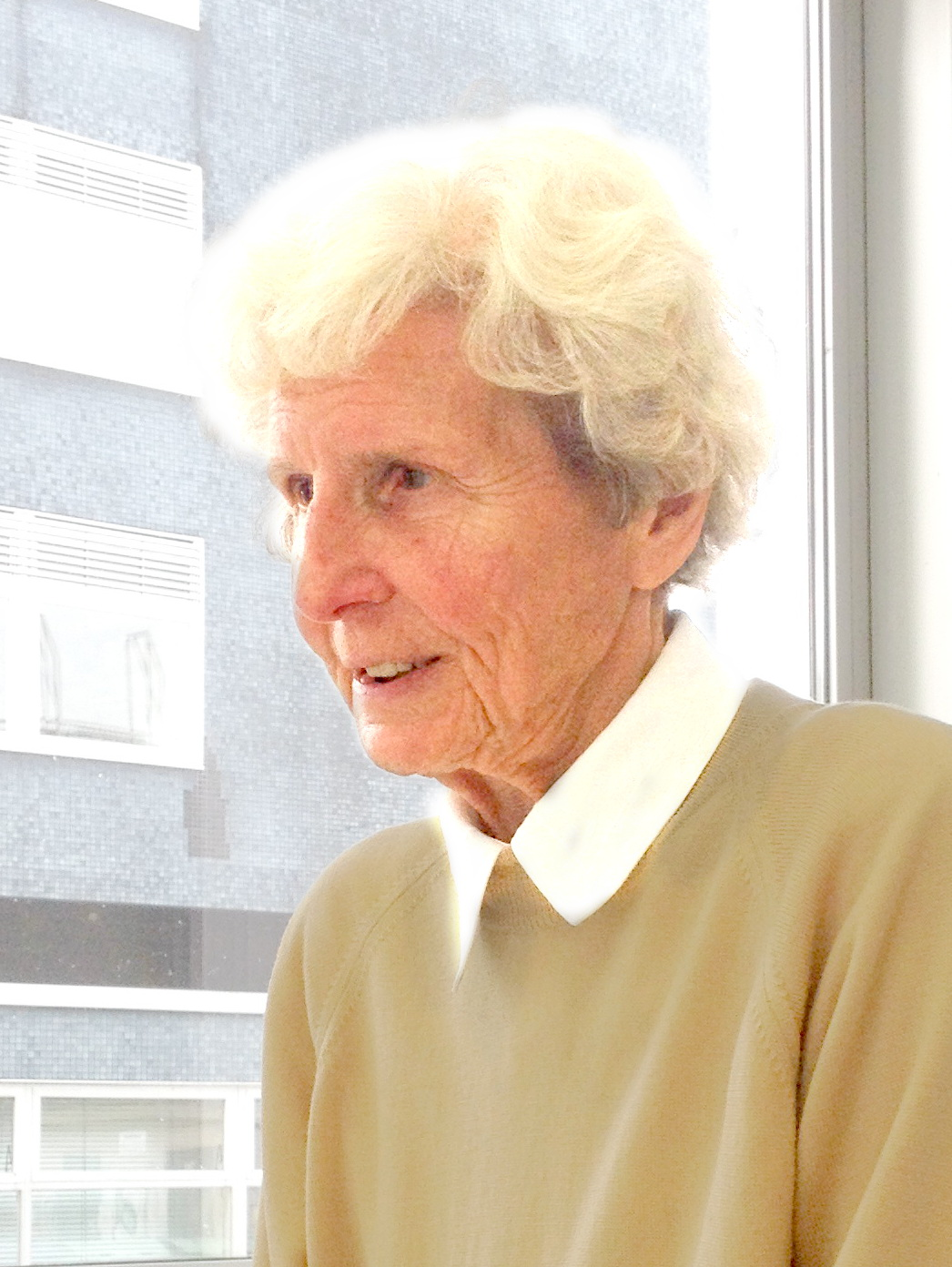
Ingetraut Dahlberg at a talk 25 October 2015 at Ernst Schröder Center for Conceptual Knowledge Processing in Darmstadt, Germany

=== More recent Work ===
After an encounter with Walter Koch during a conference in Karlsruhe in 2010. Ms. Dahlberg started to digitize some 3,500 of the 6,500 concepts of knowledge fields with their definitions in a table sheet file and also many concepts of the so-called "general concepts" from the zero-level of ICC (still unfinished). The data linkage has been published, co-authored by Ernesto William De Luca. Her recent book, published 2014, on "Knowledge Organization, Development, Task, Application, Future" also details some of the activities mentioned. It addresses particularly computer scientists, in order to convey to them a humanistic view on the content related treatment of their data, but turns also to readers wishing to access the topic principally. It also covers the theoretical basis of ICC and shows its many-fold potential for applications. She emphasizes her conception – next to subject-related aspects – of an innovating approach to science-policy issues. She strongly recommends Knowledge Organization to be anchored in universities as a discipline of its own under "Science of Science". Already in 1974 she had provided in her ICC a position for Knowledge Organization under the subject group "81" (Science of Science). She considers indeed this field to be explored within an institute or an academy since there is such a huge amount of work to be accomplished under the fruitful auspices of the whole array of insights gained so far.

=== Activities ===
Ingetraut Dahlberg was active in the area of classification, thesauri, terminology and knowledge organization. On these topics she has written far more than 300 publications. Apart from her own scientific work, she considerably contributed to furthering these topics also by the founding the journal "International Classification" in 1974 under its later name Knowledge Organization. She also directed a number of groups and institutions concerned with these scientific branches by organizing conferences and editing and publishing the proceedings volumes of these conferences. She also collaborated in the elaboration of standards (DIN 2330 and 2331) as well as DIN 32705, later on also for ISO/TC37 ("Terminology and other language and content resources") as well as ISO/TC 46 "Information and Documentation"). For 23 years she was editor-in-chief of her journal and founded the "Gesellschaft für Klassifikation e.V." (1977) and the "International Society for Knowledge Organization e.V." (1989). She also organized altogether 20 conferences for these two organizations and for FID/CR and COCTA.

=== Teaching Appointments ===
Starting 1976 she received teaching appointments at the University of Mainz (1976–1978) (Gerhard Wahrig). The project "Logstruktur" was connected with this appointment. It meant to explore the structure of definitions of the collected terms of ca. 6,500 knowledge fields and to systematize them. With this, the preliminary work was ready for an encyclopedia of knowledge fields. Further teaching appointments were at the University of Saarbrücken (1984–1985), Hochschule Hannover (1985–87) and Darmstadt University of Applied Sciences (1988–1989). In addition, Dahlberg was often requested to lecture at many universities and gave seminars in India and Brazil.

=== Publications ===
Ms. Dahlberg wrote far more than 300 publications among which also encyclopedic entries on classification and knowledge organization.

=== Mission ===
Ingetraut Dahlberg deplores the dispersion of knowledge in our times and finds the reason for this development in the diversity of thesauri and also of subject-oriented ontologies. As a practical-sensed philosopher, she would promote a sort of order reaching beyond a single subject-orientation (she uses the concept "universal order of knowledge" as a foundation for an interdisciplinary approach.

Above all, the book's purpose is to direct attention to the enormous significance of a universal order of knowledge embracing all necessary aspect of interdisciplinarity in present-day research which precisely is totally neglected by the multitude of existent ontologies and their reductive effect. A really global survey of our knowledge is feasible under ICC, which fits with its first two hierarchical levels in matrix form onto a screen and thus offers the insight into and the rediscovery of the lost unity of our knowledge.

— Ingetraut Dahlberg, from the introduction of her book "Wissensorganisation"

She presents this vista of view energetically and defends it against other aspects of knowledge organization

The motivation for writing this small book was first of all my recognizing – at the last international conference of ISKO in Krakow 2014 – that many young participants apparently were not clear about how knowledge organization was meant to be understood. On the other hand it happened that I had just written a book review on the "Handbook on Metadata, Semantics and Ontologies" of M.-A. Sicilia and realized, that computer-science colleagues seem to lack the knowledge which after all had already been developed for hundreds of years in the field of classification. Although they understand very well, that their data relate to contents and they therefore resort to classification systems and thesauri developed by information scientists, yet they lack their foundations.

— Ingetraut Dahlberg, from the introduction to the book "Knowledge Organization"

Overall, she is interested in seeing her Information Coding Classification system (ICC) being further developed and completed.

== Awards ==
- She received the 2nd prize of the "International Association of Documentalists and Information Officers" (A.I.D.) at the A.I.D. International Symposium 1965. The prize was divided between her and Mr. S. D. Boon, Eindhoven.
- Ranganathan Award. given at the FID Conference 1996 in Innsbruck
- Eugen Wüster Sonderpreis of the "International Information Center for Terminology" (Infoterm) 2006 in Vienna. (Co-financed by the City of Vienna and the Austrian UNESCO Commission).
