= Hope Olson =

Hope Olson may refer to:

- Hope A. Olson, a library scholar known for her critical analyses of classification systems
- Hope Olson (born April 4, 1956), an American model
