= Information Coding Classification =

The Information Coding Classification (ICC) is a classification system covering almost all extant 6500 knowledge fields (knowledge domains). Its conceptualization goes beyond the scope of the well known library classification systems, such as Dewey Decimal Classification (DDC), Universal Decimal Classification (UDC), and Library of Congress Classification (LCC), by extending also to knowledge systems that so far have not afforded to classify literature. ICC actually presents a flexible universal ordering system for both literature and other kinds of information, set out as knowledge fields. From a methodological point of view, ICC differs from the above-mentioned systems along the following three lines:

1. Its main classes are not based on disciplines but on nine live stages of development, so-called ontical levels.
2. It breaks them roughly down into hierarchical steps by further nine categories which makes decimal number coding possible.
3. The contents of a knowledge field is earmarked via a digital position scheme, which makes the first hierarchical step refer to the nine ontical levels (object areas as subject categories), and the second hierarchical step refer to nine functionally ordered form categories.

Respective knowledge fields permit to step down by the same principle to a third and forth level, and even further to a fifth and sixth level. Finally, knowledge field subdivisions will have to conform to said digital position scheme. Hence, for a given knowledge field identical codes will mark identical categories under respective numbers of the coding system. This mnemotechnical aspect of the system helps memorizing and straightaway retrieving the whereabouts of respective interdisciplinary and transdisciplinary fields.

The first two hierarchical levels may be regarded as a top- or upper ontology for ontologies and other applications.

The terms of the first three hierarchical levels were set out in German and English in Wissensorganisation. Entwicklung, Aufgabe, Anwendung, Zukunft, on pp. 82 to 100. It was published in 2014 and available so far only in German. In the meantime, also the French terms of the knowledge fields have been collected. Competence for maintenance and further development rests with the German Chapter of the International Society for Knowledge Organization (ISKO) e.V.

== Historical development ==
At the end of 1970, Prof. Alwin Diemer, Univ.of Düsseldorf proposed to Ingetraut Dahlberg to undertake a philosophical dissertation on The universal classification system of knowledge, its ontological, epistemological, and information theoretical foundations. Diemer had in mind an innovating ontological approach for such a system based on the whole spectrum of kinds of being and complying with epistemological requirements. The third requirement had already been taken up somehow in the Indian Colon Classification, yet it still called for explanations and additions. In 1974, the dissertation was published in German entitled Grundlagen universaler Wissensordnung. It started with conceptual clarifications, and why and how the term „universal“ was linked to knowledge, including knowledge fields, such as commodity science, artefacts, statistics, patents, standardization, communication, utility services et al. In chapter 3, six universal classification systems (DDC, UDC, LCC, BC, CC and BBK) were presented, analyzed and compared.

While preparing the dissertation, Dahlberg started with elaborating the new universal system by first gleaning a lot of extant designations of knowledge fields from whatever available reference works. This was funded by the German Documentation Society (DGD) (1971-2) under the title of Order system of knowledge fields. In addition, the syllabuses of German universities and polytechniques were explored for relevant terms and documented (1975). Thereafter, it seemed necessary to add definitions from special dictionaries and encyclopediae; it soon appeared that the 12.500 terms included numerous synonyms, so that the whole collection boiled down to about 6.500 concept designations (Project Logstruktur, supported by the German Science Foundation (DFG) 1976-78).

The outcome of this work was the formulation of 30 theses which ended up in 12 principles for the new system, published 40 years later under. These principles refer not only to theoretical foundations but also to structure and other organizational aspects of the whole array of knowledge fields. In 1974, the digital position scheme for field subdivision had already been developed to allow for classifying classification literature in the bibliographical section of the first issue of the Journal International Classification. In 1977, the entire ICC was ready for presentation at a seminar in Bangalore, India. A publication of the first three hierarchical levels appeared however only in 1982. It was applied to the bibliography of classification systems and thesauri in vol.1 of the International Classification and Indexing Bibliography; it has been updated.

== Governing principles ==
These were published in full length in the book Wissensorganisation. Entwicklung, Aufgabe, Anwendung, Zukunft and the article Information Coding Classification. Geschichtliches, Prinzipien, Inhaltliches, hence it suffices to just mention their topics with some necessary additions.

- Principle 1: Concept theoretical approaches. Concepts are the contents of ICC, they are understood as being units of knowledge. The „birth“ of a concept. Where do the characteristics, the knowledge elements come from? How do conceptual relations arise?
- Principle 2: The four kinds of concept relations and their applications.
- Principle 3: Decimal numbers form the ICC codes as its universal language.
- Principle 4: The nine ontical levels of ICC. They were grouped under three captions: Prolegomena (1-3), life sciences (4-6) and human output (7-9):

1. Structure and form
2. Matter and energy
3. Cosmos and earth
4. Biosphere
5. Anthroposphere
6. Sociosphere
7. Material products (economics and technology)
8. Intellectual products (knowledge and information)
9. Spiritual products (products of mind and culture)

- Principle 5: Knowledge fields are structured by categories, based on the Aristotelian form-categories, under a digital position scheme, a kind of scaling rule for subdividing a given field as follows:

1. General area: problems, theories, principles (axiom and structure)
2. Object area: objects, kinds, parts, properties of objects
3. Activity area: methods, processes, activities
4. Field properties or first characterization
5. Persons or secondary characterization
6. Societies or tertiary characterization
7. Influences from outside
8. Applications of the field to other fields
9. Field information and synthesizing tasks
The digital position scheme, called Systematifier, has also been used for structuring the entire system via the categories figuring on the upper zero level.

An example of its application is the structure of the classification system for knowledge organization literature Gliederung der Klassifikationsliteratur. (A simplified version with an additional introduction is given in, p. 71)

- Principle 6: The ontical levels outlined under principle 4 conform to the „integrative level theory“ which means that every level is integrated in the following one. In addition, each knowledge area presumes the following one.
- Principle 7: The combination potential of knowledge fields (interdisciplinarity and transdisciplinarity)is determined by the digital position scheme. (Examples are given in, p. 103-4)
- Principle 8: The categories of the zero-level are general concepts, their possible subdivisions could once be used for classificatory statements. (These subdivisions still need elaboration)
- Principle 9 and 10: These relate to the combination potential of classificatory statements with space and time concepts. (Still to be elaborated)
- Principle 11: The system's mnemotechnical aspect relies on the fixed system position codes and on the 3x3 form- and subject-categories.
- Principle 12: The combination potential of system position 1, 8 and 9 make ICC to a self-networking system which complies with the present scientific development.

== In matrix form ==
The first two levels of ICC can be represented by following matrix.

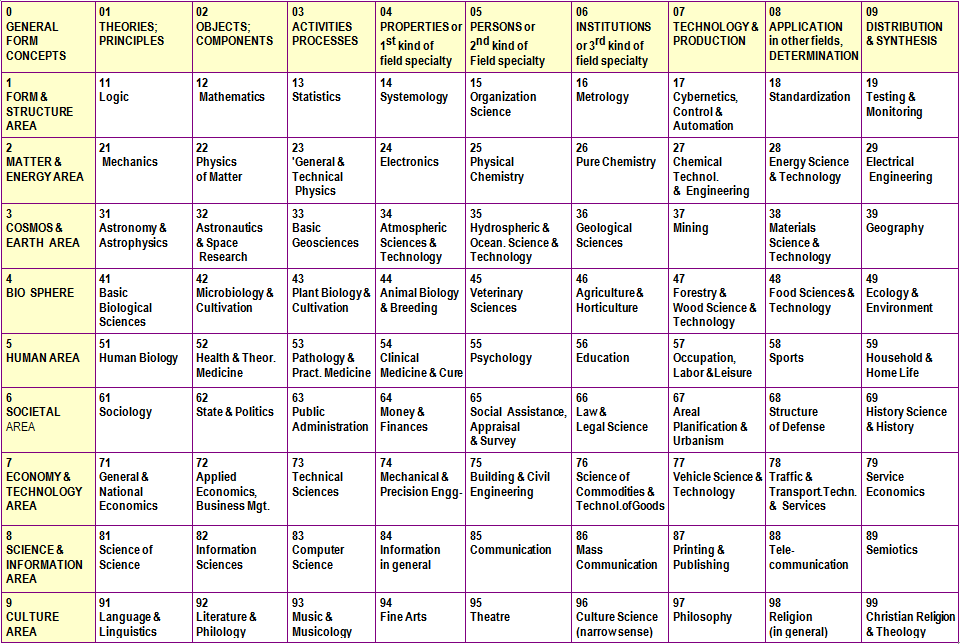

The first hierarchical level of the 9 subject categories results from the first vertical array under codes 1-9. The second hierarchical level of subject categories is structured by the 9 functionally ordered form categories, listed in the first horizontal line under codes 01-09. Some exceptions are mentioned in principle 7.

== Research ==
=== Exploration of automatic classification ===
For classifying web documents as conceived by Jens Hartmann, University of Karlsruhe, Prof.Walter Koch, University of Graz, has explored in his Institute for Applied Information Technology Research Society (AIT) the application of ICC to automatically classifying metadata of some 350.000 documents. This was facilitated by data generated within the framework of an EU-supported project "EuropeanaLocal". For this exploration, three ICC hierarchical levels have been used for some 5000 terms. The result is described in the report of Christoph Mak. Prof.Koch regarded a classification degree of almost 50% as a good result, considering that only a shortened version of ICC had been used. In order to reach a better result one would have needed 1–2 years. Also an index of all terms with their codes could be achieved under these explorations.

=== Data Linkage ===
Motivated by the work of an Italian research Group in Trento on Revising the Wordnet Domains Hierarchy: semantics, coverage and balancing, by which the DDC codes were used, Prof. Ernesto William De Luca et al. showed in a study that for such case the use of ICC could lead to essentially better results. This was shown in two contributions: Including knowledge domains from the ICC into the Multilingual Lexical Linked Data Cloud (LLD) and Die Multilingual Lexical Linked Data Cloud: Eine mögliche Zugangsoptimierung?, in which the LLD was used in a meta-model which contains all resources with the possibility of retrieval and navigation of data from different aspects. By this, the existing work about many thousand knowledge fields (of ICC) can be combined with the Multilingual Lexical Linked Data Cloud, based on RDF/OWL representation of EuroWordNet and similar integrated lexical resources (MultiWordNet, MEMODATA and the Hamburg Metapher BD).

=== Semantic Web structuring ===
In October 2013, the computer scientist Hermann Bense, Dortmund, explored the possibilities for structuring the Semanic Web with ICC codes. He developed two approaches for a pictorial presentation of knowledge fields with their possible subdivisions. A graphic representation of those knowledge fields pertaining to the first two levels can be found under Ontology4. The inclusion of the third hierarchical level has been envisaged as the next step.

== Some potential applications of ICC in its present form ==
1. Possibility to roughly structure documents, especially bibliographies and reference works.
2. Structuring personal repertories, e.g. a Who's Who in Who's Who in Classification and Indexing
3. Supporting the recollection of statistics by knowledge fields, e.g. also concerning university professors, statistics of academies, of institutions, of teachers in special education
4. Publishing houses could take up ICC codes for their products to help later sorting by knowledge fields.
5. As a standard classification ICC may be used in many cases, especially in industry, knowledge management and knowledge engineering.
6. With the definition of all its terms a lexicon of knowledge fields could be published. This could also be used for such lexica in other languages.
7. As an example, ICC could be used to compare ongoing scientific activities on a European or world-wide scale.
8. ICC can also be an appropriate tool for switching between extant universal classification systems.
9. ICC can also be a suitable „hang-up system“ for special classification systems, e.g. for special terminological concept systems.
10. ICC in its three hierarchies and corresponding explanations might also be used in higher education to supply the youngsters with an overview of knowledge fields and an understanding of the relationships in the whole of human knowledge.
11. Similar to the Unified Medical Language System (UMLS) for medicine such a Unified System of Knowledge Fields could be held available in many languages and thus reach a global understanding of knowledge fields.
12. The alphabetical index to all knowledge field concepts could be used for comparisons with other such indexes to help in finding the missing fields in the different universal classification systems.
