= Thomas Schmidt (politician) =

German politician (born 1961)

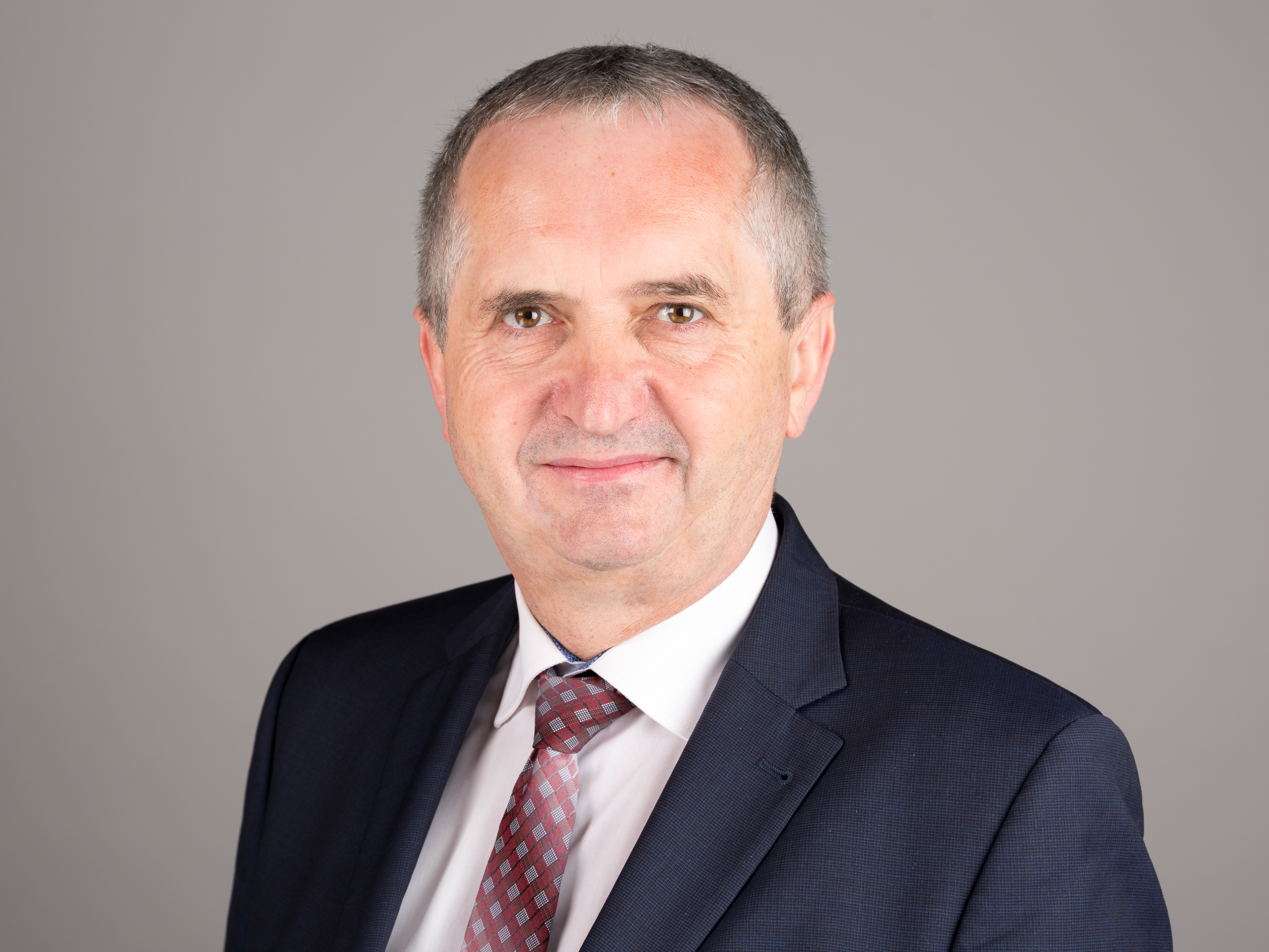
- Schmidt in 2016

Member of the Landtag of Saxony
- Incumbent
- Assumed office 19 October 2004
- Preceded by: Peter Jahr
- Constituency: Mittelsachsen 5 (2004–2024); Mittelsachsen 3 (2024–present)

Personal details
- Born: 7 March 1961 (age 65) Burgstädt
- Party: Christian Democratic Union (since 1990)

Thomas Gottfried Schmidt (born 7 March 1961 in Burgstädt) is a German politician serving as a member of the Landtag of Saxony since 2004. From 2014 to 2019, he served as minister of environment and agriculture of Saxony. From 2019 to 2024, he served as minister of regional development of Saxony.
