= Mittelsachsen 3 =

State electoral district of Germany

19: Mittelsachsen 3
- Electoral district for the Landtag of Saxony
- Mittelsachsen 3 in 2024
- District: Mittelsachsen
- Electorate: 60,971 (2024)
- Major settlements: Burgstädt, Lunzenau, Mittweida, Penig, and Rochlitz

Current electoral district
- Party: CDU
- Member: Thomas Schmidt

Mittelsachsen 3 is an electoral constituency (German: Wahlkreis) represented in the Landtag of Saxony. It elects one member via first-past-the-post voting. Under the constituency numbering system, it is designated as constituency 19. It is within the district of Mittelsachsen.

== Geography ==
The constituency comprises the towns of Burgstädt, Lunzenau, Mittweida, Penig, and Rochlitz, and the districts of Altmittweida, Claußnitz, Erlau, Hartmannsdorf, Königsfeld, Königshain-Wiederau, Lichtenau, Mühlau, Rossau, Seelitz, Taura, Wechselburg, and Zettlitz within Mittelsachsen.

There were 60,971 eligible voters in 2024.

== Members ==
Election	Member	Party	%
2014	Iris Firmenich	CDU	51.3
2019	Iris Firmenich	CDU	37.1
2024	Thomas Schmidt	CDU	40.2

== Election results ==
=== 2024 election ===
State election (2024): Mittelsachsen 3
Notes:	Blue background denotes the winner of the electorate vote. Pink background denotes a candidate elected from their party list. Yellow background denotes an electorate win by a list member, or other incumbent. A ✓ or ✗ denotes status of any incumbent, win or lose respectively.						
Party	Candidate	Votes	%	±%	Party votes	%	±%
CDU	Thomas Schmidt	18,289	40.2	▲3.4	15,487	33.8	▼2.7
AfD	Holger Zielinski	17,355	38.2	▲8.4	14,627	31.9	▲3.1
BSW					6,404	14.0	
FW	Nico Geisler	2,897	6.4	▼0.7	1,263	2.8	▼1.6
Left	Katja Reichel	2,657	5.8	▼4.0	1,265	2.8	▼6.4
SPD	Mario Rolf Lorenz	12,238	4.9	▼1.9	2,746	6.0	▼1.4
Greens	Wolfram Günther	1,061	2.3	▼3.2	1,050	2.3	▼2.5
Freie Sachsen	Orest Meyer	478	1.1		1,325	2.9	
APT					415	0.9	
FDP	Nikita Soldatov	468	1.0	▼3.1	329	0.7	▼3.2
PARTEI					256	0.6	▼0.6
BD					164	0.4	
Values					109	0.2	
Bündnis C					107	0.2	
Pirates					73	0.2	
V-Partei3					57	0.1	
dieBasis					51	0.1	
BüSo					45	0.1	
ÖDP					31	0.1	
Informal votes		744			383		
Total valid votes		45,443			45,804		
Turnout		46,187	75.8	▲7.3			
CDU hold	Majority	934	2.0				

=== 2019 election ===
State election (2019): Mittelsachsen 3
Notes:	Blue background denotes the winner of the electorate vote. Pink background denotes a candidate elected from their party list. Yellow background denotes an electorate win by a list member, or other incumbent. A ✓ or ✗ denotes status of any incumbent, win or lose respectively.						
Party	Candidate	Votes	%	±%	Party votes	%	±%
CDU	✓ Iris Firmenich	12,127	37.1	▼14.2	11,647	35.6	▼10.2
AfD	Holger Zielinski	10,222	31.3		10,017	30.6	▲21.0
Left	Eyk Fechner	3,106	9.5	▼12.3	2,854	8.7	▼9.8
FW	Rico Walter-Bretschneider	2,119	6.5		1,345	4.1	▲3.9
SPD	Oliver Mende	2,078	6.4	▼3.7	2,362	7.2	▼3.7
Greens	Renate Sauer	1,626	5.0	▲0.7	1,470	4.5	▲1.6
FDP	Philipp Hartewig	1,376	4.2	▲0.3	1,321	4.0	▼0.2
APT					525	1.6	▲0.5
PARTEI					382	1.2	▲0.9
Verjüngungsforschung					204	0.6	
NPD					174	0.5	▼4.2
The Blue Party					114	0.3	
Pirates					75	0.2	▼0.6
ÖDP					70	0.2	
Awakening of German Patriots - Central Germany					54	0.2	
Humanists					49	0.1	
PDV					31	0.1	
DKP					26	0.1	
BüSo					10	0.0	▼0.1
Informal votes		485			409		
Total valid votes		32,654			32,730		
Turnout		33,139	67.1	▲17.1			
CDU hold	Majority	1,905	5.8	▼23.7			

=== 2014 election ===
State election (2014): Mittelsachsen 3
Notes:	Blue background denotes the winner of the electorate vote. Pink background denotes a candidate elected from their party list. Yellow background denotes an electorate win by a list member, or other incumbent. A ✓ or ✗ denotes status of any incumbent, win or lose respectively.						
Party	Candidate	Votes	%	±%	Party votes	%	±%
CDU	Iris Firmenich	12,996	51.3		11,670	45.8	
Left		5,529	21.8		4,728	18.5	
SPD		2,554	10.1		2,778	10.9	
AfD					2,441	9.6	
NPD		1,569	6.2		1,192	4.7	
Greens		1,088	4.3		752	2.9	
FDP		980	3.9		977	3.8	
FW					297	1.2	
APT					272	1.1	
Pirates		609	2.4		209	0.8	
PARTEI					88	0.3	
Pro Germany Citizens' Movement					43	0.2	
DSU					32	0.1	
BüSo					29	0.1	
Informal votes		563			380		
Total valid votes		25,325			25,508		
Turnout		25,888	50.0	▼17.2			
CDU win new seat	Majority	7,467	29.5				

== See also ==
- Politics of Saxony
- Landtag of Saxony
