= Richard P. Smiraglia =

American information scientist

- Born: 18 March 1952 (age 74); New York City, New York
- Education: Lewis & Clark College (BA), Indiana University (MLS), University of Chicago (PhD), General Theological Seminary (MDiv)
- Scientific career
- Fields: Information science
- Doctoral advisor: Don R. Swanson

Richard Paul Smiraglia is an American information scientist and prominent figure in the field of knowledge organization. Smiraglia is an emeritus professor in the School of Information Studies at the University of Wisconsin–Milwaukee. He served as editor of the journal Knowledge Organization from 2005 to 2020. He is a cataloging theorist perhaps best known for his work concerning two concepts pertaining to bibliographic control, information retrieval, and knowledge organization: a definition of the meaning of a “work” derived from empirical and semiotic analysis, and “instantiation,” the phenomenon of an information object realized in time.

Smiraglia is also known for his work concerning music description and music information storage and retrieval He earned a Masters of Divinity and was ordained as an Episcopal priest in 1998. Smiraglia has taught at the University of Wisconsin–Milwaukee (2009–13), Long Island University (1993–2009), Columbia University (1987–93), and University of Illinois at Urbana-Champaign (1974–86).

== Early life and education ==
Smiraglia was born in New York City on March 18, 1952, to Marcia Jane Hinds Jacob Smiraglia and guitarist Sylvio Carl Smiraglia (known professionally as Sal Salvador).

He received a B.A. degree in music from Lewis & Clark College in 1973 and his M.L.S. from Indiana University in 1974. He completed a Ph.D. in the Graduate Library School of the University of Chicago in 1992. While on the faculty of Long Island University, he attended the General Theological Seminary, where he received the M.Div. degree in 1997.

== The Nature of “A Work” ==
In The Nature of “A Work”: Implications for the Organization of Knowledge (2001) Smiraglia provides a history of the treatment and role of works (as in literary works, musical works, etc. – intellectual or artistic creations) in catalogs and a survey of empirical research into the work phenomenon. Traditional modern library catalogs, Smiraglia observes, were designed to “inventory (first) and retrieve (second) specific documents,” and were built “on an assumption that there was a correspondence between a book and the work it contained – one item, one work, and vice versa." Works don't equal documents (in book form or otherwise), however; Smiraglia delineates between these two concepts and that of “text”:

“A text is the set of words that constitute a writing. A text is not the same as a document, which is the physical container (an item) on which the text is recorded… A work is the set of ideas created probably by an author or perhaps a composer, or other artist, set into a document using text, with the intention of being communicated to a receiver… A work may have many texts and may appear in many different documents.”

The problems with assuming a one-to-one document/work correspondence started to become apparent by the middle of the twentieth century when an explosion of information in the century's first half and the publishing industry together yielded a “multiplicity of editions of major works.” The idea began to take hold that a work – a set of abstract ideational content – is greater than a single a book or document and is actually a collection of sporadically varying instantiations of that ideational content.

Many attempts followed to define work and the relationships between it and the various instances and forms in which it appears. One of the best known is the FRBR entity-relationship model, which Smiraglia credits with providing “the separate identification, for the first time in the history of bibliographic control, of ‘the work’ as an essential and distinct bibliographic entity.” In the FRBR model, a work is a distinct intellectual or artistic creation (for instance, Shakespeare's Romeo and Juliet); an expression is an intellectual or artistic realization of a work (the original language text of the play); a manifestation physically embodies a work’s expression (a 2007 edition of the First Quarto of Romeo and Juliet from Cambridge University Press); and an item is a single exemplar of a manifestation (a single copy of the edition of Romeo and Juliet just mentioned).

Through empirical and semiotic analysis of the work phenomenon, Smiraglia derives a somewhat more complex definition: “A work is a signifying, concrete set of ideational conceptions that finds realization through semantic or symbolic expression.” In this conception, the work is not a purely abstract entity; it still represents abstract intellectual or artistic content, but it can only be perceived and considered through instances of its realization – the texts in which it finds expression. Works and texts, the ideational content and semantic content, are inextricably linked. Smiraglia finds an analogy in linguistics and semiotics. Much as with Saussure's linguistic sign, in which the signified (concept) and signifier (sound-images) combine to form a linguistic object, ideational content (concepts) couples with semantic content (text or symbolic images) to form an object of cultural communication. And just as linguistic signifiers evolve over time, subject to the vicissitudes of the culture in which they occur and the changing perceptions of their receivers, the texts that express a work are likewise volatile and subject to the same vicissitudes, making the work and its cultural signification similarly mutable.

== Instantiation ==
Closely tied to this definition of work is the concept of instantiation, which could be understood as “version,” “edition,” or “manifestation”; Smiraglia selects instantiation over those other terms, however, since the word denotes temporality: “an instantiation is essentially a manifestation at a specific point in time.” And for Smiraglia, there is no intermediate expression level, as in the FRBR model, between work and instantiation (manifestation). There are only different types of instantiations.

A work may find realization in a variety of different texts or other forms of semantic or symbolic expression, and this typically occurs once the work has acquired cultural significance and enters the canon. Romeo and Juliet, for instance, has spawned countless editions, an opera, several films, adaptations like West Side Story, and so forth. (And 30% to 60% of works in the general bibliographic population have generated families or networks of such related instantiations.) Some forms of instantiation are merely derivative, with the ideational and semantic content of the work remaining unchanged; these include simultaneous and successive editions, amplifications, and extractions. In other forms, such as translations, adaptations, and performances, ideational and semantic content experiences mutation. A mutation represents a work as a collaborative entity originating from the reaction of a culture (situated in a particular time and place) to that work. As the network of instantiations stemming from a work mutates over time, the work's cultural meaning changes accordingly.

== Publications ==
=== Books ===
- Smiraglia, Richard (1986) [1983]. Cataloging music: A manual for use with AACR 2 (2nd ed.). Lake Crystal, Minn.: Soldier Creek Press. ISBN 9780936996196.
- Smiraglia, Richard (1989). Music cataloging: The bibliographic control of printed and recorded music in libraries. Englewood, Colo.: Libraries Unlimited. ISBN 9780872874251.
- Smiraglia, Richard (1992). Authority control and the extent of derivative bibliographic relationships (PhD thesis). University of Chicago.
- Smiraglia, Richard; Pavlovsky, Taras (1997) [1983]. Describing music materials: A manual for use with AACR2 and APPM (3rd ed.). Lake Crystal, MN: Soldier Creek Press. ISBN 9780936996752.
- Smiraglia, Richard (2001). The nature of a "work": Implications for the organization of knowledge. Lanham, MD: Scarecrow Press. ISBN 9780810840379.
- Smiraglia, Richard (2002). Works as entities for information retrieval. Binghamton, NY: Haworth Information Press. ISBN 9780789020208.
- Smiraglia, Richard; Young, J. Bradford (2005). Bibliographic control of music: A retrospective bibliography, 1882–2000. Lanham, Md.: Scarecrow Press for the Music Library Association. ISBN 9780810851337.
- Smiraglia, Richard (2005). Metadata: A cataloger's primer. Binghamton, NY: Haworth Information Press. ISBN 9780789028006.
- Smiraglia, Richard (2007) [1981]. Shelflisting music: Guidelines for use with the Library of Congress classification, M (2nd ed.). Lanham, Md.: Scarecrow Press for the Music Library Association. ISBN 9780810854185.
- Smiraglia, Richard (2014). Cultural synergy in information institutions. Springer: New York. ISBN 9781493912490.
- Smiraglia, Richard (2014). The elements of knowledge organization. Cham: Springer. ISBN 9783319093574.
- Smiraglia, Richard (2015). Domain analysis for knowledge organization: Tools for ontology extraction. Waldham, MA: Chandos Publishing. ISBN 9780081001882.
- Smiraglia, Richard; Beak, Jihee (2017) [1983]. Describing music materials: A manual for resource description of printed and recorded music and music videos (4th ed.). Lanham, Md.: Libraries Unlimited. ISBN 9781442276291.

=== Articles ===
- Leazer, Gregory; Smiraglia, Richard (1999). "Bibliographic families in the library catalog : A qualitative analysis and grounded theory". Library Resources & Technical Services. 43 (4): 191–212.
- Smiraglia, Richard (2001). "Further progress toward theory in knowledge organization". Canadian Journal of Information and Library Science. 26 (2–3): 31–50.
- Smiraglia, Richard (2001). "Works as signs, symbols, and canons: The epistemology of the work". Knowledge Organization. 28 (4): 192–202.
- Smiraglia, Richard (2002). "Further reflections on the nature of "a work": An introduction". Cataloging & Classification Quarterly. 33 (3/4): 1–11.
- Smiraglia, Richard (2003). "The history of "the work" in the modern catalog". Cataloging & Classification Quarterly. 53 (3/4): 557. doi:10.1300/J104v35n03_13.
- Smiraglia, Richard (2007). "Bibliographic families and superworks". In Taylor, Arlene (ed.). Understanding FRBR: What it is and how it will affect our retrieval tools. Westport, CT: Libraries Unlimited. pp. 73–86.
- Smiraglia, Richard (2012). "Epistemology of domain analysis". In Smiraglia, Richard; Lee, Huri-Li (eds.). Cultural frames of knowledge. Würzburg: Ergon. ISBN 9783899139181.
- Smiraglia, Richard; Graf, Ann (2017). "From music cataloging to the organization of knowledge: An interview with Richard P. Smiraglia". Cataloging & Classification Quarterly. 55 (5): 288–69.
- Smiraglia, Richard (2019). "Trajectories for research: Fathoming the promise of the NARCIS classification". Knowledge Organization. 46 (5): 337.
- Gnoli, Claudio; Smiraglia, Richard; Szostak, Rick (2024). "Phenomenon‐based classification: An Annual Review of Information Science and Technology (ARIST) paper". Journal of the American Society for Information Science and Technology. 75 (3): 324–43.
