= Yetunde Abosede Zaid =

Nigerian librarian (born 1969)

Professor Yetunde Abosede Zaid
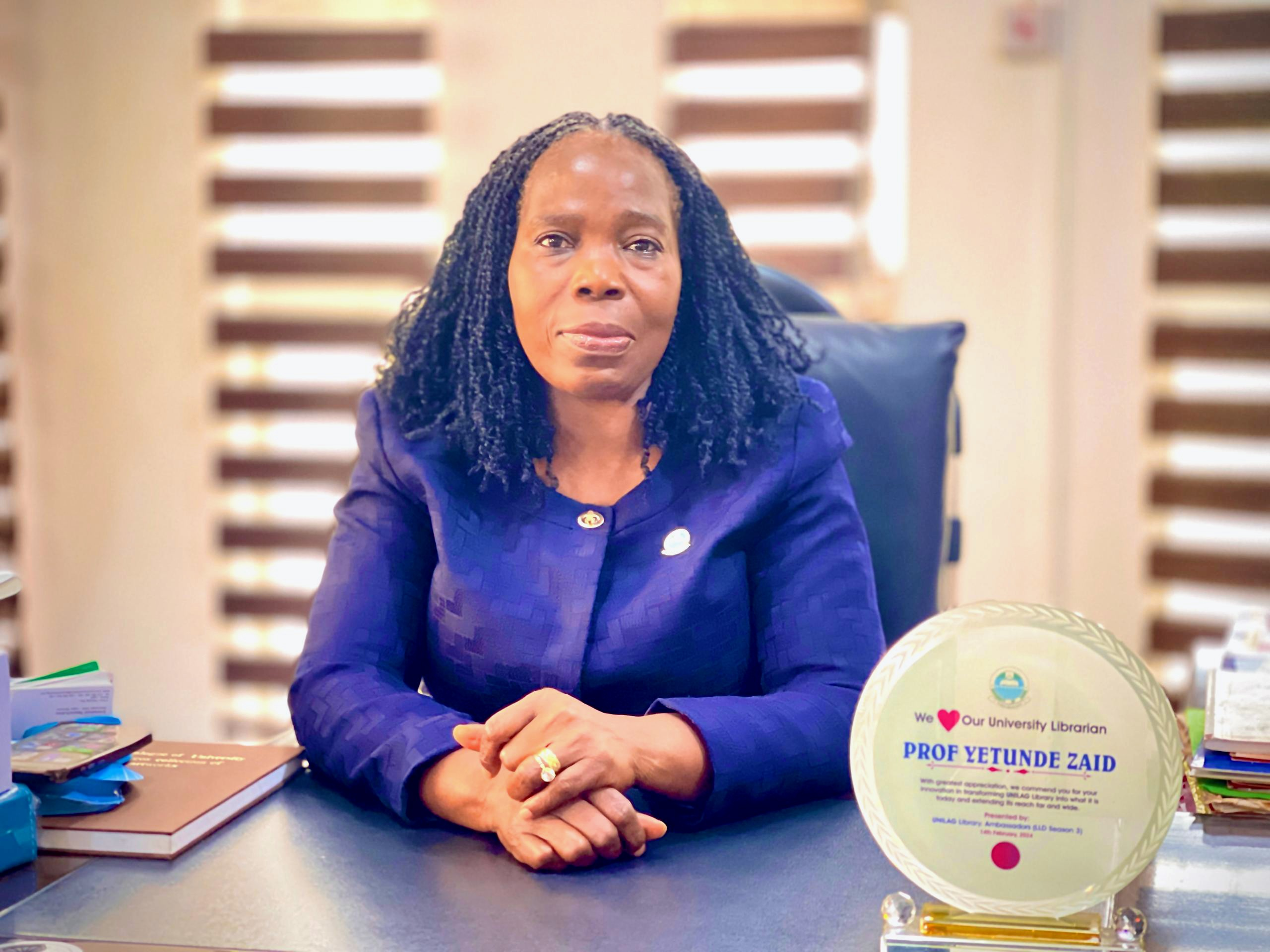
- Born: 22 September 1969 (age 56); Lagos, Lagos State, Nigeria
- Education: Olabisi Onabanjo University; University of Ibadan
- Occupation: Librarian
- Employer: University of Lagos

Professor Yetunde Abosede Zaid (born 22 September 1969) is a Nigerian librarian. She is the first Professor of Library and Information Sciences at the University of Lagos, and served as the University Librarian from 2019 - 2025.

== Early life and education ==
Zaid was born on 22 September 1969, in Lagos. She holds a Bachelor of Arts degree from Ogun State University (now Olabisi Onabanjo University) in 1992. Building upon this foundation, she pursued further studies, obtaining her master's degree in 1997 and Ph.D. in 2011, in Library and Information Studies from the University of Ibadan.

== Career ==
Zaid is the secretary of the Lagos Studies Association and she is a member of American Library Association, African Librarians Council, International Society for Knowledge Organisation, Reference and User Services of the American Library Association, African Studies Association and Nigerian Library Association, where she served as Chairperson of the Lagos State Chapter from 2013 to 2015.

Zaid joined the University of Lagos in July 2002 as a Librarian II and ascended the rank of Librarian I in 2010, she became a senior Librarian in 2013; and Reader Librarian in 2016. On 14 March 2019, she was appointed University of Lagos Librarian. She won the African Research Fulbright fellowship in 2016 and spent nine months at the James S. Coleman Africa Studies Center, University of California-Los Angeles, United States. Her research interests encompass a diverse array of topics, including information resource management, information service delivery, and gender studies. Notably, she is actively involved in research project aimed at developing inclusive educational and library service delivery policies for visually impaired students in Nigeria. With over 20 years of professional experience in managing information services, she has authored over 30 publications in esteemed journals of Library and Information Studies, earning recognition for her impactful contributions to the development of Library and Information Sciences in Nigeria.

== Works ==
Academic publications

- Quality of life among rural Nigerian women: The role of information
- Documenting and disseminating agricultural indigenous knowledge for sustainable food security: The efforts of agricultural research libraries in Nigeria
- Sustaining open educational resources (OER) initiatives in Nigerian universities
- A study of internally generated revenue (IGR) by University Libraries in Nigeria
- Automating Library Records using Glas Software: University of Lagos Experience
- Museums, libraries and archives: collaborating for the preservation of heritage materials in Nigeria
- Documenting and disseminating agricultural indigenous knowledge for sustainable food security: The efforts of agricultural research libraries in Nigeria
- Information provision for students with visual impairments in Nigerian universities: Charting a course from project to service delivery
- The Exclusion of Persons with Visual Impairment in Nigerian Academic Libraries' Websites
- Needs and sources of information for women in the treatment and management of breast cancer in Lagos State, Nigeria
- Creativity and innovations in Nigerian Academic libraries: Implications for library development
- The use of the internet for cataloguing and classification of library materials
- Information accessibility, utilisation and socio-economic variables as predictors of quality of life of rural women in Ekiti State, Nigeria
- Building collaboration for an institutional repository in Africa: transcending barriers, creating opportunities
- Library development in selected private secondary schools in Lagos State
- Effective Leadership, Self Efficacy, Emotional Intelligence, Information Acquisition and Utilization of Mnagers in Packaging Companies in Nigeria
- Training in cultural heritage preservation: The experiences of heritage institutions in Nigeria
- Information accessibility and utilization as correlate of quality of life of rural women in Nigeria
- High blood pressure awareness among residents in Lagos State, Nigeria: The role of librarians in the dissemination of health information
- An assessment of the role of libraries in poverty alleviation among the youth in Lagos State, Nigeria
- What Is Good For The Goose is Good For The Gander
- OER Accessibility for Students with Visual Disabilities in Higher Education in the Era of Open Knowledge.
- Awareness and Utilization of Computer-based Library Services by Final Year Students in the University of Lagos, Library and Information Practitioner
- The E-book Evolution: Formats and Design
