= Rick Szostak =

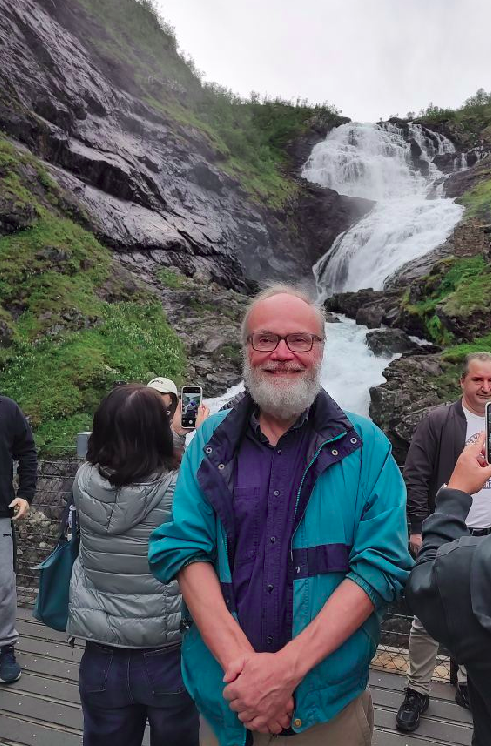
Rick Szostak in 2025

Rick Szostak (born October 27, 1959) is a Canadian economist and interdisciplinary scholar best known for his work in economic history, interdisciplinarity, and knowledge organization.

He is Professor Emeritus of Economics at the University of Alberta, where he taught for nearly four decades and served as Chair of the Department of Economics.

He is former president of International Society for Knowledge Organization and served on the board of the Association for Interdisciplinary Studies for ten years and held the position of president from 2011 to 2014.

He has authored or co-authored more than twenty books, including Introduction to Interdisciplinary Studies and Interdisciplinary Research: Process and Theory.

== Education and career ==
Szostak received his Bachelor of Arts from McGill University and completed his Ph.D. in economics at Northwestern University. He joined the Department of Economics at the University of Alberta in 1985 and remained a faculty member until his retirement in 2023.

Throughout his career, he held several leadership positions, including Associate Dean in the Faculty of Arts from 2002 to 2005 and Chair of the Department of Economics from 2017 to 2022. He also served as President of the Association of Academic Staff at the University of Alberta and the Confederation of Alberta Faculty Associations in the 1990s.

He participated in study-abroad programs in Italy and offered short courses internationally, including at the College of Europe and the University of Salento.

He served on the board of the Association for Interdisciplinary Studies for ten years, including a term as president from 2011 to 2014. From 2018 to 2022, he was president of the International Society for Knowledge Organization.

He has also been affiliated with the Economics Society of Northern Alberta, serving as its president in 2017 and 2018, as well as with various interdisciplinary programs at the University of Alberta, including Humanities Computing, Science, Technology and Society, and Religious Studies.

== Scholarly work ==
Rick Szostak's scholarship spans a wide range of disciplines, with a sustained emphasis on integrating diverse forms of knowledge. His work is rooted in the belief that complex societal and policy challenges such as climate change, democratic instability, and global inequality require interdisciplinary approaches that synthesize insights across traditional disciplinary boundaries.

Trained as an economic historian, Szostak's early research focused on industrialization, transportation, and economic development. He authored books addressing two of the central questions in the field: the causes of the Industrial Revolution and of the Great Depression. The Role of Transportation in the Industrial Revolution: A Comparison of England and France (McGill-Queen's, 1991) argued that improvements to transport systems were critical in fomenting industrialization, highlighting how the emergence of common carrier networks in the mid-18th century enabled firms to sell by sample or catalog, which in turn encouraged the concentration of workers and subsequent mechanization.

In Technological Innovation and the Great Depression (Westview Press, 1995), he contended that a combination of widespread labor-saving process innovations and a dearth of new product innovations in the interwar period played a key role in deepening the Depression.

His publications include Making Sense of the Future and Restoring Democratic Stability: A Backcasting Wheel Approach, which apply interdisciplinary analysis to urgent policy questions and propose forward-looking strategies grounded in both empirical evidence and theoretical synthesis.

In Making Sense of World History recognized as the first open-access world history textbook written by an economist Szostak develops organizing devices to achieve coherence and pursues interdisciplinary integration across diverse types of analysis, offering a coherent global narrative.

His co-authored textbooks, Introduction to Interdisciplinary Studies and Interdisciplinary Research: Process and Theory, are widely used in undergraduate and graduate programs that incorporate interdisciplinary studies.

He has also contributed to interdisciplinary pedagogy and program development through his work with the Association for Interdisciplinary Studies (AIS), where he served as president, as well as through his involvement in university-wide initiatives.

Szostak's "Manifesto of Interdisciplinarity" outlines the core principles of interdisciplinary scholarship and argues for its relevance in academic research, public policy, and education. He articulates interdisciplinarity as a practice of integration that complements and extends disciplinary knowledge, providing tools for creative problem-solving and intellectual openness.

In the field of knowledge organization, Szostak has advanced theories of classification, particularly about causal and non-causal relationships.

== Selected bibliography ==
=== Books ===
- Szostak, Rick (2014). Role of Transportation in the Industrial Revolution: A Comparison of England and France. Montreal: McGill-Queen's University Press. ISBN 978-0-7735-0840-8.
- Szostak, Rick (1995). Technological Innovation And The Great Depression (1st ed.). Routledge. p. 384. doi:10.4324/9780429308352. ISBN 9780429308352.
- Szostak, Rick (2004). Classifying science: phenomena, data, theory, method, practice. Information science and knowledge management. Dordrecht: Springer. ISBN 978-1-4020-3094-9.
- Szostak, Rick (2009-03-02). The Causes of Economic Growth: Interdisciplinary Perspectives. Springer Science & Business Media. ISBN 978-3-540-92282-7.
- Repko, Allen; Newell, William; Szostak, Rick (2012). Case Studies in Interdisciplinary Research. Teller Road, Thousand Oaks California, United States: SAGE Publications, Inc. doi:10.4135/9781483349541. ISBN 978-1-4129-8248-1.
- Szostak, Rick (2016). Interdisciplinary Knowledge Organization. Claudio Gnoli, María López-Huertas. Cham: Springer International Publishing AG. ISBN 978-3-319-30147-1.
- Szostak, Rick (2022). Making Sense of the Future. Erscheinungsort nicht ermittelbar: Taylor & Francis. ISBN 978-1-003-18685-4.
- Szostak, Rick (2020-10-22), "Making sense of world history", Making Sense of World History, London: Routledge, pp. 3–33, doi:10.4324/9781003013518-2, ISBN 978-1-003-01351-8
- Szostak, Rick (2022-09-22). Integrating the Human Sciences. London: Routledge. doi:10.4324/9781003275237. ISBN 978-1-003-27523-7.
- Szostak, Rick (2024-09-17), "Introduction to the Handbook of Interdisciplinary Teaching and Administration", Handbook of Interdisciplinary Teaching and Administration, Edward Elgar Publishing, pp. 1–11, doi:10.4337/9781035309870.00007, ISBN 978-1-0353-0987-0
- Cross, Gary S.; Szostak, Rick (2018). Technology and American society: a history (3rd ed.). New York, NY: Routledge. p. 388. ISBN 978-1-351-24911-9.
- Repko, Allen F.; Szostak, Rick (2025-02-21). Interdisciplinary Research: Process and Theory (5th ed.). SAGE Publications. ISBN 978-1-0718-8427-0.

=== Journals ===
- Szostak, Rick (2008-04-25). "Classification, interdisciplinarity, and the study of science". Journal of Documentation. 64 (3): 319–332. doi:10.1108/00220410810867551. ISSN 0022-0418.
- Szostak, Rick (2013). "The State of the Field: Interdisciplinary Research". Issues in Interdisciplinary Studies: 44–65. doi:10.7939/R3QB9V49Q.
- Szostak, R. (2002). "How to Do Interdisciplinarity: Integrating the Debate". Issues in Integrative Studies. doi:10.7939/r3mp4vv2c.
- Szostak, Rick (2011). "Complex concepts into basic concepts". Journal of the American Society for Information Science and Technology. 62 (11): 2247–2265. doi:10.1002/asi.21635. ISSN 1532-2890.
- Szostak, R. (2007). "How and Why to Teach Interdisciplinary Research Practice". Journal of Research Practice. 3 (40).
- Szostak, Rick (2015-08-06). Hesse-Biber, Sharlene Nagy; Johnson, R. Burke (eds.). "Interdisciplinary and Transdisciplinary Multimethod and Mixed Methods Research". Oxford Handbooks Online. doi:10.1093/oxfordhb/9780199933624.013.51.
- Szostak, Rick (2012), "The Interdisciplinary Research Process", Case Studies in Interdisciplinary Research, Teller Road, Thousand Oaks California, United States: SAGE Publications, Inc., pp. 3–20, doi:10.4135/9781483349541.n1, ISBN 978-1-4129-8248-1
