= Hope A. Olson =

- Born: Watertown, South Dakota
- Education: Gustavus Adolphus College, University of Toronto, University of Wisconsin, Madison
- Scientific career
- Fields: Information science
- Workplaces: University of Wisconsin–Milwaukee

Hope A. Olson is Professor Emerita at the School of Information Studies at the University of Wisconsin–Milwaukee. She was previously a professor at the University of Alberta.

From 2000 to 2004 Olson was the editor-in-chief for Knowledge Organization and she currently serves on its editorial board. She also serves on the editorial board of the Journal of Library Metadata. Olson has authored or co-authored over thirty peer-reviewed articles and book chapters, and has published three books: Subject Analysis in Online Catalogs, 2nd ed., co-authored by John J. Boll (Libraries Unlimited, 2001); Information Sources in Women's Studies and Feminism, editor (KG Saur, 2002); and The Power to Name: Locating the Limits of Subject Representation in Libraries (Kluwer Academic, 2002).

She received a B.A. from Gustavus Adolphus College, an M.L.S. from the University of Toronto, and a Ph.D. (1996) from the University of Wisconsin–Madison.

Olson's research focuses on critical analysis of subject representations and classification systems. Using feminist, poststructural, and postcolonial perspectives, she examines the biases inherent in hierarchical organizational structures.

== Critical analysis of library classification ==
Olson draws on deconstructive theory to question the functionality and legitimacy of traditional knowledge organization. Employing Drucilla Cornell’s adaptation of deconstruction (“the philosophy of the limit”), Olson examines the marginalization imposed by the structural limitations of library catalogs. In her research, Olson explores the ethical consequences of inadequate representation and emphasizes the desirability of using knowledge organization as a change agent for the enrichment of users.

== Feminist approaches to knowledge organization ==
A central tenet of Olson's writing is the overshadowing effect of a patriarchal worldview on organization systems within the Western world. In the 2001 article "Sameness and Difference: A Cultural Foundation of Classification," Olson describes how the dichotomous principles of Western philosophical heritage create classification systems which privilege the mainstream, majority view. She argues in favor of a less hierarchical and more contextual and interconnected structure of knowledge, employing Belenky, Clinchy, Goldberger and Tarule's concept of connected knowing.

== The Power to Name ==
Olson's most notable work is her 2002 book The Power to Name: Locating the Limits of Subject Representation in Libraries. In it she provides historical context to modern library classification by reviewing writings by library classification pioneers Melvil Dewey and Charles Cutter, highlighting the rigid universality they found desirable to achieve consistency and control. Olson argues that Dewey and Cutter’s insistence on a universal language is “a harmful characteristic in the sense that it marginalizes and excludes Others – concepts outside of a white, male, Eurocentric, Christocentric, heterosexual, able-bodied, bourgeois mainstream.” Olson goes on to illustrate shortcomings of applied subject headings by analyzing selected Dewey Decimal Classification and Library of Congress Subject Headings representing concepts of gender, race, and ethnicity. She concludes with a call for a more "eccentric" approach to subject access, including techniques to "breach the limits" of library classification systems by making them more permeable, open, and dynamic.

== Recent research ==
Olson's later research further explored the gender bias within the Aristotelian logic that informs traditional classification and syndetic structures. She has also collaborated in research addressing consistency in the assignment of indexing terms.
