= University of Wisconsin–Milwaukee School of Information Studies =

Academic unit of the University of Wisconsin–Milwaukee

Coordinates: 43°04′40.7″N 87°53′05.8″W

School of Information Studies (SOIS)
- Former names: School of Library and Information Studies
- Motto: Information our focus, International our scope, Interdisciplinary our mindset.
- Interim Dean: Dr. Mark Harris
- Undergraduates: 475
- Postgraduates: 445
- Doctoral students: 23
- Location: Milwaukee, Wisconsin, United States
- Campus: University of Wisconsin–Milwaukee
- Website: https://uwm.edu/informationstudies/
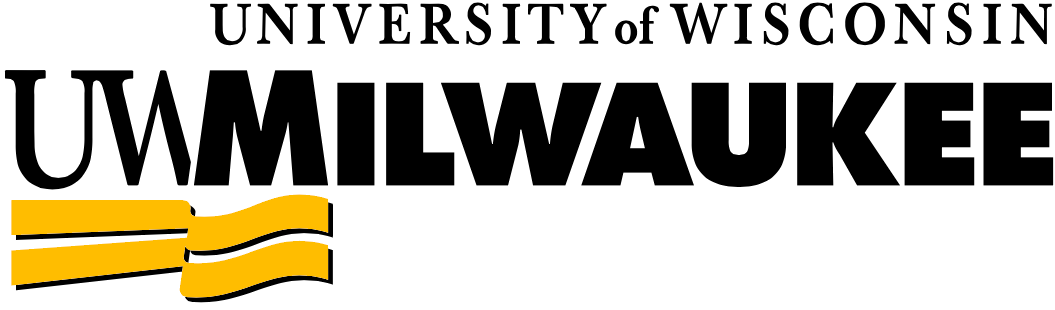

The School of Information Studies (SOIS) is an academic unit of the University of Wisconsin–Milwaukee. SOIS is a member of the iSchools consortium, and an observer of the World Intellectual Property Organization (WIPO).

== Academic programs ==
- Bachelor of Science in Information Science & Technology (BSIST)
- Master of Science in Information Science & Technology (MSIST)
- Master of Library & Information Science (MLIS)
- Ph.D. in Information Studies

== Research groups ==
The school houses UW-Milwaukee's Center for Information Policy Research, Research Group for Information Retrieval, Information Intelligence and Architecture Research Lab, the Knowledge Organization Research Group (KOrg), and the Social Studies of Information Research Group (SSIRG).

== Rankings ==
In 2013 U.S. News & World Report ranked the school 15th nationally among Library and Information Science schools. SOIS ranks 4th internationally and 2nd in the US/Canada in department contributions to library and information science (LIS) literature (2007 - 2012) as reported in a recent study in the Journal of the Association for Information Science and Technology by Walters & Wilder.

The school was recognized by UNESCO as one of the "leading international academic institutions" for its "ongoing role in promoting e-government and information ethics initiatives in Africa" in 2009.

== Notable people ==
- Peter Johan Lor, adjunct instructor
- Hope A. Olson, professor emeritus
- Richard P. Smiraglia, professor emeritus
