= Gerhard Wahrig =

German linguist (1923–1978)

Gerhard Wahrig (10 May 1923 in Burgstädt, Saxony, Germany – 2 September 1978 in Wiesbaden Hesse, Germany) was a German linguist and lexicographer. He also worked on semantics and grammar.

His main work is the Deutsches Wörterbuch (German Dictionary, also referred to as Der Wahrig, 1st edition in 1966), which had been revised and updated under the direction of his daughter Dr. Renate Wahrig-Burfeind since 1986. German publisher Wissenmedia Group published the last print edition (9th) in 2011, gave up book trading in February 2014, and closed business several years later.
