= Burgstädt =

- Town
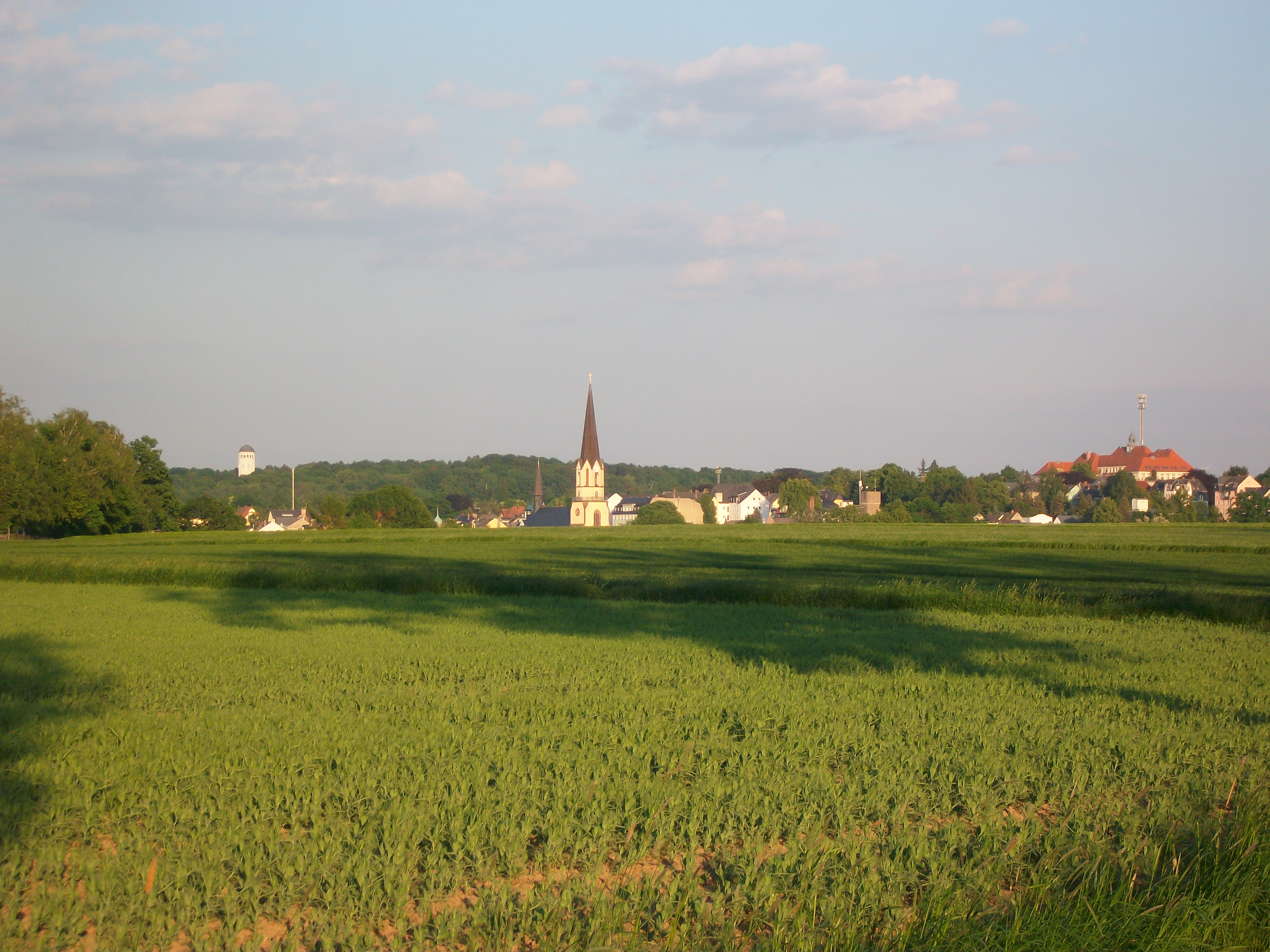
- Burgstädt

- Coat of arms

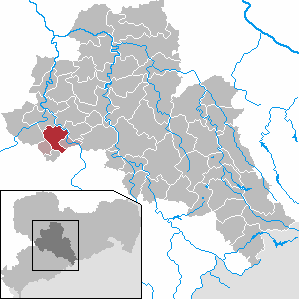
- Location of Burgstädt within Mittelsachsen district
- Interactive map of Burgstädt
- Location within Germany Location within Saxony
- Coordinates: 50°55′N 12°49′E
- Country: Germany
- State: Saxony
- District: Mittelsachsen

Government
  - Mayor (2022–29): Lars Naumann (FW)

Area
  - Total: 25.88 km^{2} (9.99 sq mi)
- Elevation: 311 m (1,020 ft)

Population (2025-12-31)
  - Total: 10,333
  - Density: 399.3/km^{2} (1,034/sq mi)
- Time zone: UTC+01:00 (CET)
  - Summer (DST): UTC+02:00 (CEST)
- Postal codes: 09217
- Dialling codes: 037 24
- Vehicle registration: FG (former: MW)
- Website: www.burgstaedt.de

Burgstädt (German pronunciation: [ˈbʊʁkʃtɛt]) is a town in the district of Mittelsachsen, in Saxony, Germany. It is situated 12 km northwest of Chemnitz.

== Sons and daughters of the city ==
- Erich Gleixner (1920-1962), footballer
- Peter Jahr (born 1959), politician (CDU)
- Barbara Köhler (born 1959), lyricist
- Rico Lieder (born 1971), athlete
- Gerhard Wahrig (1923-1978), lexicographer
