= International Society for Knowledge Organization =

International professional association for scholars of knowledge organization

- Abbreviation: ISKO
- Formation: 1989; 37 years ago
- Founder: Ingetraut Dahlberg
- Legal status: Active
- Region served: World
- President: Thiago Henrique Bragato Barros
- Past-President: Rick Szostak
- Treasurer: Athena Salaba
- Secretary: David Haynes
- Board of directors: Lu An (CHINA) Claudio Gnoli (University of Pavia, Italy) [ex-officio as Webmaster] Birger Hjørland (Royal School of LIS, Copenhagen, Denmark) [as SAC Chair] Athena Salaba (Kent State University, Kent, USA) [as Treasurer] Richard P. Smiraglia (University of Wisconsin, Milwaukee, USA); Rick Szostak (University of Alberta, Edmonton, Canada) [as President] Thiago Barros (Federal University of Rio Grande do Sul, Brazil) [as President] Marcia Lei Zeng (Kent State University, Kent, USA)
- Affiliations: UNESCO, European Commission, ISO, IFLA, ASIS&T SIG/CR, NKOS, Infoterm
- Website: http://www.isko.org/index.php

The International Society for Knowledge Organization, or ISKO, is a professional association for scholars of knowledge organization, knowledge structures, classification studies, and information organization and structure.

== Publications ==
The Society publishes the academic journal Knowledge Organization as the official bi-monthly journal of ISKO. Founded in 1973 by Dr. Ingetraut Dahlberg, the first President of ISKO, it began publication the following year under the banner International Classification. In 1993 the title was changed to its present form. The journal publishes original research articles relating to general ordering theory, philosophical foundations of knowledge and its artifacts, theoretical bases of classification, data analysis and reduction. It also describes practical operations associated with indexing and classification. In addition to being a technical resource, the journal traces the history of knowledge organization and discusses questions of education and training in classification.

=== Encyclopedia of Knowledge Organization ===
Since 2016, ISKO has published the Encyclopedia of Knowledge Organization (IEKO), edited by Birger Hjorland and Claudio Gnoli. This work covers the history and development of different approaches to knowledge, core concepts in the space, comparisons of different systems and processes, and examples from current practice in regional and global projects.

The organization also holds biennial international conferences.

== Chapters ==
ISKO officially recognizes regional chapters in Brazil, Canada and the United States, China, France, Germany (including Austria and Switzerland), India, Italy, Maghreb (including Tunisia + Algeria + Morocco), Poland, Singapore, Spain (including Portugal), the United Kingdom, and West Africa. ISKO cooperates with international and national organizations such as UNESCO, the European Commission, the International Organization for Standardization, the International Federation of Library Associations and Institutions, the Association for Information Science and Technology, the Networked Knowledge Organization Systems/Services, and the International Information Centre for Terminology.

== Other reading ==
Dahlberg, Ingetraut (2010) International Society for Knowledge Organization (ISKO), Encyclopedia of Library and Information Sciences, Third Edition, 1: 1, 2941 — 2949.
