= Knowledge Organization (journal) =

- Discipline: Information science
- Language: English
- Edited by: Natália Bolfarini Tognoli

Publication details
- Former name: International Classification
- History: 1974–present
- Publisher: IMR Press (2025–). Previously Ergon Verlag on behalf of the International Society for Knowledge Organization
- Frequency: 8/year
- Impact factor: 0.559 (2018)

Standard abbreviations
- ISO 4: Knowl. Organ.

Indexing
- CODEN: KNOREM
- ISSN: 0943-7444
- LCCN: 94652101
- OCLC no.: 27958157

Links
- Journal homepage; Journal page at society website

Knowledge Organization: International Journal devoted to Concept Theory, Classification, Indexing, and Knowledge Representation is a peer-reviewed academic journal covering knowledge organization, including concept theory, classification, indexing, and knowledge representation. It is published by Ergon Verlag on behalf of the International Society for Knowledge Organization and was published under the title International Classification between 1974 and 1993. It was established in 1974 with Ingetraut Dahlberg as founding editor-in-chief.

Since 2025 it has been published by IMR Press.

== Abstracting and indexing ==
The journal is abstracted and or indexed in Current Contents/Social & Behavioral Sciences, Social Sciences Citation Index, Inspec, Library and Information Science Abstracts, PASCAL, Referativny Zhurnal Informatika, and Sociological Abstracts. According to the Journal Citation Reports, the journal has a 2017 impact factor of 0.559.

== See also ==
- Document classification
- Knowledge organization
- Subject (documents)
