= Leipzig 4 =

State electoral district of Germany

28: Leipzig 4
- Electoral district for the Landtag of Saxony
- Leipzig 4 in 2024
- District: Leipzig
- Electorate: 58,899 (2024)
- Major settlements: City-district Süd, and sub-districts of Probstheida and Meusdorf (Südost)

Current electoral district
- Party: De Linke
- Member: Juliane Nagel

Leipzig 4 is an electoral constituency (German: Wahlkreis) represented in the Landtag of Saxony. It elects one member via first-past-the-post voting. Under the constituency numbering system, it is designated as constituency 28. It is within the city of Leipzig.

== Geography ==
The constituency comprises the district of Süd, and the sub-districts of Probstheida and Meusdorf of district Südost within the City of Leipzig.

There were 58,899 eligible voters in 2024.

== Members ==
Election	Member	Party	%
2014	Sebastian Gemkow	CDU	24.9
2019	Claudia Maicher	Grüne	26.9
2024	Juliane Nagel	De Linke	36.5

== Election results ==
=== 2024 election ===
State election (2024): Leipzig 4
Notes:	Blue background denotes the winner of the electorate vote. Pink background denotes a candidate elected from their party list. Yellow background denotes an electorate win by a list member, or other incumbent. A ✓ or ✗ denotes status of any incumbent, win or lose respectively.						
Party	Candidate	Votes	%	±%	Party votes	%	±%
Left	Juliane Nagel	17,406	36.5	▲7.8	8,938	18.7	▼2.2
CDU	Jessica Steiner	10,477	22.0	▲1.4	11,283	23.6	▲1.3
AfD	Alexander Wiesner	6,291	13.2	▲1.2	5,973	12.5	▲0.6
BSW	Matthias Jung	3,984	8.3		4,648	9.7	
Greens	Gesine Märtens	3,940	8.3	▼11.4	7,349	15.4	▼7.1
SPD	Gerald Eisenblätter	3,447	7.2	▼2.3	6,518	13.6	▲3.0
PARTEI	Thomas Kumbernuß	1,058	2.2	▼2.1	806	1.7	▼1.8
FW	Christian Martin Clemen	729	1.5	▼1.0	593	1.2	▼0.5
APT					419	0.9	
FDP	Shehzad Shaikh	390	0.8	▼2.0	402	0.8	▼2.2
Freie Sachsen					333	0.7	
Pirates					189	0.4	
dieBasis					90	0.2	
V-Partei3					84	0.2	
BD					75	0.2	
Values					57	0.1	
ÖDP					42	0.1	
Bündnis C					29	0.1	
BüSo					23	0.0	
Informal votes		385			256		
Total valid votes		47,722			47,851		
Turnout		48,107	80.3	▲11.0			
Left win new seat	Majority	6,929	14.5				

=== 2019 election ===
State election (2019): Leipzig 4
Notes:	Blue background denotes the winner of the electorate vote. Pink background denotes a candidate elected from their party list. Yellow background denotes an electorate win by a list member, or other incumbent. A ✓ or ✗ denotes status of any incumbent, win or lose respectively.						
Party	Candidate	Votes	%	±%	Party votes	%	±%
Greens	Claudia Maicher	11,848	26.9	▲10.7	10,709	24.3	▲8.4
Left	Marco Böhme	10,741	24.4	▲0.6	7,796	17.7	▼4.4
CDU	Michael Weickert	8,813	20.0	▼4.9	9,463	21.4	▼4.7
AfD	Falk-Gert Pasemann	6,300	14.3	▲7.8	6,153	13.9	▲7.5
SPD	Irena Rudolph-Kokot	3,071	7.0	▼10.0	4,137	9.4	▼7.0
PARTEI					1,596	3.6	▲1.7
FDP	Judith Münch	1,650	3.7	▲1.4	1,596	3.6	▲0.6
FW	Carola Schröder	1,429	3.2	▲1.5	836	1.9	▲1.0
APT					829	1.9	▲0.3
Pirates					236	0.5	▼2.1
Verjüngungsforschung					179	0.4	
ÖDP					155	0.4	
The Blue Party	Frank Fechner	194	0.4		134	0.3	
Humanists					129	0.3	
NPD					69	0.2	▼2.5
DKP					40	0.1	
Awakening of German Patriots - Central Germany					37	0.1	
PDV					31	0.1	
BüSo					29	0.1	▼0.1
Informal votes		422			314		
Total valid votes		44,046			44,154		
Turnout		44,468	68.0	▲23.5			
Greens gain from CDU	Majority	1,107	2.5				

=== 2014 election ===
State election (2014): Leipzig 4
Notes:	Blue background denotes the winner of the electorate vote. Pink background denotes a candidate elected from their party list. Yellow background denotes an electorate win by a list member, or other incumbent. A ✓ or ✗ denotes status of any incumbent, win or lose respectively.						
Party	Candidate	Votes	%	±%	Party votes	%	±%
CDU	Sebastian Gemkow	6,716	24.9		7,055	26.1	
Left		6,403	23.8		5,965	22.1	
SPD		4,573	17.0		4,415	16.4	
Greens		4,379	16.2		4,300	15.9	
AfD		1,756	6.5		1,728	6.4	
PARTEI		684	2.5		508	1.9	
Pirates		658	2.4		689	2.6	
NPD		635	2.4		741	2.7	
FDP		628	2.3		803	3.0	
APT					420	1.6	
FW		447	1.7		251	0.9	
BüSo		69	0.3		52	0.2	
DSU					39	0.1	
Pro Germany Citizens' Movement					31	0.1	
Informal votes		287			238		
Total valid votes		26,948			26,997		
Turnout		27,235	44.5	▲3.3			
CDU win new seat	Majority	313	1.1				

== See also ==
- Politics of Saxony
- Landtag of Saxony
