= Leipzig 2 =

State electoral district of Germany

26: Leipzig 2
- Electoral district for the Landtag of Saxony
- Leipzig 2 in 2024
- District: Leipzig
- Electorate: 58,868 (2024)
- Major settlements: City-district Ost excluding the sub-districts of Neustadt-Neuschönefeld, Volksmarsdorf, and Anger-Crottendorf; and sub-districts of Libertwolkwitz, Holzhausen, and Stötteritz (Südost)

Current electoral district
- Party: CDU
- Member: Ronald Pohle

Leipzig 2 is an electoral constituency (German: Wahlkreis) represented in the Landtag of Saxony. It elects one member via first-past-the-post voting. Under the constituency numbering system, it is designated as constituency 26. It is within the city of Leipzig.

== Geography ==
The constituency comprises the district of Ost excluding the sub-districts of Neustadt-Neuschönefeld, Volksmarsdorf, and Anger-Crottendorf; and the sub-districts of Libertwolkwitz, Holzhausen, and Stötteritz of district Südost within the City of Leipzig.

There were 58,868 eligible voters in 2024.

== Members ==
Election	Member	Party	%
2014	Juliane Nagel	De Linke	28.3
2019	Juliane Nagel	De Linke	27.4
2024	Ronald Pohle	CDU	36.0

== Election results ==
=== 2024 election ===
State election (2024): Leipzig 2
Notes:	Blue background denotes the winner of the electorate vote. Pink background denotes a candidate elected from their party list. Yellow background denotes an electorate win by a list member, or other incumbent. A ✓ or ✗ denotes status of any incumbent, win or lose respectively.						
Party	Candidate	Votes	%	±%	Party votes	%	±%
CDU	Ronald Pohle	15,412	36.0	▲3.2	13,437	31.3	Steady
AfD	Marius Beyer	11,440	26.7	▲3.3	10,788	25.1	▲2.3
BSW	Maximilian Kretschmar	4,340	10.1		5,002	11.6	
SPD	Kevin Hofbüker	3,471	8.1	▼1.6	4,409	10.3	▲0.4
Left	Livia Stöckmann	3,024	7.1	▼4.7	2,755	6.4	▼4.7
Greens	Ulrike Böhm	2,769	6.5	▼6.3	2,781	6.5	▼4.7
FW	Bernd Schulze	1,603	3.7	▼1.1	1,173	2.7	▼0.1
APT					561	1.3	
Freie Sachsen					551	1.3	
PARTEI					457	1.1	▼0.9
FDP	Peter Jess	764	1.8	▼2.7	453	1.1	▼3.3
Pirates					142	0.3	
BD					118	0.3	
V-Partei3					93	0.2	
dieBasis					82	0.2	
Values					60	0.1	
Bündnis C					43	0.1	
ÖDP					38	0.1	
BüSo					30	0.1	
Informal votes		479			329		
Total valid votes		42,823			42,973		
Turnout		43,302	73.6	▲14.2			
CDU gain from Left	Majority	3,972	9.3				

=== 2019 election ===
State election (2019): Leipzig 2
Notes:	Blue background denotes the winner of the electorate vote. Pink background denotes a candidate elected from their party list. Yellow background denotes an electorate win by a list member, or other incumbent. A ✓ or ✗ denotes status of any incumbent, win or lose respectively.						
Party	Candidate	Votes	%	±%	Party votes	%	±%
Left	✓ Juliane Nagel	12,551	27.4	▼0.9	9,179	20.0	▼5.1
CDU	Karsten Albrecht	9,660	21.1	▼3.9	10,496	22.9	▼3.0
Greens	Paula Piechotta	8,655	18.9	▲5.8	9,884	21.5	▲6.4
AfD	Alexander Wiesner	6,049	13.2	▲8.2	5,962	13.0	▲7.8
SPD	Lars Menzel	4,395	9.6	▼9.0	4,842	10.5	▼6.3
PARTEI	Thomas Kumbernuß	1,904	4.2	▲2.0	1,548	3.4	▲1.1
FDP	Rudolf Ascherl	1,354	3.0	▲0.2	1,480	3.2	▲0.4
FW	Reinhard Bohse	1,224	2.7	▲1.5	830	1.8	▲0.9
APT					684	1.5	Steady
Humanists					181	0.4	
Verjüngungsforschung					178	0.4	
Pirates					175	0.4	▼1.5
ÖDP					146	0.3	
The Blue Party					98	0.2	
NPD					67	0.1	▼1.9
DKP					49	0.1	
PDV					40	0.1	
Awakening of German Patriots - Central Germany					37	0.1	
BüSo					22	0.0	▼0.2
Informal votes		412			306		
Total valid votes		45,792			45,898		
Turnout		46,204	72.2	▲21.9			
Left hold	Majority	2,891	6.3	▲3.0			

=== 2014 election ===
State election (2014): Leipzig 2
Notes:	Blue background denotes the winner of the electorate vote. Pink background denotes a candidate elected from their party list. Yellow background denotes an electorate win by a list member, or other incumbent. A ✓ or ✗ denotes status of any incumbent, win or lose respectively.						
Party	Candidate	Votes	%	±%	Party votes	%	±%
Left	Juliane Nagel	8,922	28.3		7,913	25.1	
CDU		7,868	25.0		8,163	25.9	
SPD		5,859	18.6		5,305	16.8	
Greens		4,135	13.1		4,746	15.1	
AfD		1,572	5.0		1,651	5.2	
FDP		877	2.8		895	2.8	
PARTEI		686	2.2		727	2.3	
Pirates		540	1.7		586	1.9	
NPD		537	1.7		642	2.0	
APT					483	1.5	
FW		380	1.2		296	0.9	
BüSo		103	0.3		56	0.2	
Pro Germany Citizens' Movement					35	0.1	
DSU					28	0.1	
Informal votes		328			281		
Total valid votes		31,479			31,526		
Turnout		31,807	50.3	▼4.2			
Left win new seat	Majority	1,054	3.3				

== See also ==
- Politics of Saxony
- Landtag of Saxony
