= Claudia Maicher =

German politician (born 1978)

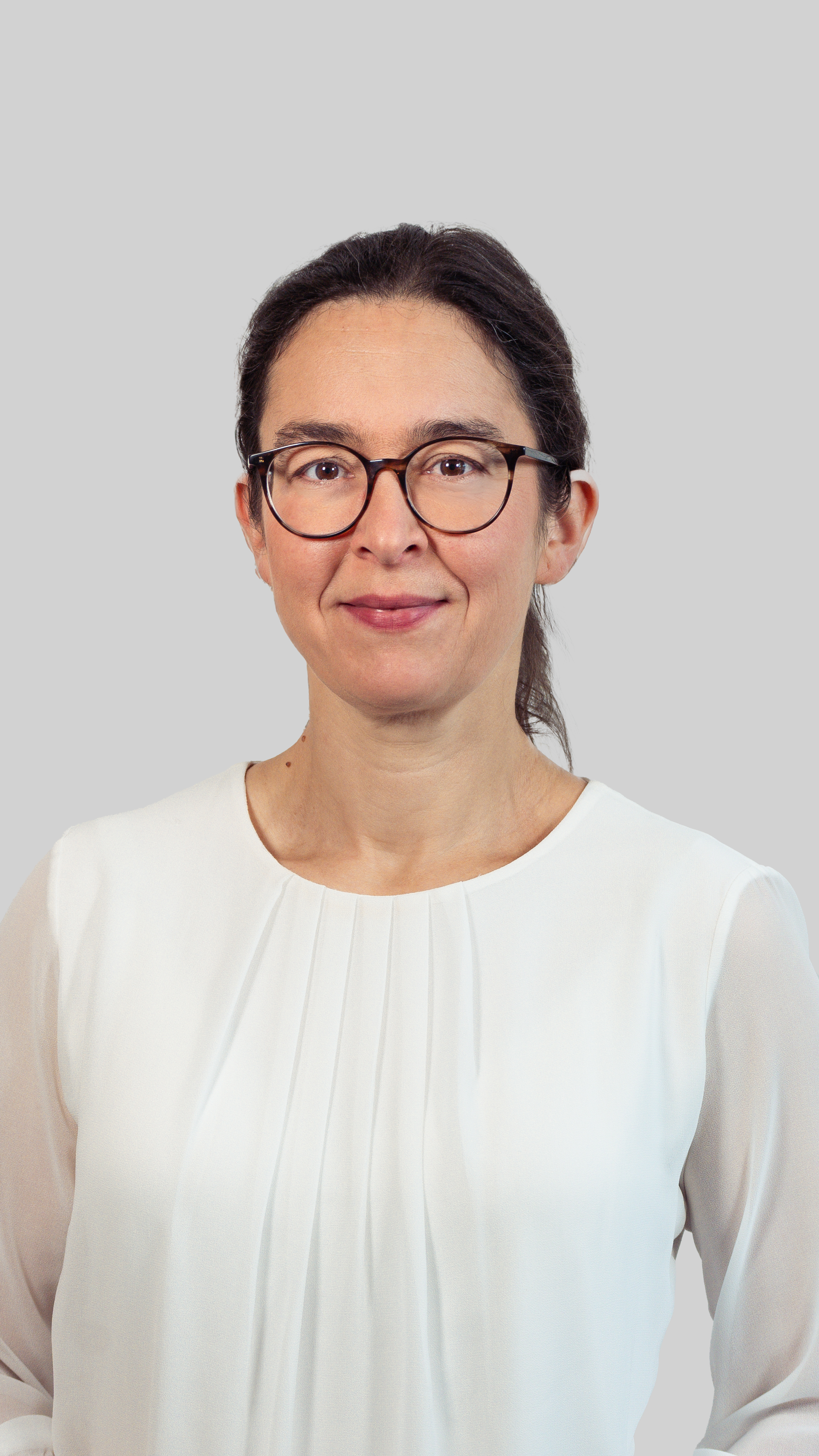
- Maicher in 2024

Member of the Landtag of Saxony
- Incumbent
- Assumed office 29 September 2014
- Preceded by: Sebastian Gemkow
- Constituency: Leipzig 4 (2019–2024); Leipzig 6 (2024–present)

Personal details
- Born: 22 June 1978 (age 47)
- Party: Alliance 90/The Greens (since 2005)

Claudia Maicher (born 22 June 1978) is a German politician serving as a member of the Landtag of Saxony since 2014. From 2010 to 2014, she served as spokesperson of Alliance 90/The Greens in Saxony.
