= Leipzig 6 =

State electoral district of Germany

30: Leipzig 6
- Electoral district for the Landtag of Saxony
- Leipzig 6 in 2024
- District: Leipzig
- Electorate: 54,817 (2024)
- Major settlements: City-district Alt-West excluding the sub-districts of Böhlitz-Ehrenberg and Burghausen-Rückmarsdorf, and sub-districts of Schleußig and Plagwitz (Südwest)

Current electoral district
- Party: Grüne
- Member: Claudia Maicher

Leipzig 6 is an electoral constituency (German: Wahlkreis) represented in the Landtag of Saxony. It elects one member via first-past-the-post voting. Under the constituency numbering system, it is designated as constituency 30. It is within the city of Leipzig.

== Geography ==
The constituency comprises the district of Alt-West excluding the sub-districts of Böhlitz-Ehrenberg and Burghausen-Rückmarsdorf, and the sub-districts of Schleußig and Plagwitz of district Südwest within the City of Leipzig.

There were 54,817 eligible voters in 2024.

== Members ==
Election	Member	Party	%
2014	Wolf-Dietrich Rost	CDU	30.2
2019	Wolf-Dietrich Rost	CDU	27.1
2024	Claudia Maicher	Grüne	29.2

== Election results ==
=== 2024 election ===
State election (2024): Leipzig 6
Notes:	Blue background denotes the winner of the electorate vote. Pink background denotes a candidate elected from their party list. Yellow background denotes an electorate win by a list member, or other incumbent. A ✓ or ✗ denotes status of any incumbent, win or lose respectively.						
Party	Candidate	Votes	%	±%	Party votes	%	±%
Greens	Claudia Maicher	12,455	29.2	▼0.8	8,313	19.5	▼8.0
Left	Marco Böhme	9,674	22.7	▼4.2	8,790	20.6	▲1.3
CDU	Marcus Mündlein	7,386	17.3	▲0.2	8,424	19.7	▲1.1
AfD	Kai Günther	5,521	13.0	▲0.9	5,275	12.4	▲0.6
SPD	Benjamin Schulz	3,124	7.3	▲0.4	5,403	12.7	▲3.2
BSW	Danilo Streller	2,796	6.6		3,590	8.4	
PARTEI					818	1.9	▼2.2
FW	Anke Görgner	1,134	2.7	▼0.2	452	1.1	▼0.6
APT					415	1.0	
FDP	Juliane Steinmüller	499	1.2	▼2.4	399	0.9	▼2.5
Freie Sachsen					236	0.6	
Pirates					169	0.4	
V-Partei3					102	0.2	
dieBasis					95	0.2	
BD					83	0.2	
Values					45	0.1	
ÖDP					32	0.1	
Bündnis C					25	0.1	
BüSo					19	0.0	
Informal votes		291			195		
Total valid votes		42,589			42,685		
Turnout		42,880	78.2	▲17.1			
Greens gain from CDU	Majority	2,781	6.5				

=== 2019 election ===
State election (2019): Leipzig 6
Notes:	Blue background denotes the winner of the electorate vote. Pink background denotes a candidate elected from their party list. Yellow background denotes an electorate win by a list member, or other incumbent. A ✓ or ✗ denotes status of any incumbent, win or lose respectively.						
Party	Candidate	Votes	%	±%	Party votes	%	±%
CDU	✓ Wolf-Dietrich Rost	11,504	27.1	▼3.1	11,854	27.8	▼4.5
AfD	Tobias Keller	8,354	19.7	▲11.4	8,093	19.0	▲10.5
Left	Marco Götze	7,080	16.7	▼4.8	5,056	11.9	▼7.5
Greens	Johannes Spenn	6,216	14.6	▲4.3	6,908	16.2	▲6.1
SPD	Holger Mann	5,028	11.8	▼7.9	4,351	10.2	▼6.6
FDP	Kirstin Franke	2,188	5.1	▲2.1	2,004	4.7	▲1.3
FW	Thomas Weidinger	1,947	4.6	▲3.1	1,220	2.9	▲1.8
PARTEI					1,153	2.7	▲2.0
APT					871	2.0	▲0.5
Verjüngungsforschung					231	0.5	
Pirates					188	0.4	▼1.2
NPD					134	0.3	▼3.6
Humanists					130	0.3	
ÖDP					126	0.3	
The Blue Party					124	0.3	
Awakening of German Patriots - Central Germany					59	0.1	
BüSo	Madeleine Fellauer	185	0.4	Steady	57	0.1	▼0.2
DKP					35	0.1	
PDV					28	0.1	
Informal votes		476			356		
Total valid votes		42,502			42,622		
Turnout		42,978	63.7	▲19.8			
CDU hold	Majority	3,150	7.4	▼1.3			

=== 2014 election ===
State election (2014): Leipzig 6
Notes:	Blue background denotes the winner of the electorate vote. Pink background denotes a candidate elected from their party list. Yellow background denotes an electorate win by a list member, or other incumbent. A ✓ or ✗ denotes status of any incumbent, win or lose respectively.						
Party	Candidate	Votes	%	±%	Party votes	%	±%
CDU	Wolf-Dietrich Rost	8,432	30.2		9,040	32.3	
Left		6,002	21.5		5,435	19.4	
SPD		5,504	19.7		4,702	16.8	
Greens		2,878	10.3		2,839	10.1	
AfD		2,310	8.3		2,390	8.5	
NPD		928	3.3		1,099	3.9	
FDP		836	3.0		953	3.4	
Pirates		500	1.8		459	1.6	
APT					428	1.5	
FW		428	1.5		298	1.1	
PARTEI					195	0.7	
BüSo		124	0.4		78	0.3	
Pro Germany Citizens' Movement					45	0.2	
DSU					34	0.1	
Informal votes		286			233		
Total valid votes		27,942			27,995		
Turnout		28,228	43.9	▼3.5			
CDU win new seat	Majority	2,430	8.7				

== See also ==
- Politics of Saxony
- Landtag of Saxony
