= Juliane Nagel =

German politician (born 1978)

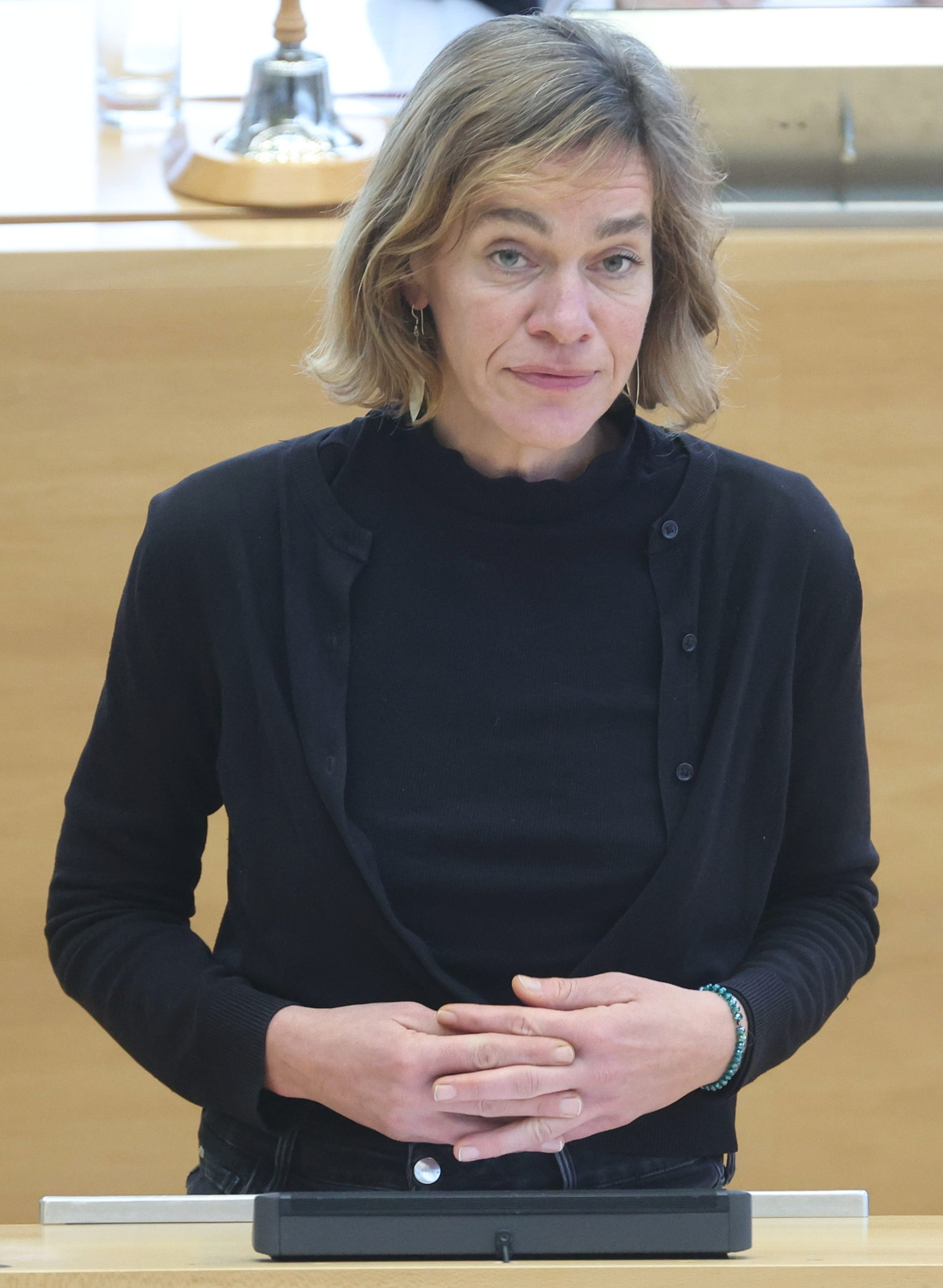
- Nagel in 2024

Member of the Landtag of Saxony
- Incumbent
- Assumed office 29 September 2014
- Preceded by: Sebastian Gemkow
- Constituency: Leipzig 2 (2014–2024); Leipzig 4 (2024–present)

Personal details
- Born: 19 September 1978 (age 47)
- Party: Die Linke

Juliane Rahel Nagel (born 19 September 1978) is a German politician serving as a member of the Landtag of Saxony since 2014. She has been a city councillor of Leipzig since 2009.
