= Gerald Eisenblätter =

German politician (born 1981)

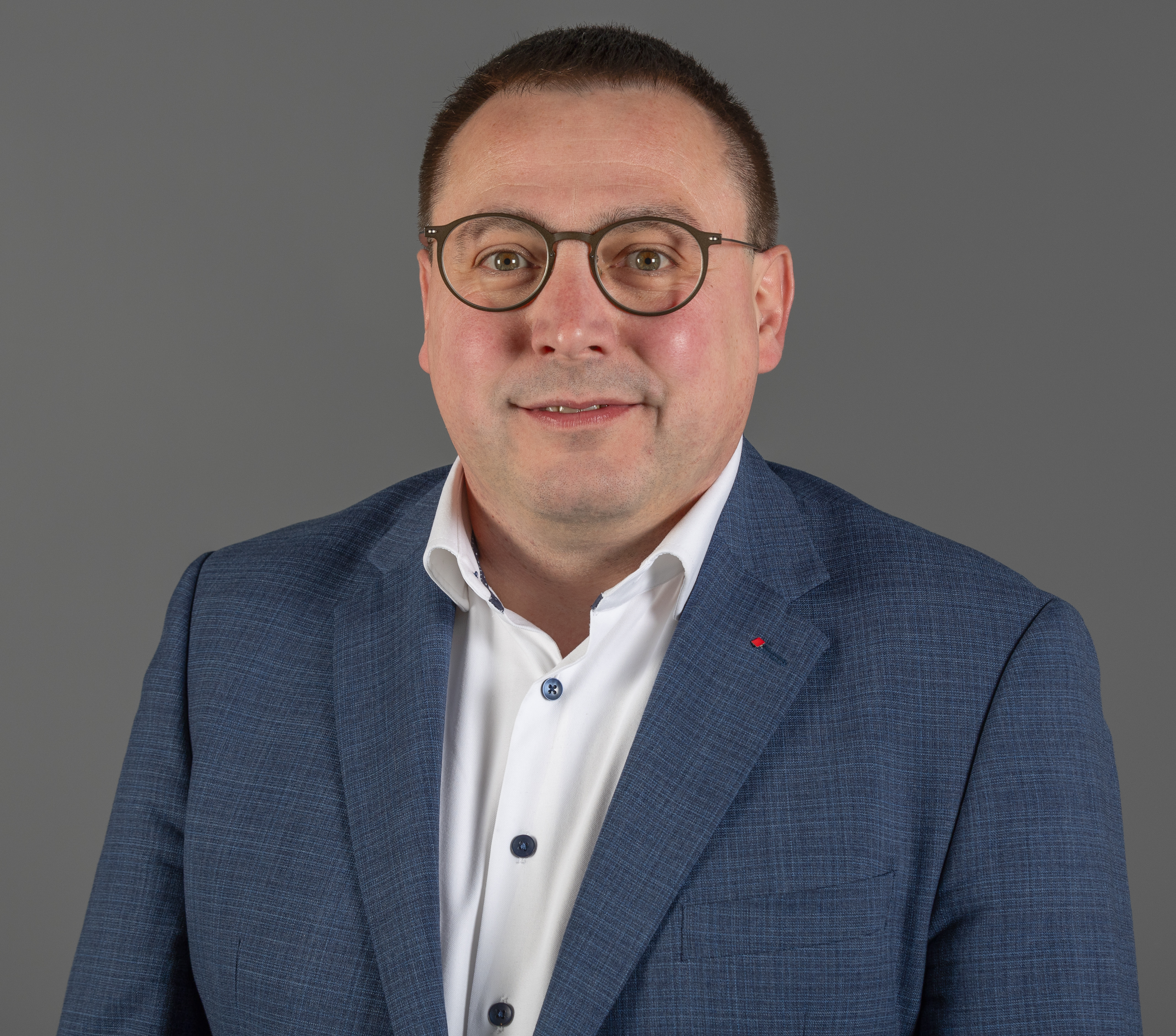
- Eisenblätter in 2025

Member of the Landtag of Saxony
- Incumbent
- Assumed office 1 October 2024

Personal details
- Born: 26 November 1981 (age 44)
- Party: Social Democratic Party (since 2009)

Gerald Eisenblätter (born 26 November 1981) is a German politician serving as a member of the Landtag of Saxony since 2024. He has served as chairman of the Arbeitsgemeinschaft für Bildung in der SPD in Saxony since 2019.
