= Alexander Wiesner =

German politician (born 1989)

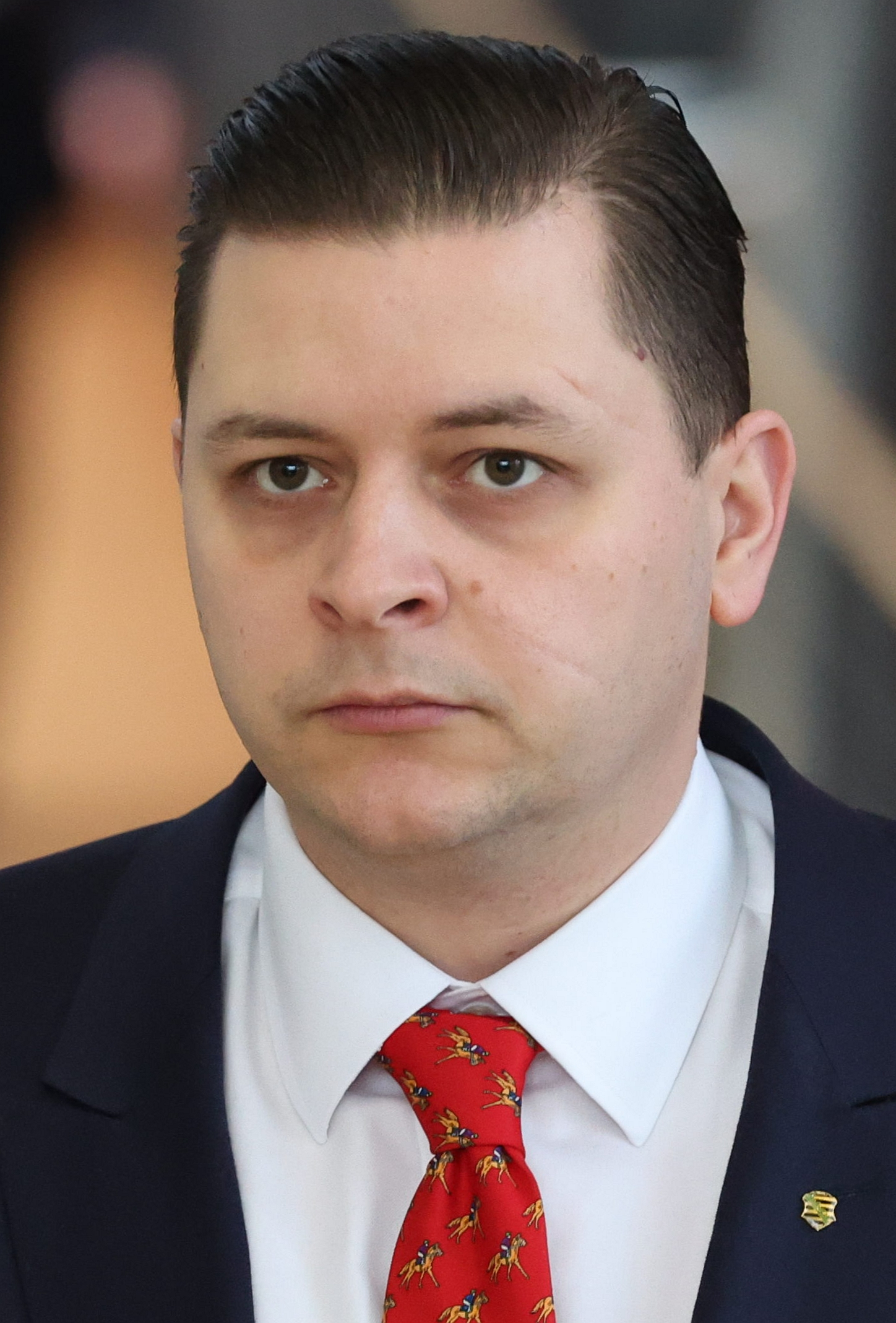
- Wiesner in 2024

Member of the Landtag of Saxony
- Incumbent
- Assumed office 1 October 2019

Personal details
- Born: 29 March 1989 (age 37)
- Party: Alternative for Germany (since 2017)

Alexander Wiesner (born 29 March 1989) is a German politician serving as a member of the Landtag of Saxony since 2019. From 2020 to 2024, he served as chairman of the Young Alternative for Germany in Saxony.
