= AfD Saxony =

AfD Saxony AfD Sachsen
- Leader: Jörg Urban
- Ideology: Right-wing populism
- Political position: Far-right
- National affiliation: Alternative for Germany
- Colors: Light blue
- Landtag of Saxony: 40 / 120

Website
- https://afdsachsen.de

The AfD Saxony is the state association of the Alternative for Germany (AfD) party in the German state of Saxony. The state association is led by a member of the Landtag of Saxony named Jörg Urban. The party holds the second most seats in the Landtag of Saxony and ideologically is positioned on the right-wing, specifically on the radical Right.

The State Office for the Protection of the Constitution in Saxony classifies the AfD Saxony as “confirmed right-wing extremist.”

== History ==
=== 2010s ===
The Founding of the AfD regional association in Saxony was decided on March 17, 2013, in Döbeln. The founding conference took place on April 28, 2013, as a general meeting. The 133 voting members present elected three board members, assessors and a Treasurer. Frauke Petry was elected as chairwoman of the party and the decision was made to take part in the 2013 German Federal election.

Initially, the AfD Saxony accepted former members of right-wing populist parties, such as the German Freedom Party, the Pro Chemnitz citizens Movement and the German Social Union. In the state elections in 2014, demands for a referendum on the creation of a Mosque with a minaret, for a German quota on radio and for the suspension of the Schengen Agreement were taken up. Members of the Saxon state association were involved in the founding of the Patriotic Platform a group of German Nationalists, which was externally represented by a former AfD state executive board member.

At the beginning of January 2016, it became known that an AfD member of the Landtag of Saxony Detlev Spangenberg had worked as an Unofficial collaborator for the Stasi during his military service with the National People's Army of East Germany and had provided the Stasi with several reports about other soldiers. The AfD Landtag parliamentary group confirmed Spangenberg's involvement with the Stasi and criticised the information's being made public. According to the Constitution of the Free State of Saxony, Stasi activity can lead to the loss of parliamentary mandate. In addition, AfD elected officials had to affirm that they had not collaborated with the Stasi.

Inter-party conflicts at state and Federal levels led to the resignation of the chairwoman Frauke Petry from the parliamentary group on September 26, 2017, and from the party on September 29, 2017. As a result, there were further resignations in the parliamentary group and state executive board. In October 2017, an emergency board had to be appointed by the party's arbitration court because a total of six board members resigned after Petry's resignation and board members were no longer able to act. The new Chairman of the AfD in Saxony, Jörg Urban announced increased cooperation with Pegida in order to strengthen the party and to become Minister president of Saxony after the state elections in 2019. However, at the end of June 2019, the party submitted a list of candidates that, even after several improvements, still contained numerous formal errors. The states election committee shortened the list of AfD candidates from 61 to 18. The state association filed a lawsuit against the decision with the Constitutional Court of Saxony, chairman Jörg Urban assumed an "arranged plot" against the AfD. The constitutional court decided on July 25, 2019, that the list of 30 candidates must be approved. On August 16, 2019, the constitutional court confirmed the decision on July 25, in which the AfD was only allowed to run 30 candidates. AFD's Saxony party leader Urban announced a complaint in the case to the election audit committee of the Saxon state parliament after the election.

=== 2020s ===
Largest vote share by state. During the 2025 German federal election.

Even before the 2021 German federal election, the state of Saxony had increasingly become known as an AfD stronghold. After the federal election in Germany, where the AfD made gains as the largest vote share in Saxony, which continued the trend of the AfD making gains in the former states of the eastern German Democratic Republic.

The state Office for the Protection of the Constitution classified the Saxon AfD as "confirmed right-wing extremist" in December 2023. On January 21 2025, the Saxon Higher Administrative Court (Oberverwaltungsgericht) in Bautzen rejected the AfD's appeal against a decision of the Administrative Court (Verwaltungsgericht) Dresden in expedited proceedings.

==== Today ====
The state association has been known to have close connections to the Reich citizens' movement, Compact magazine, and other political movements in Saxony such as the regionalist "Free Saxony" party. In 2023 members of the AfD state association repletely took part in political events led by the Free Saxons. In the same year the Saxon State Office for the Protection of the constitution would go on to label the AFD in Saxony as an anti-constitutional right-wing group.

== Election results ==
2019 Saxony state election results. AfD in blue.

2024 Saxony state election results. AfD in blue.

State Parliament (Landtag)

State election, year	No. of overall votes	% of overall vote & ranking	No. of overall seats won	+/–
Saxony, 2014	159,611	9.7 (#4)	14 / 126	
Saxony, 2019	595,671	27.5 (#2)	38 / 119	▲24
Saxony, 2024	719,274	30.6 (#2)	40 / 120	▲2

== See also ==
- AfD pro-Russian movement
- Ostalgie
- AfD Thuringia
- AfD Brandenburg
- AfD Saxony-Anhalt
- New states of Germany
