= Meißen 4 =

State electoral district of Germany

39: Meißen 4
- Electoral district for the Landtag of Saxony
- Meißen 4 in 2024
- District: Meissen
- Electorate: 50,344 (2024)
- Major settlements: Coswig and Radebeul

Current electoral district
- Party: CDU
- Member: Dr. Sven Eppinger

Meißen 4 is an electoral constituency (German: Wahlkreis) represented in the Landtag of Saxony. It elects one member via first-past-the-post voting. Under the constituency numbering system, it is designated as constituency 39. It is within the district of Meissen.

== Geography ==
The constituency comprises the towns of Coswig and Radebeul, and the municipality of Moritzburg within the district of Meissen.

There were 50,344 eligible voters in 2024.

== Members ==
Election	Member	Party	%
2014	Matthias Rößler	CDU	35.3
2019	Matthias Rößler	CDU	29.4
2024	Sven Eppinger	CDU	35.0

== Election results ==
=== 2024 election ===
State election (2024): Meißen 4
Notes:	Blue background denotes the winner of the electorate vote. Pink background denotes a candidate elected from their party list. Yellow background denotes an electorate win by a list member, or other incumbent. A ✓ or ✗ denotes status of any incumbent, win or lose respectively.						
Party	Candidate	Votes	%	±%	Party votes	%	±%
CDU	Sven Eppinger	13,777	35.0	▲5.5	13,761	34.8	▲3.1
AfD	René Hein	12,730	32.3	▲4.8	11,536	29.2	▲2.2
SPD	Martin Dulig	5,519	14.0	▼3.4	3,388	8.6	Steady
BSW	Gunda Thielking	3,103	7.9		4,386	11.1	
Greens	Katja Meier	1,601	4.1	▼5.2	2,191	5.5	▼4.5
FW	Torsten Andreas Franzke	1,037	2.6	▼2.7	613	1.6	▼1.7
Left	Anna Gorskih	1,027	2.6	▼4.0	941	2.4	▼5.4
FDP	Johannes Schmidt-Ramos	443	1.1	▼2.8	450	1.1	▼4.9
Freie Sachsen	V. Bistrosch-Büschel	180	0.5		890	2.3	
APT					402	1.0	
PARTEI					283	0.7	▼0.6
BD					153	0.4	
Pirates					123	0.3	
dieBasis					103	0.3	
Values					94	0.2	
V-Partei3					57	0.1	
BD					50	0.1	
ÖDP					50	0.1	
BüSo					32	0.1	
Informal votes		408			322		
Total valid votes		39,417			39,503		
Turnout		39,825	79.1	▲7.0			
CDU hold	Majority	1,047	2.7				

=== 2019 election ===
State election (2019): Meißen 4
Notes:	Blue background denotes the winner of the electorate vote. Pink background denotes a candidate elected from their party list. Yellow background denotes an electorate win by a list member, or other incumbent. A ✓ or ✗ denotes status of any incumbent, win or lose respectively.						
Party	Candidate	Votes	%	±%	Party votes	%	±%
CDU	✓ Matthias Rößler	10,843	29.4	▼5.8	11,723	31.8	▼6.9
AfD	René Hein	10,131	27.5	▲17.3	9,979	27.0	▲16.3
SPD	Martin Dulig	6,420	17.4	▼3.6	3,175	8.6	▼5.2
Greens	Tobias Plessing	3,402	9.2	▲2.8	3,714	10.1	▲2.8
Left	Daniel Falco Borowitzki	2,444	6.6	▼6.1	2,864	7.8	▼6.9
FW	Bernhard Kroemer	1,974	5.4	▼0.4	1,202	3.3	▲0.3
FDP	Alexander Wolf	1,441	3.9	▲0.5	2,225	6.0	▲1.6
APT					516	1.4	▲0.3
PARTEI					472	1.3	▲0.7
Verjüngungsforschung					193	0.5	
The Blue Party					159	0.4	
NPD					154	0.4	▼3.5
ÖDP					142	0.4	
Awakening of German Patriots - Central Germany					110	0.3	
Pirates					96	0.3	▼0.7
Humanists					57	0.2	
BüSo	Thomas Born	187	0.5	▲0.1	42	0.1	▼0.2
PDV					36	0.1	
DKP					32	0.1	
Informal votes		388			339		
Total valid votes		36,842			36,891		
Turnout		37,230	72.7	▲16.2			
CDU hold	Majority	712	1.9	▼12.3			

=== 2014 election ===
State election (2014): Meißen 4
Notes:	Blue background denotes the winner of the electorate vote. Pink background denotes a candidate elected from their party list. Yellow background denotes an electorate win by a list member, or other incumbent. A ✓ or ✗ denotes status of any incumbent, win or lose respectively.						
Party	Candidate	Votes	%	±%	Party votes	%	±%
CDU	Matthias Rößler	10,109	35.2		11,117	38.7	
SPD		6,013	21.0		3,958	13.8	
Left		3,632	12.7		4,207	14.7	
AfD		2,913	10.2		3,070	10.7	
Greens		1,846	6.4		2,093	7.3	
FW		1,671	5.8		868	3.0	
FDP		982	3.4		1,275	4.4	
NPD		957	3.3		1,130	3.9	
APT					304	1.1	
Pirates		325	1.1		297	1.0	
PARTEI					168	0.6	
BüSo		124	0.4		93	0.3	
DSU		108	0.4		79	0.3	
Pro Germany Citizens' Movement					57	0.2	
Informal votes		361			325		
Total valid votes		28,680			28,716		
Turnout		29,041	56.5	▼0.8			
CDU win new seat	Majority	4,096	14.2				

== See also ==
- Politics of Saxony
- Landtag of Saxony
