= Dresden 7 =

State electoral district of Germany

46: Dresden 7
- Electoral district for the Landtag of Saxony
- Dresden 7 in 2024
- District: Dresden
- Electorate: 48,128 (2024)
- Major settlements: City-district Cotta excluding Löbtau-Nord and Löbtau-Süd; Altfranken; Cossebaude; Oberwartha; Mobschatz; and Gompitz

Current electoral district
- Party: CDU
- Member: Felix Hitzig

Dresden 7 is an electoral constituency (German: Wahlkreis) represented in the Landtag of Saxony. It elects one member via first-past-the-post voting. Under the constituency numbering system, it is designated as constituency 46. It is within the city of Dresden.

== Geography ==
The constituency comprises the city-district Cotta excluding Löbtau-Nord and Löbtau-Süd; and the villages of Altfranken, Cossebaude, Oberwartha, Mobschatz, and Gompitz within the city of Dresden.

There were 48,128 eligible voters in 2024.

== Members ==
Election	Member	Party	%
2014	Markus Ulbig	CDU	33.4
2019	Barbara Klepsch	CDU	25.3
2024	Felix Hitzig	CDU	37.3

== Election results ==
=== 2024 election ===
State election (2024): Dresden 7
Notes:	Blue background denotes the winner of the electorate vote. Pink background denotes a candidate elected from their party list. Yellow background denotes an electorate win by a list member, or other incumbent. A ✓ or ✗ denotes status of any incumbent, win or lose respectively.						
Party	Candidate	Votes	%	±%	Party votes	%	±%
CDU	Felix Hitzig	13,148	37.3	▲4.8	11,297	31.9	▲3.8
AfD	Matthias Rentzsch	11,856	33.7	▲3.1	10,577	29.9	▲1.4
BSW					3,997	11.3	
SPD	Lukas Peger	2,179	6.2	▼1.7	2,862	8.1	▲0.7
Independent	Holger Zastrow	2,159	6.1				
Greens	Yvonne Mosler	1,849	5.3	▼5.3	2,251	6.4	▼4.3
Left	Philipp Grimm	1,732	4.9	▼6.4	1,201	3.4	▼6.0
FW	Torsten Nitzsche	1,286	3.7		604	1.7	▼2.1
FDP	Dominik Zoch	466	1.3	▼49	389	1.1	▼4.9
Freie Sachsen	H. Schneese	336	1.0		844	2.4	
APT					373	1.1	
PARTEI					369	1.0	▼0.7
Pirates					213	0.6	
BD					100	0.3	
dieBasis					70	0.2	
Values					70	0.2	
V-Partei3					60	0.2	
BüSo	Roland Hultsch	208	0.6		56	0.2	
ÖDP					45	0.1	
Bündnis C					27	0.1	
Informal votes		400			214		
Total valid votes		35,219			35,405		
Turnout		35,619	74.0	▲5.3			
CDU hold	Majority	1,292	3.6				

=== 2019 election ===
State election (2019): Dresden 7
Notes:	Blue background denotes the winner of the electorate vote. Pink background denotes a candidate elected from their party list. Yellow background denotes an electorate win by a list member, or other incumbent. A ✓ or ✗ denotes status of any incumbent, win or lose respectively.						
Party	Candidate	Votes	%	±%	Party votes	%	±%
CDU	Barbara Klepsch	10,719	25.3	▼8.1	9,942	23.4	▼8.4
AfD	Hans-Jürgen Zickler	9,176	21.7		8,644	20.3	▲11.6
Greens	Susanne Krause	8,153	19.3	▲6.7	7,418	17.5	▲7.0
Left	Uta Gensichen	6,167	14.6	▼10.0	5,585	13.1	▼7.1
SPD	Vincent Drews	3,304	7.8	▼4.9	3,571	8.4	▼4.8
FDP	Stefan Schubert	2,400	5.7	▲2.5	2,421	5.7	▲2.3
PARTEI	Robert Küttner	2,119	5.0		1,371	3.2	▲1.2
FW					1,366	3.2	▲1.5
APT					692	1.6	▼0.1
Pirates					321	0.8	▼1.7
Verjüngungsforschung					238	0.6	
ÖDP					217	0.5	
Humanists					190	0.4	
NPD					140	0.3	▼3.4
The Blue Party					133	0.3	
BüSo	Boris Heider	296	0.7	▼0.2	91	0.2	▼0.1
Awakening of German Patriots - Central Germany					66	0.2	
PDV					63	0.1	
DKP					33	0.1	
Informal votes		430			262		
Total valid votes		42,334			42,502		
Turnout		42,764	67.3	▲16.3			
CDU hold	Majority	1,543	3.6	▼5.2			

=== 2014 election ===
State election (2014): Dresden 7
Notes:	Blue background denotes the winner of the electorate vote. Pink background denotes a candidate elected from their party list. Yellow background denotes an electorate win by a list member, or other incumbent. A ✓ or ✗ denotes status of any incumbent, win or lose respectively.						
Party	Candidate	Votes	%	±%	Party votes	%	±%
CDU	Markus Ulbig	10,458	33.4		10,027	31.8	
Left		7,704	24.6		6,377	20.2	
SPD		3,989	12.7		4,176	13.2	
Greens		3,956	12.6		3,306	10.5	
AfD					2,749	8.7	
NPD		1,557	5.0		1,157	3.7	
Pirates		1,250	4.0		784	2.5	
FW		1,148	3.7		528	1.7	
FDP		1,004	3.2		1,072	3.4	
PARTEI					639	2.0	
APT					540	1.7	
BüSo		268	0.9		104	0.3	
DSU					51	0.2	
Pro Germany Citizens' Movement					50	0.2	
Informal votes		565			339		
Total valid votes		31,334			31,560		
Turnout		31,899	51.0	▲0.5			
CDU win new seat	Majority	2,754	8.8				

== See also ==
- Politics of Saxony
- Landtag of Saxony
