= Marcus Pretzell =

German politician and lawyer (born 1973)

Marcus Pretzell MEP
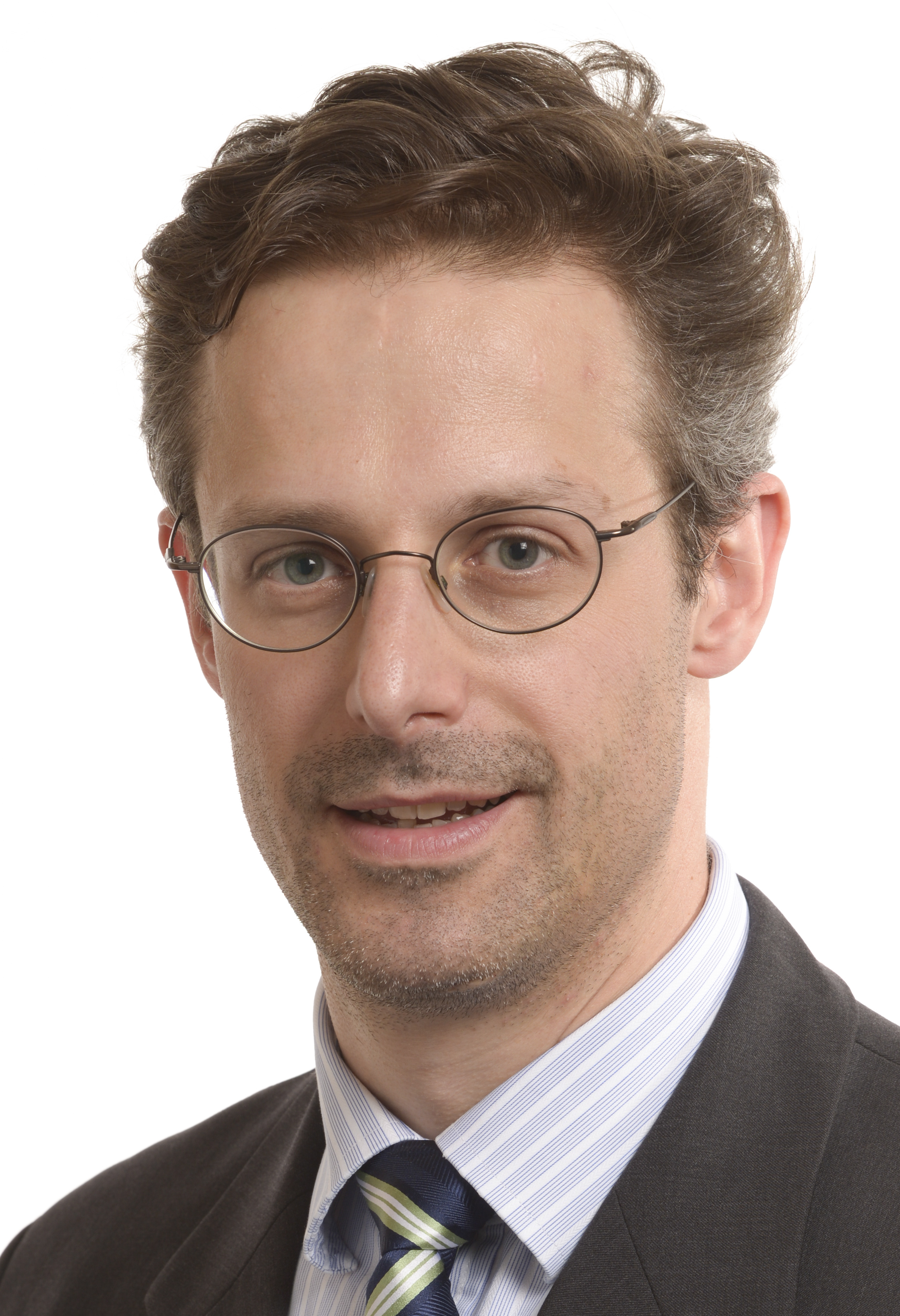

Member of the European Parliament
- In office 1 May 2015 – 1 July 2019
- Constituency: Germany

Personal details
- Born: 16 July 1973 (age 53) Rinteln, West Germany (now Germany)
- Party: AfD (2013–2017); Blue Party (2017–2019)
- Spouse: Frauke Petry (m. 2016)
- Children: 6
- Education: University of Heidelberg

Marcus Horst Hubertus Pretzell (born 16 July 1973) is a German politician and was Member of the European Parliament (MEP) from Germany from 2016 to 2019. He was a member of the Alternative for Germany, part of the Europe of Nations and Freedom and was a member of The Blue Party.

In April 2016, Pretzell attracted controversy and criticism after stating that he supported "the defence of the German border with armed force" against asylum seekers. As a result, on 12 April 2016, he was expelled from the European Conservatives and Reformists group. Following this, he joined Marine Le Pen's Europe of Nations and Freedom faction.

During a speech at an AfD party convention in Essen, 4–5 July 2015, he said, "We had the discussion about whether we were the Euro party or the Pegida party. We are both."

Pretzell is involved in the AfD donation scandal. Beside of him the AfD Federal – and European – politicians Alice Weidel, Jörg Meuthen and Guido Reil profited from unnamed donors. Public prosecutor's office Konstanz and the office of Bundestag determine since 2018. The acceptance of donations from non-EU countries is prohibited for German parties; with the exception of donations from German or European companies.

Pretzell was listed as a recipient of thousands of euros as compensation for his presence at the 2016 Yalta Economic Forum in Russia's occupied Crimea in OCCRP investigation of Russia's International Agency for Current Policy.
