= Constanze Geiert =

German politician (born 1976)

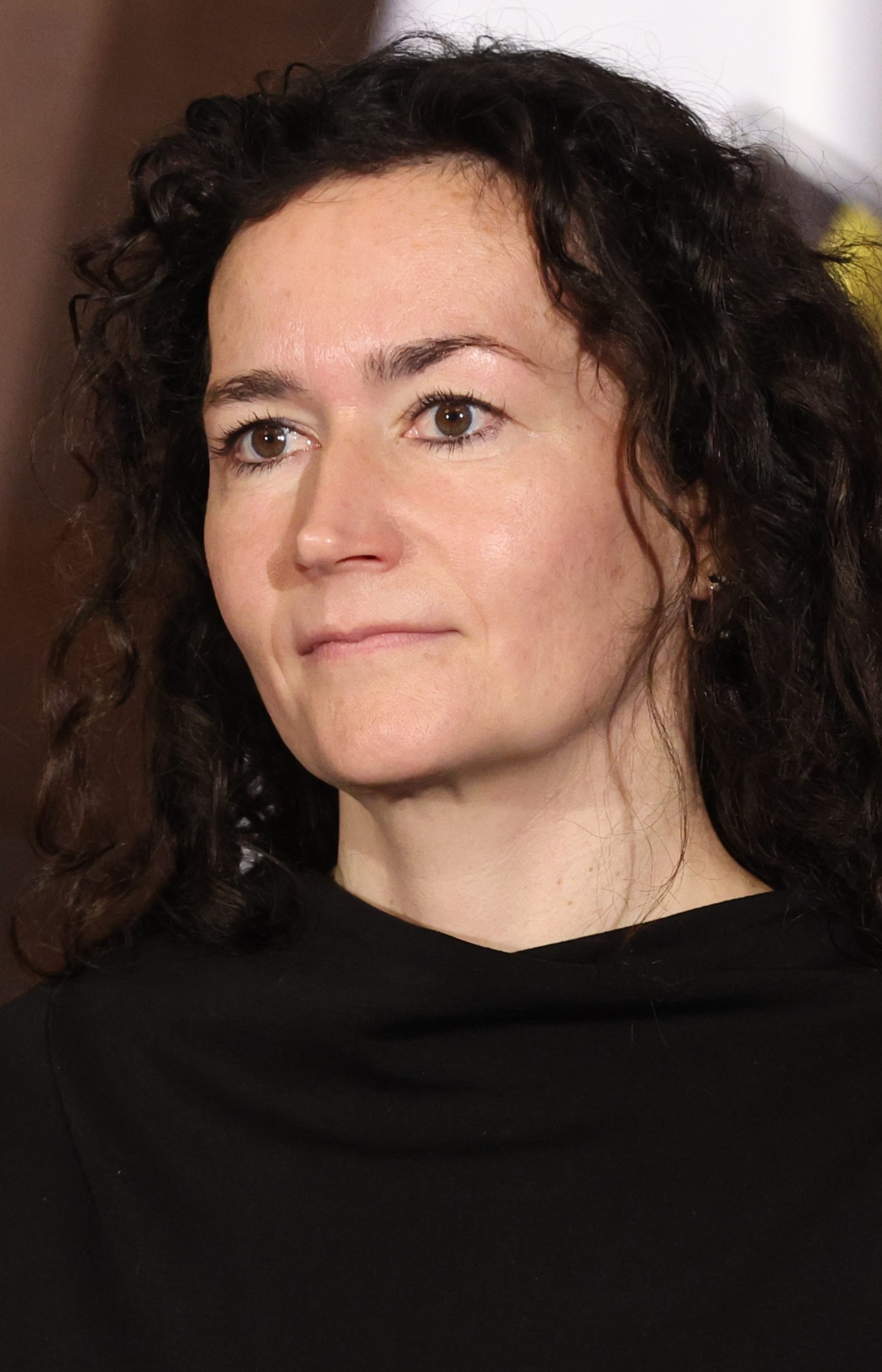
- Geiert in 2024

Minister of Justice of Saxony
- Incumbent
- Assumed office 19 December 2024
- Minister-President: Michael Kretschmer
- Preceded by: Katja Meier

Personal details
- Born: 24 June 1976 (age 49) Dresden
- Party: Christian Democratic Union (since 2000)

Constanze Geiert (born 24 June 1976 in Dresden) is a German politician serving as minister of justice of Saxony since 2024. She has been a professor of special administrative law at the HSF Meißen since 2019.
