= Frauke Petry =

German businesswoman and politician (born 1975)

Frauke Petry MdB a.D.
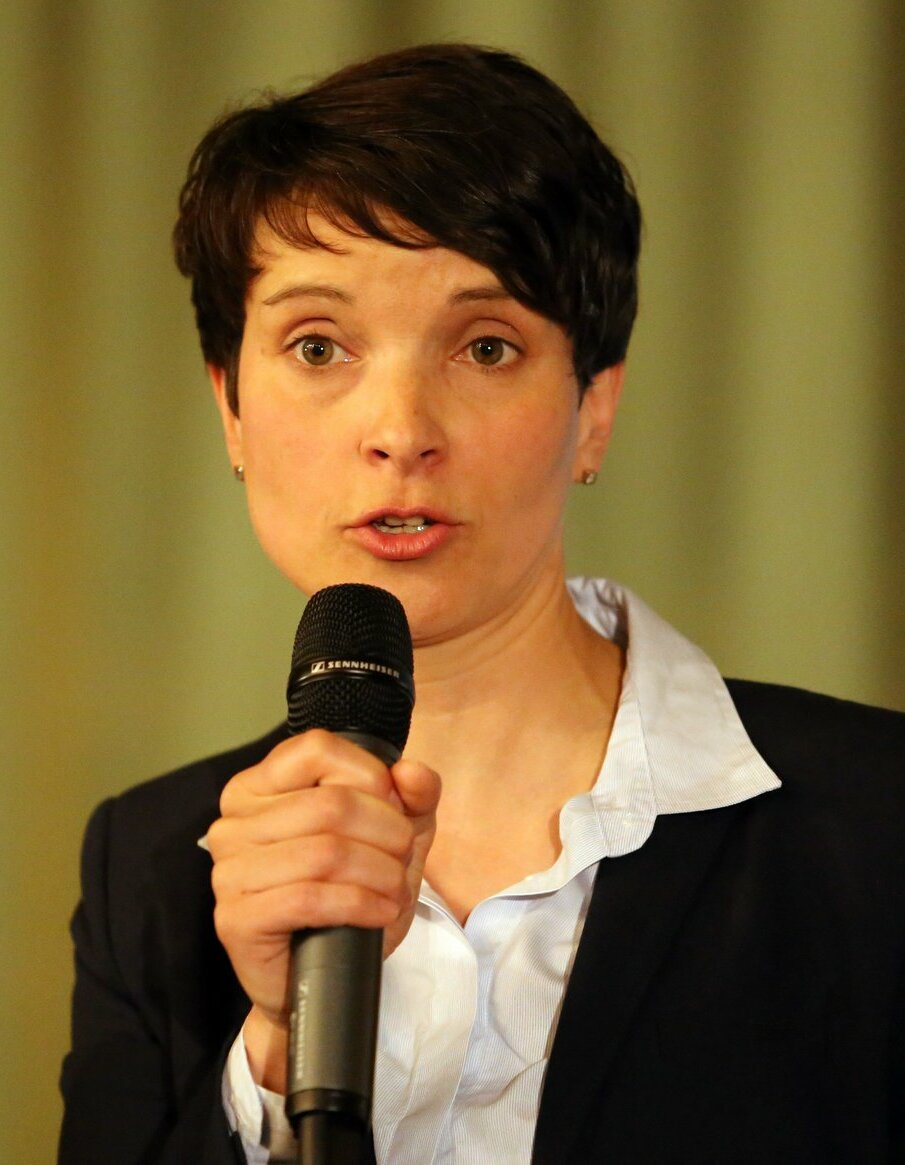
- Petry in 2016

Leader of Die Blaue Partei
- In office 14 October 2017 – 31 December 2019
- Deputy: Michael Muster; Alexander Langguth; Hubertus von Below
- Preceded by: Michael Muster
- Succeeded by: Position abolished

Leader of the Alternative for Germany
- In office 4 July 2015 – 29 September 2017 Serving with Jörg Meuthen
- Preceded by: Bernd Lucke
- Succeeded by: Jörg Meuthen

Member of the Bundestag for Sächsische Schweiz-Osterzgebirge
- In office 24 October 2017 – 26 October 2021
- Preceded by: Klaus Brähmig
- Succeeded by: Steffen Janich
Saxony state politics (2013–2019)
Leader of the Alternative for Germany in Saxony
In office 28 April 2013 – 26 September 2017
Preceded by	Position established
Succeeded by	Jörg Urban
Leader of the Alternative for Germany in the Landtag of Saxony
In office 3 September 2014 – 30 September 2017
Deputy	Jörg Urban
Preceded by	Position established
Succeeded by	Jörg Urban
Member of the Landtag of Saxony
In office 29 September 2014 – 1 October 2019
Constituency	AfD List

Personal details
- Born: Frauke Marquardt; 1 June 1975 (age 51) Dresden, East Germany
- Party: Independent (2019–present); Blue Party (2017–2019); AfD (2013–2017)
- Other political affiliations: European Conservatives and Reformists
- Spouses: Sven Petry (m. 1998; div. 2016); Marcus Pretzell (m. 2016)
- Children: 6
- Education: University of Reading; University of Göttingen
- Occupation: Politician

Frauke Petry (German: [ˈfʁaʊkə ˈpeːtʁiː]; née Marquardt; born 1 June 1975) is a German far-right politician who chaired the Alternative for Germany (AfD) party from July 2015 to September 2017. A chemist by training and with a professional background as a businesswoman, some political scientists described Petry as a representative of the national conservative wing of that party.

Petry had formerly served as one of three party spokespersons from 2013 to 2015, and became leader in 2015, displacing the party's founder Bernd Lucke after an internal power struggle; Lucke subsequently left the party and said it has "fallen irretrievably into the wrong hands" after Petry's election. Petry left the party in turn after stating it had become "anarchical" and unable to provide a "credible platform".

Petry is noted for her anti-immigration and anti-Islamic views, for her calls to ban minarets, and for arguing that German police forces should "use firearms if necessary" to prevent illegal border-crossings in Europe. She led the Blue Party until its dissolution in late 2019.

== Early life ==
Petry was born on 1 June 1975 to a chemist and an engineer in Dresden in what was then East Germany. She lived in Schwarzheide, Brandenburg, near Saxony until the fall of the Berlin Wall in 1989, after which her family moved to Bergkamen, in Westphalia. Petry took her first degree in chemistry at the University of Reading, England, in 1998, before attending the University of Göttingen, from where she gained a doctorate in 2004. She was supported by a scholarship of the Studienstiftung.

== Political orientation ==
Petry was described as a representative of the national-conservative wing of her party. To the contrary, political scientist Cas Mudde described her as a representative of the far-right wing of her party. Petry describes herself as national-conservative and supporting policies of "national self-determinism". Der Spiegel reports that her electoral success on 4 July 2015, which gave her the reins of leadership in the AfD in preference to Bernd Lucke, one of the party's founders, was made possible by the national-conservative wing of the party. Lucke's wing did not have the majority.

On the subject of the political spectrum, Petry has said, "Right and left are terms that haven't fitted for a long time". Petry believes sharia is incompatible with the "democratic and liberal order of state" and has said that the majority within her AfD favors a liberal-conservative policy.

=== Border control ===
In January 2016, when a reporter from the regional newspaper Mannheimer Morgen asked her about European and German border policies, Petry answered that the German Border Police (Bundesgrenzschutz) must do their jobs by "hindering illegal entry of refugees". The reporter followed up on her response, using the term Schießbefehl which means "order to shoot". Petry stated that she did not use that term, going on to state that no policeman "wants to fire on a refugee and I don't want that either" but that the BGS must follow the law to maintain the integrity of European borders. Afterwards, Petry made several attempts to justify these statements.

=== Male circumcision ===
In a rough draft of its manifesto, the AfD had considered adopting a stance stating that male circumcision should be outlawed, but Petry said in her interview with Tim Sebastian on 21 March 2016 that this language would not be in the final draft. The Central Council of Jews in Germany is also in an uproar over the question of religious circumcision, stating that to give precedence to a child's self-determination over his parents' right of freedom of religion is "an unprecedented and dramatic intrusion on the right to self-determination of religious communities". This national dialogue is happening in the wake of a 2012 decision of a Higher Regional Court in Cologne, which called the circumcision of a 4-year-old boy "bodily harm".

=== Women in society ===
Petry does not believe mandatory quotas are the right way to give opportunities to women, nor does she believe they improve the chances of women having more leadership positions. She believes quotas make women unsure of whether a promotion would be made on the basis of qualifications.

Regarding the issue of burqas, Petry believes it should not be compulsory for women to dress in such a manner. She has said that in schools "this sort of religious costume should not be worn".

=== Migration ===
On the issue of international migration, Petry is of the view that, "We [Germany and the rest of Europe] have to decide what sort of migration we want to accept". She has said, "Deciding about who's migrating and who's not, who's going to be part of a new country is, in the end, a question of borders, whether you see them, or whether you don't. When I go to France, I don't see the border, but I know it's there and I accept it, be it in terms of speed limits, or be it in terms of laws and legislation".

== Carrier ==
=== Resignation from AfD ===
In April 2017, Petry stepped down as AfD's candidate for chancellor due to reports that she wanted to change the party's policies to appeal to more moderate voters like the Sweden Democrats. This came after she had frequently criticised Björn Höcke, one of the founders of AfD, due to a speech that he held in Dresden in which, referring to the Memorial to the Murdered Jews of Europe, he stated that "we Germans are the only people in the world who have planted a memorial of shame in the heart of their capital", and suggested that Germans "need to make a 180 degree change in their politics of commemoration". The speech was widely criticized as antisemitic, among others by Jewish leaders in Germany. Petry backed attempts to expel Höcke from AfD as the party chairwoman, describing him as a "burden to the party", but could not prevail in a power struggle with her party rivals Jörg Meuthen and Alexander Gauland, who accused her of splitting party ranks. Her leadership style was seen by observers as having been high-handed and thus having alienated a number of party members. Despite the internal strife, her party voted to allow her to run for a seat in the German parliament in the September 2017 elections.

One day after election night in which Petry was elected to the Bundestag by direct mandate, she left an AfD press conference saying that she won't join the party's parliamentary group in the Bundestag because the party became too "anarchical" and "could not offer a credible platform". Alice Weidel, the AfD's frontrunner, demanded her resignation from the party. Following this, Petry said that she would join the Bundestag as an independent politician. She resigned from the party and all offices on 29 September 2017. She was subsequently charged with perjury for allegedly lying under oath about her former party's finances. She was convicted and sentenced to a fine of 6,000 euros. In 2020, the Federal Court of Justice overturned the conviction on the grounds that the law on perjury did not apply to the context in which she made the false statements.

=== Post-AfD activities ===
Independent member of the Bundestag (2017–2021). During the 19th legislative term, Petry served in the German Bundestag as a directly elected, yet independent, member for the Sächsische Schweiz-Osterzgebirge constituency. She left parliament following the conclusion of the legislative term in October 2021.

On 12 October 2017, immediately after leaving the AfD Petry announced that she would form a new party, called the Blue Party, which would provide a "reasonable conservative" agenda and seek to replicate the success of the Christian Social Union in Bavaria. She assumed its leadership. Following a lack of electoral success, the party was dissolved at the end of 2019.

Petry made a reappearance in public during an April 2021 interview with Kurt Krömer in which she spoke about the Alternative for Germany donation scandal. She revealed that she would be writing a book about her time as AfD leader. The book was subsequently published as Requiem for the AfD in which Petry argued the party had become a "chaotic protest party" no longer interested in governing after she resigned as leader and accused politicians within the party of being blackmailed into accepting undeclared donations.

In May 2025, outlets including tagesschau reported that Petry, together with associates, had launched an organization called "Team Freiheit" ("Team Freedom"). This serves as an organizational preparatory step for the founding of a new political party again.

With this project, Petry is pursuing an anti-statist and libertarian agenda. Her stated goals include reducing the share of government spending in the economy from just under 50 percent to 25 percent within five years, renewing the nation’s cultural alignment with the West, and enabling the nomination of independent citizens and entrepreneurs for elections without requiring them to hold formal party membership. When announcing the initiative in May 2025, Petry stated that she intended for the new party to contest elections, starting with the 2026 state parliamentary elections in Baden-Württemberg, but this did not come to pass.

== Personal life ==
In 2007, Petry founded her own business, PURinvent, a Leipzig-based manufacturer of polyurethane tire fill products. She received the Medal of the Order of Merit in 2012.

Petry separated from her husband, Sven Petry, a Lutheran pastor, in October 2015, stating that this was by mutual consent and that the two remained friends and would continue to share in the upbringing of their four children. Frauke Petry also revealed that "much more than just friendly feelings" had developed between her and Marcus Pretzell, a fellow AfD party member. At about the same time, it was announced that Sven Petry had joined the CDU. In December 2016, Petry married Pretzell, by then her domestic partner. Having had two further children with Pretzell, Petry now has six altogether and lives in Tautenhain, Saxony.

Petry is a member of the Evangelical-Lutheran Church of Saxony, a member church of the Evangelical Church in Germany (EKD). She criticizes many stances of the EKD, which historically holds a largely liberal Protestant stance, claiming it follows "only its own interests" regarding immigration. In 2016 she advocated its cooperation with AfD in order to defend the "European Christian values of the West".
