= Rico Gebhardt =

German politician

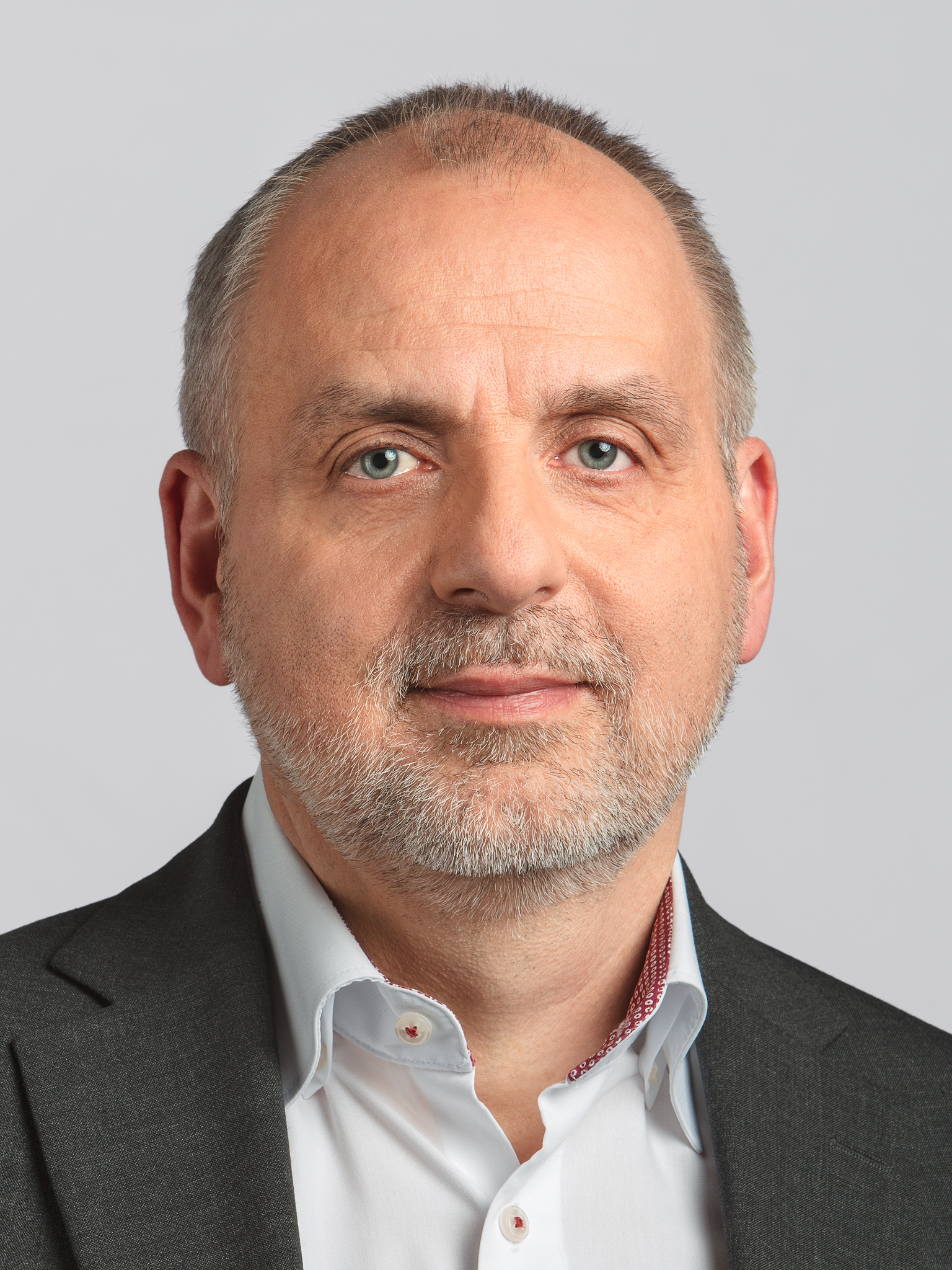

Leader of The Left in Saxony
- Incumbent
- Assumed office 5 November 2011
- Preceded by: André Hahn

Leader of The Left in the Landtag of Saxony
- Incumbent
- Assumed office 1 August 2012
- Preceded by: André Hahn

Leader of the Opposition in the Landtag of Saxony
- In office 1 August 2012 – 20 December 2019
- Preceded by: André Hahn
- Succeeded by: Jörg Urban

Member of the Landtag of Saxony
- Incumbent
- Assumed office October 2004

Member of the Aue City Council
- In office June 1994 – April 2003

Personal details
- Born: May 27, 1963 (age 62) Bad Schlema, East Germany
- Political party: The Left
- Children: 4

Military service
- Allegiance: National People's Army

Rico Gebhardt (born 27 May 1963) is a German politician for The Left and member of the Landtag of the Free State of Saxony since 2004. Within the Landtag he has been chairman of the parliamentary group of The Left since his election, and was from 2012 and 2019 Leader of the Opposition.

== Life ==
Gebhardt was born in 1963 in Bad Schlema. He graduated from the Polytechnische Oberschule after completing the 10th grade and did an apprenticeship as a cook. He completed three years of military service in the National People's Army. From 1984 to 1987 he was a full-time functionary for the Free German Youth. He subsequently worked as a sales manager, division manager in retail and managing director for a fish wholesaler. In the 1990s he was a personal assistant to a member of the Bundestag. In 2000 he became the full-time party president for The Left in Saxony.

He lives in Dresden, is married and has four children.

== Political career ==
Gebhardt joined the Socialist Unity Party (SED) in 1981. After reunification, he was a local councillor in the Aue-Schwarzenberg district for the Party of Democratic Socialism (PDS) from March 1990 to April 2003 and a city councillor in Aue from June 1994 to April 2003. In the local elections in 1994 and 1999 he ran unsuccessfully for the office of mayor of Aue.

From 1999 to 2009 Gebhardt was state president in Saxony of the PDS and, after 2007, of its successor party The Left. Since October 2004 he has been a member of the Saxon Landstag. There he is a member of the Committee on Rules of Procedure and Immunity Matters as well as the Constitutional, Legal and European Committees and a deputy member of the executive committee. He is the domestic policy spokesman in his parliamentary group. In September 2009 he ran for the office of parliamentary group chairman, but lost to André Hahn.

On 7 November 2009 he was elected to the position of party leader of The Left with 156 of 202 votes and confirmed in this office on 5 November 2011. On 17 July 2012, he was elected to succeed André Hahn as parliamentary group chairman for The Left in the Saxon Landtag. He assumed this position on 1 August 2012. On 16 November 2013, a state party conference in Leipzig nominated him as the top candidate of his party for the Landtag election on 31 August 2014.

In June 2021, it was revealed that the Landesamt für Verfassungsschutz Sachsen had illegally collected data about Gebhardt.
