= Anna Gorskih =

German politician (born 1992)

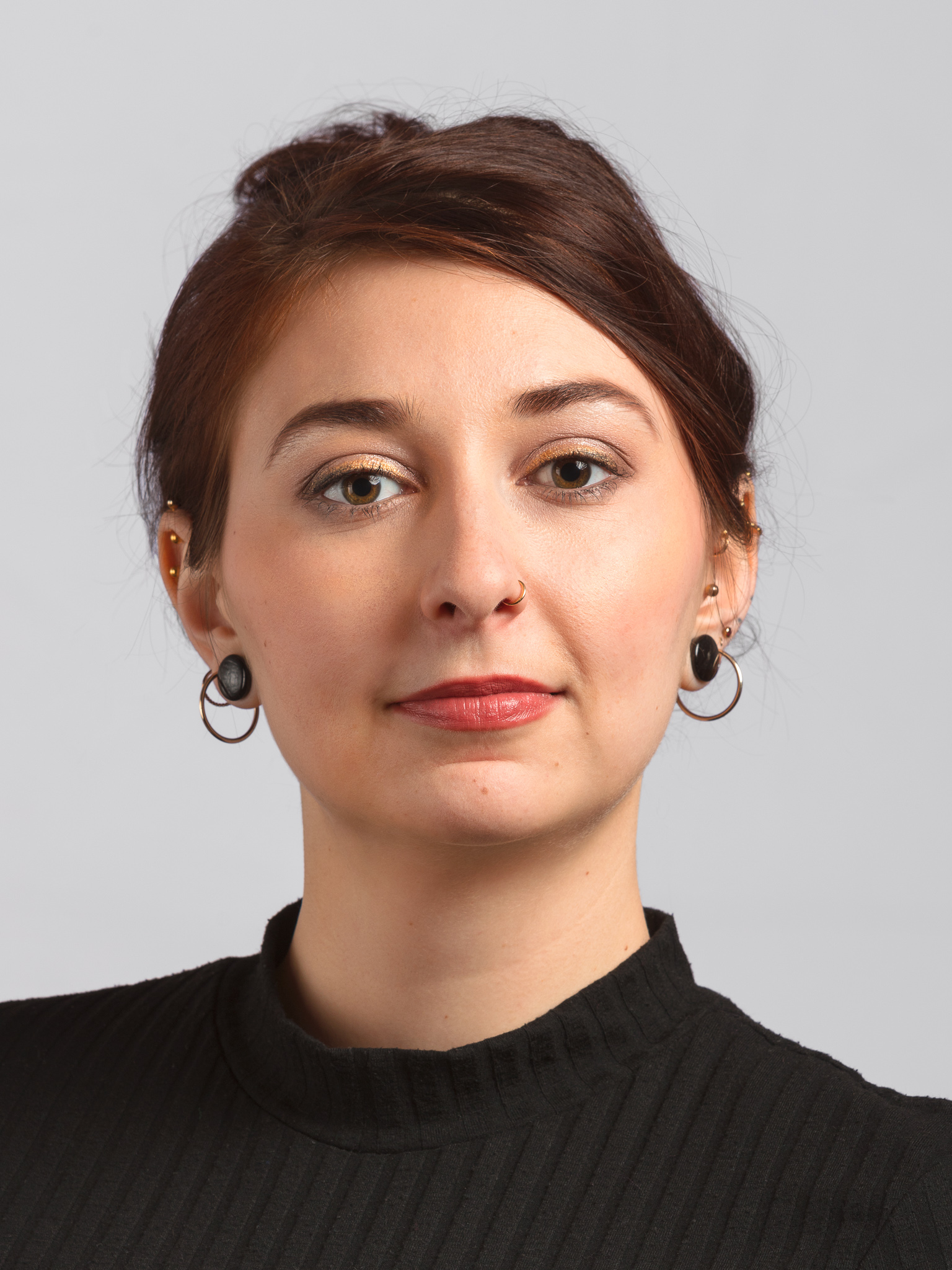
- Gorskih in 2019

Member of the Landtag of Saxony
- In office 1 October 2019 – 1 October 2024

Personal details
- Born: 1992 (age 33–34)
- Party: Die Linke

Anna Gorskih (born 1992) is a Russian-born German politician. From 2019 to 2024, she was a member of the Landtag of Saxony. She was the youngest member of Die Linke elected in the 2019 state election.
