= Sächsische Schweiz-Osterzgebirge (electoral district) =

Federal electoral district of Germany

157 Sächsische Schweiz-Osterzgebirge
- Electoral district for the Bundestag
- Sächsische Schweiz-Osterzgebirge in 2025
- State: Saxony
- Population: 245,600 (2019)
- Electorate: 199,703 (2021)
- Major settlements: Freital; Pirna; Heidenau
- Area: 1,654.2 km^{2}

Current electoral district
- Created: 2002
- Party: AfD
- Member: Steffen Janich
- Elected: 2021, 2025

Sächsische Schweiz-Osterzgebirge is an electoral constituency (German: Wahlkreis) represented in the Bundestag. It elects one member via first-past-the-post voting. Under the current constituency numbering system, it is designated as constituency 157. It is located in central Saxony, comprising the Sächsische Schweiz-Osterzgebirge district.

Sächsische Schweiz-Osterzgebirge was created for the 2002 federal election. Since 2021, it has been represented by Steffen Janich of Alternative for Germany (AfD).

== Geography ==
Sächsische Schweiz-Osterzgebirge is located in central Saxony. As of the 2021 federal election, it is coterminous with the Sächsische Schweiz-Osterzgebirge district.

== History ==
Sächsische Schweiz-Osterzgebirge was created in 2002, then known as Sächsische Schweiz – Weißeritzkreis. It acquired its current name in the 2009 election. In the 2002 through 2009 elections, it was constituency 159 in the numbering system. In the 2013 through 2021 elections, it was number 158. From the 2025 election, it has been number 157.

Originally, the constituency comprised the districts of Sächsische Schweiz and Weißeritzkreis. It acquired its current borders in the 2009 election.

Election	No.	Name	Borders
2002	159	Sächsische Schweiz – Weißeritzkreis	Sächsische Schweiz district; Weißeritzkreis district
2005	159	Sächsische Schweiz – Weißeritzkreis	Sächsische Schweiz district; Weißeritzkreis district
2009	159	Sächsische Schweiz-Osterzgebirge	Sächsische Schweiz-Osterzgebirge district
2013	158	Sächsische Schweiz-Osterzgebirge	Sächsische Schweiz-Osterzgebirge district
2017	158	Sächsische Schweiz-Osterzgebirge	Sächsische Schweiz-Osterzgebirge district
2021	158	Sächsische Schweiz-Osterzgebirge	Sächsische Schweiz-Osterzgebirge district
2025	157	Sächsische Schweiz-Osterzgebirge	Sächsische Schweiz-Osterzgebirge district

== Members ==
The constituency was first represented by Klaus Brähmig of the Christian Democratic Union (CDU) from 2002 to 2017. Frauke Petry of the AfD was elected in 2017. She left the party prior to the first sitting of the Bundestag, and sat as an independent for the rest of the term. Steffen Janich won the seat for the AfD in 2021.

Election	Member	Party	%
2002	Klaus Brähmig	CDU	46.2
2005	Klaus Brähmig	CDU	40.9
2009	Klaus Brähmig	CDU	45.1
2013	Klaus Brähmig	CDU	50.2
2017	Frauke Petry (Note: Petry was elected for the AfD, but left the party in September 2017.)	AfD	37.4
2017	Frauke Petry	Ind.	37.4
2021	Steffen Janich	AfD	33.0
2025	Steffen Janich	AfD	49.1

== Election results ==
=== 2025 election ===
Federal election (2025): Sächsische Schweiz-Osterzgebirge
Notes:	Blue background denotes the winner of the electorate vote. Pink background denotes a candidate elected from their party list. Yellow background denotes an electorate win by a list member, or other incumbent. A ✓ or ✗ denotes status of any incumbent, win or lose respectively.						
Party	Candidate	Votes	%	±%	Party votes	%	±%
AfD	✓ Steffen Janich	77,899	49.1	▲16.1	74,174	46.5	▲14.6
CDU	Peter Darmstadt	35,961	22.7	▲3.5	30,820	19.3	▲2.2
BSW					14,621	9.2	New
Left	Jörg Mumme	14,522	9.1	▼0.9	11,716	7.3	▼0.3
SPD	Fabian Funke	12,765	8.0	▼3.5	9,505	6.0	▼9.5
FW	Jens Giebe	7,007	4.4	▼1.1	2,853	1.8	▼1.5
Greens	Matthias Gottschalk	4,751	3.0	▼1.5	6,318	4.0	▼1.3
FDP	Nora Hohlfeld	4,477	2.8	▼5.7	5,170	3.2	▼8.5
Tierschutzpartei					1,774	1.1	▼0.8
Volt					822	0.5	▲0.2
BD	Maik Schulze	1,354	0.9	New	621	0.4	New
PARTEI					617	0.4	▼0.5
Pirates					229	0.1	▼0.3
Humanists					128	0.1	▼0.1
MLPD					49	<0.1	0.0
Informal votes		1,664			983		
Total valid votes		158,736			159,417		
Turnout		160,400	81.9	▲4.7			
AfD hold	Majority	41,928	26.4	▲12.6			

=== 2021 election ===
Federal election (2021): Sächsische Schweiz-Osterzgebirge
Notes:	Blue background denotes the winner of the electorate vote. Pink background denotes a candidate elected from their party list. Yellow background denotes an electorate win by a list member, or other incumbent. A ✓ or ✗ denotes status of any incumbent, win or lose respectively.						
Party	Candidate	Votes	%	±%	Party votes	%	±%
AfD	Steffen Janich	50,203	33.0	▼4.4	48,580	31.9	▼3.5
CDU	Corinna Franke‑Wöller	29,176	19.2	▼9.6	26,028	17.1	▼8.5
SPD	Fabian Funke	17,505	11.5	▲4.3	23,545	15.5	▲7.7
Left	André Hahn	15,215	10.0	▼4.7	11,653	7.7	▼5.1
FDP	Dirk Jahn	12,920	8.5	▲2.0	17,814	11.7	▲3.4
FW	Christoph Fröse	8,450	5.6		5,039	3.3	▲1.9
Independent	Klaus Brähmig	7,373	4.8				
Greens	Nino Haustein	6,830	4.5	▲1.5	8,023	5.3	▲2.3
dieBasis	Roberto Mauksch	3,161	2.1		2,945	1.9	
Tierschutzpartei					2,864	1.9	▲0.6
PARTEI					1,276	0.8	0.0
Gesundheitsforschung					929	0.6	
NPD					635	0.4	▼1.4
Pirates					618	0.4	▲0.1
Volt					450	0.3	
ÖDP	Dirk Zimmermann	848	0.6		396	0.3	0.0
Team Todenhöfer					373	0.2	
Independent	Helga Queck	358	0.2				
The III. Path					283	0.2	
Humanists					247	0.2	
Bündnis C					223	0.1	
DKP					85	0.1	
V-Partei3					82	0.1	▼0.1
MLPD					66	0.0	0.0
Informal votes		2,120			2,005		
Total valid votes		152,039			152,154		
Turnout		154,159	77.2	0.0			
AfD hold	Majority	21,027	13.8	▲5.2			

=== 2017 election ===
Federal election (2017): Sächsische Schweiz-Osterzgebirge
Notes:	Blue background denotes the winner of the electorate vote. Pink background denotes a candidate elected from their party list. Yellow background denotes an electorate win by a list member, or other incumbent. A ✓ or ✗ denotes status of any incumbent, win or lose respectively.						
Party	Candidate	Votes	%	±%	Party votes	%	±%
AfD	Frauke Petry	57,554	37.4		54,749	35.5	▲27.6
CDU	✗ Klaus Brähmig	44,354	28.8	▼21.4	39,581	25.6	▼20.3
Left	André Hahn	22,614	14.7	▼4.4	19,708	12.8	▼4.4
SPD	Klaus Wolframm	11,100	7.2	▼3.5	12,040	7.8	▼3.1
FDP	Lothar Ferdinand Brandau	9,933	6.5	▲4.6	12,795	8.3	▲5.1
Greens	Ines Kummer	4,575	3.0	0.0	4,643	3.0	▼0.6
NPD					2,875	1.9	▼3.2
FW					2,186	1.4	▼1.8
Tierschutzpartei					1,975	1.3	
PARTEI					1,278	0.8	
BGE					533	0.3	
Pirates					483	0.3	▼1.7
ÖDP					456	0.3	
BüSo	Doris Kamke	2,319	1.5	▲0.5	437	0.3	▼0.1
Independent	Roland Hoyer	1,450	0.9				
DiB					300	0.2	
V-Partei³					217	0.1	
MLPD					119	0.1	0.0
Informal votes		2,443			1,967		
Total valid votes		153,899			154,375		
Turnout		156,342	77.2	▲6.2			
AfD gain from CDU	Majority	13,200	8.6				

=== 2013 election ===
Federal election (2013): Sächsische Schweiz-Osterzgebirge
Notes:	Blue background denotes the winner of the electorate vote. Pink background denotes a candidate elected from their party list. Yellow background denotes an electorate win by a list member, or other incumbent. A ✓ or ✗ denotes status of any incumbent, win or lose respectively.						
Party	Candidate	Votes	%	±%	Party votes	%	±%
CDU	✓ Klaus Brähmig	72,644	50.2	▲5.1	66,673	46.0	▲5.7
Left	André Hahn	27,571	19.0	▼1.3	24,848	17.1	▼3.7
SPD	Klaus Wolframm	15,442	10.7	▼1.0	15,865	10.9	▼1.1
AfD					11,417	7.9	
NPD	Johannes Müller	9,625	6.6	▲0.9	7,370	5.1	▼0.5
FW	Diana Sartor	8,382	5.8		4,705	3.2	
Greens	Heidi Meißner	4,244	2.9	▼1.7	5,158	3.6	▼1.7
Pirates	Tilo Schneider	2,779	1.9		2,980	2.1	
FDP	Thomas Richter	2,628	1.8	▼9.2	4,655	3.2	▼11.1
PRO					670	0.5	
BüSo	Brigitta Gründler	1,456	1.0	▼0.5	522	0.4	▼0.8
MLPD					112	0.1	▼0.1
Informal votes		2,656			2,452		
Total valid votes		144,771			144,975		
Turnout		147,427	71.0	▲5.5			
CDU hold	Majority	45,073	31.2	▲6.4			

=== 2009 election ===
Federal election (2009): Sächsische Schweiz-Osterzgebirge
Notes:	Blue background denotes the winner of the electorate vote. Pink background denotes a candidate elected from their party list. Yellow background denotes an electorate win by a list member, or other incumbent. A ✓ or ✗ denotes status of any incumbent, win or lose respectively.						
Party	Candidate	Votes	%	±%	Party votes	%	±%
CDU	✓ Klaus Brähmig	62,530	45.1	▲4.1	56,001	40.3	▲5.2
Left	Monika Knoche	28,233	20.3	▲0.8	28,970	20.8	▲1.1
SPD	Klaus Wolframm	16,194	11.7	▼8.2	16,725	12.0	▼8.1
FDP	Thomas Richter	15,292	11.0	▲3.8	19,910	14.3	▲3.5
NPD	Olaf Rose	7,983	5.8	▼2.0	7,717	5.6	▼1.5
Greens	Heinz Grass	6,378	4.6	▲1.1	7,346	5.3	▲1.1
BüSo	Rico Schulz	2,150	1.5	▲0.3	1,621	1.2	▲0.4
REP					412	0.3	▼0.1
MLPD					258	0.2	0.0
Informal votes		2,454			2,254		
Total valid votes		138,760			138,960		
Turnout		141,214	65.5	▼12.1			
CDU hold	Majority	34,297	24.8	▲3.7			

=== 2005 election ===
Federal election (2005):Sächsische Schweiz - Weißeritzkreis
Notes:	Blue background denotes the winner of the electorate vote. Pink background denotes a candidate elected from their party list. Yellow background denotes an electorate win by a list member, or other incumbent. A ✓ or ✗ denotes status of any incumbent, win or lose respectively.						
Party	Candidate	Votes	%	±%	Party votes	%	±%
CDU	✓ Klaus Brähmig	68,426	40.9	▼5.2	58,754	35.1	▼6.5
SPD	Stephanie Fritsch	33,172	19.8	▼5.8	33,614	20.1	▼7.4
Left	Frank Protze-Lindner	32,651	19.5	▲5.0	33,065	19.8	▲5.5
NPD	Uwe Leichsenring	12,966	7.8	▲4.5	11,831	7.1	▲4.9
FDP	Alexandra Spindler	12,042	7.2	▲1.1	18,184	10.9	▲3.6
Greens	Andreas Warschau	5,798	3.5	▲0.3	6,946	4.2	▲0.4
BüSo	Rico Schulz	2,073	1.2	▲0.2	1,255	0.8	▲0.3
Alliance for Health, Peace and Social Justice					1,748	1.0	
REP					587	0.4	▼0.7
PBC					559	0.3	0.0
SGP					462	0.3	
MLPD					230	0.1	
Informal votes		3,347			3,240		
Total valid votes		167,128			167,235		
Turnout		170,475	77.6	▲4.1			
CDU hold	Majority	35,254	21.1				
