= Steffen Heitmann =

German politician (1944–2024)

Steffen Heitmann (8 September 1944 – 14 April 2024) was a German politician, church jurist and Protestant theologian. From 1990 to 2000 he served as Minister of Justice of Saxony, and was a member of the Saxon Landtag from 1994 to 2009. From 1991 until his retirement in 2015 he was a member of the Christian Democratic Union of Germany (CDU).

== Life ==
=== Childhood and youth ===
Steffen Heitmann's father died in 1945 in a Soviet prisoner of war camp and his mother died in 1957. He grew up with his grandparents.

=== Studies and Profession ===
Heitmann took his Abitur examination in Dresden in 1963, refused military service and began training at the German Evangelical Church administration. Heitmann studied theology and phylogeny at the University of Leipzig from 1964 to 1969, took state examinations in theology and in 1972 took the second theological examination. Between 1971 and 1973 he was a parish priest and pastor in the Dresden Evangelical Community. This was followed by a church legal training, which he completed in 1980 with the first and 1981 with the second juridical examination. In 1982 Heitmann became administrative director of the church district of Dresden.

== Politics ==
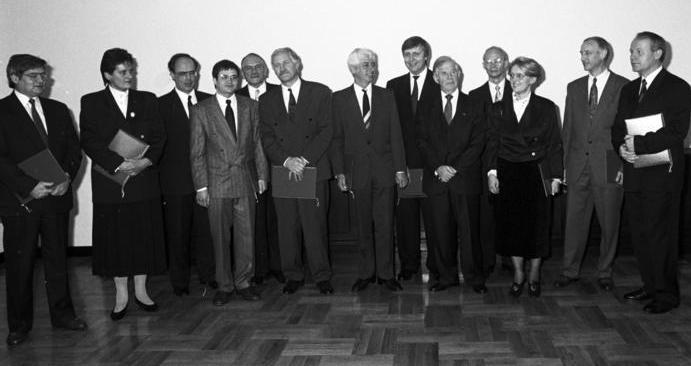
Cabinet of the Free State of Saxony, Dresden, November 1990 (Heitmann is second from the right). Bundesarchiv Bild 183-1990-1108-021

In the autumn of 1989 Heitmann was legal adviser to the Dresden "Group of 20" opposition group. In April 1990, he headed the Working Group on the Gohrisch Draft Constitution of the Free State of Saxony.

In 1990 Heitmann became State Minister of Justice of Saxony and joined the CDU in December 1991. In 1994 he was elected a member of the Saxon Landtag, representing the Dresden 2 constituency.

In 1993, Heitmann was the CDU candidate for the May 1994 election of the President of Germany, chosen by Helmut Kohl.

On 25 November 1993, after disputed statements on the role of women, the Holocaust and foreigners which were regarded as ultra-conservative or even reactionary by critics, he renounced his candidacy. The support of the FDP party in the 1994 Federal Assembly, essential to Heitmann's election, was already uncertain.

The case also points to the possibly strong effect of the media. Surveys revealed that only a minority in the population agreed with Heitmann's expressed views. An interview with Heitmann in the Süddeutsche Zeitung on 18 September 1993, brought discussions on Heitmann's political positions. In the interview Heitmann talked about the multicultural society: "I consider this concept as a misguided program. A multicultural society can not be prescribed, it can grow at all costs." On the nation, Heitmann said:"I am not afraid of the term. I am only frustrated by its misuse." On the way to dealing with the Nazi past, Heitmann posed: "The German post-war role was in a way, a continuation of the presumed special role of the Nazi period. This is over. [...] I believe that the organized death of millions of Jews in gas chambers is indeed unique – just as there are many historically unique events. There are no repeats in history anyway. But I do not believe that a special role of Germany can be derived from this until the end of history. The time has come – the post-war period has finally come to an end with German unity – to classify this event." Heitmann referred in this context to taboos, which he saw in the political culture of Germany: "The odd thing is in the Federal Republic of Germany, that there are a few areas that are taboo. There is an intellectual debate which does not necessarily correspond to the feeling of the majority of the citizens, but can not be left unpunished. And this includes foreigners. This includes the past of Germany – the Nazi past. This includes women. I believe that these debates must also be broken, even at the risk of being placed in certain corners in which one does not feel well."

Heitmann was co-editor of the week newspaper Rheinischer Merkur from 1995 to 2010. From 2003 to 2010 he was President of the Cultural Foundation of the Free State of Saxony.

In 2000 accusations were made that Heitmann, as Minister of Justice, had influenced ongoing proceedings in favor of party friends. After a complaint by the Saxon Data Protection Supervisor and after protest letters from a large number of judges, he resigned from the ministry, but rejected any wrongdoing.

He did not run for office in the 2009 state elections in Saxony.

During the refugee crisis in Europe in 2015, Heitmann wrote an open letter to Chancellor Angela Merkel in late November, protesting against the refugee policy of the CDU. In the letter he held the Chancellor responsible for an "uncontrolled stream of refugees" and said, "I have never felt so alien to my country, even in the GDR."

== Personal life and death ==
Steffen Heitmann was married to the sculptor Christine Heitmann (born 1937) from 1965; the couple had two children. In the mid 1970s, the couple used to conduct "Kellergespräche" (cellar talks) with lectures and discussions in the local cellar.

Heitmann died on 14 April 2024, at the age of 79.

== Awards ==
- 1993 Senator-Lothar-Danner-Medal
- 1997 The Eugen Bolz Prize
- 1997 Saxon constitutional medal
- 1998 Federal Service Cross, Class I

== Sources ==
- Heiko Girnth : Texte im politischen Diskurs. Ein Vorschlag zur diskursorientierten Beschreibung von Textsorten. (Texts in political discourse. A suggestion for the discursive description of texts.) Muttersprache 106.1 (1996), pp. 66–80.
- Klaus J. Groth / Joachim Schäfer : Stigmatisiert – Der Terror der Gutmenschen. (Stigmatized - The Terror of the Good People.) Aton-Verlag 2003, ISBN 3-9807644-5-1, 2nd chapter: Der Kandidat (The candidate)
- Short Biography of Heitmann, Steffen in Wer war wer in der DDR? (Who was who in the GDR?) 5th edition. Volume 1, Ch. Links, Berlin 2010, ISBN 978-3-86153-561-4.
