= Klaus Brähmig =

German politician (born 1957)

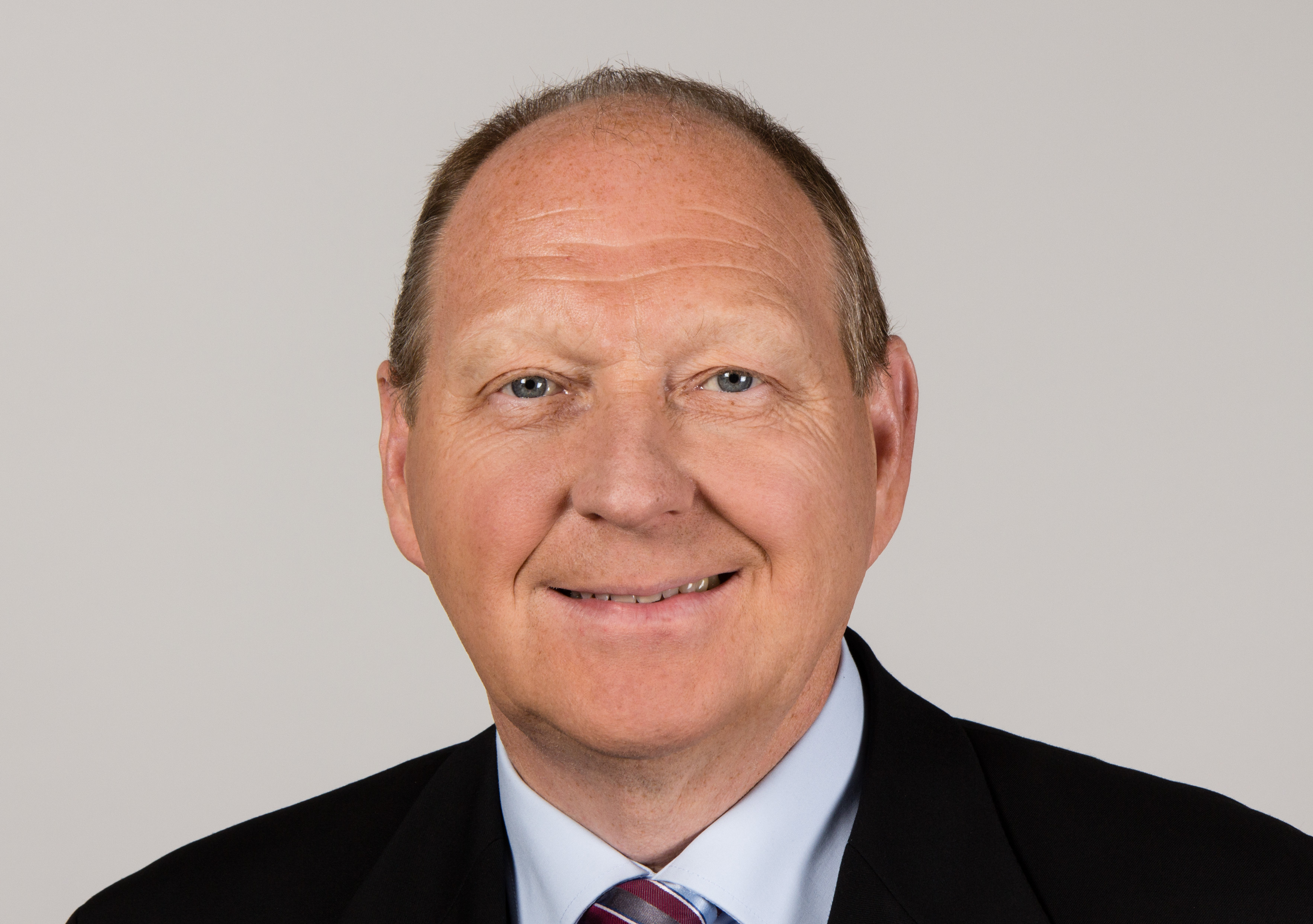
- Klaus Brähmig 2014

Member of the Bundestag
- In office 20 December 1990 – 24 October 2017

Personal details
- Born: 1 August 1957 (age 68) Königstein
- Party: CDU

Klaus Peter Brähmig (born 1 August 1957 in Königstein, Bezirk Dresden) is a German politician and member of the CDU. He represented Sächsische Schweiz-Osterzgebirge in the Bundestag from 2002 until 2017, when he lost reelection to AfD candidate Frauke Petry, who is now an independent.
