= Steffen Janich =

German politician

Member of the Bundestag for Saxony
- Incumbent
- Assumed office 26 October 2021
- Preceded by: Frauke Petry
- Constituency: Sächsische Schweiz-Osterzgebirge

Personal details
- Born: 22 January 1971 (age 55) Pirna, East Germany
- Party: CDU (before 2013); AfD (2013–present)
- Occupation: Police officer; politician

Steffen Janich (born 22 January 1971) is a German politician for Alternative for Germany (AfD). He has been a member of the German Bundestag since 2021 and represents the constituency of Sächsische Schweiz-Osterzgebirge.

Janich graduated from the Johann Wolfgang Goethe Polytechnic in Pirna and became a police officer. He was a member of the Christian Democratic Union (CDU) until 2013 after which he joined the newly formed AfD. In the 2021 German federal election, he ran both as a list candidate in Saxony and as a direct candidate for the constituency of Sächsische Schweiz-Osterzgebirge, which had previously been represented by former AfD leader Frauke Petry. With a 33% share of the vote and a 13.8% lead over Corinna Franke-Wöller (CDU), the wife of Saxony Interior Minister Roland Wöller, he won the direct mandate as a member of the German Bundestag.
