= Fabian Funke =

German politician (born 1997)

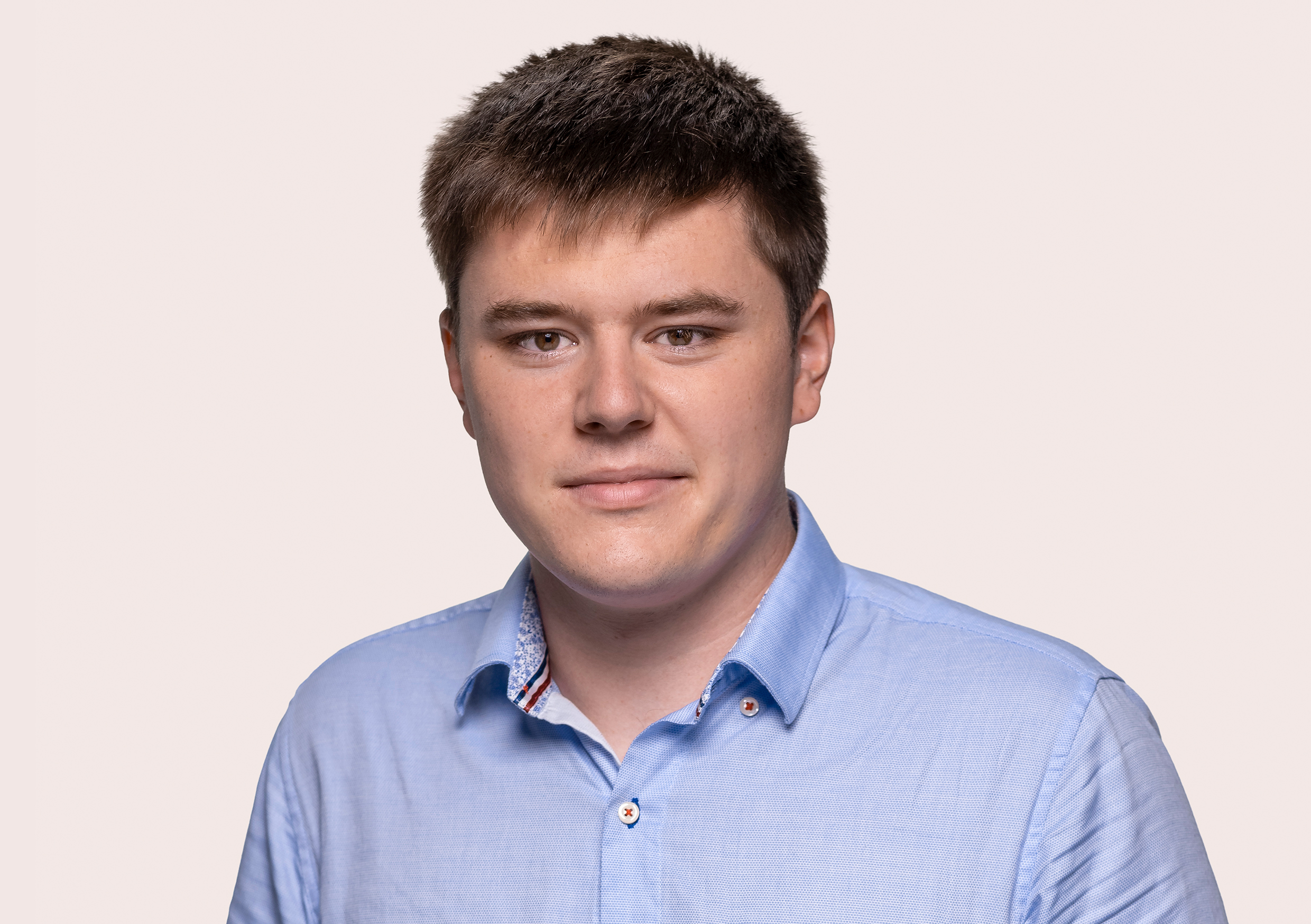

Member of the Bundestag
- Incumbent
- Assumed office 26 October 2021

Personal details
- Born: 25 July 1997 (age 29) Dresden, Germany
- Party: Social Democratic Party
- Education: University of Erfurt

Fabian Funke (born 25 July 1997) is a German politician of the Social Democratic Party (SPD) who has been serving as a member of the Bundestag since the 2021 elections, representing the Sächsische Schweiz-Osterzgebirge district.

== Life ==
Funke was born in Dresden and completed his school career in 2016 with the Abitur at the Johann-Gottfried-Herder-Gymnasium in Pirna. From 2017 to 2020, Funke completed a bachelor's degree in international relations at the University of Erfurt.

He then began a master's degree in international relations with a focus on global political economy at the Technical University of Dresden in 2020. During his studies, Funke worked as an employee of state parliament member Dagmar Neukirch between 2018 and 2019. From 2020 to 2021 he was parliamentary group leader of the SPD in the Saxon Switzerland-Eastern Ore Mountains district council. Funke joined the SPD in 2017. Since 2018 he has been a member of the SPD district executive committee in the Saxon Switzerland-Eastern Ore Mountains district. In 2021 he was elected chairman of the Jusos in Saxony.

== Political career ==
In parliament, Funke has been serving on the Committee on European Affairs and the Committee on Human Rights and Humanitarian Aid.

In addition to his committee assignments, Funke has been a member of the German delegation to the Parliamentary Assembly of the Council of Europe (PACE) since 2022. In the Assembly, he serves on the Committee on Migration, Refugees and Displaced Persons and the Sub-Committee on External Relations.

Within his parliamentary group, Funke is part of a working group on integration and migration, chaired by Lars Castellucci. He also belongs to the Parliamentary Left, a left-wing movement within the SPD group.
