= Jürgen Martens =

German politician

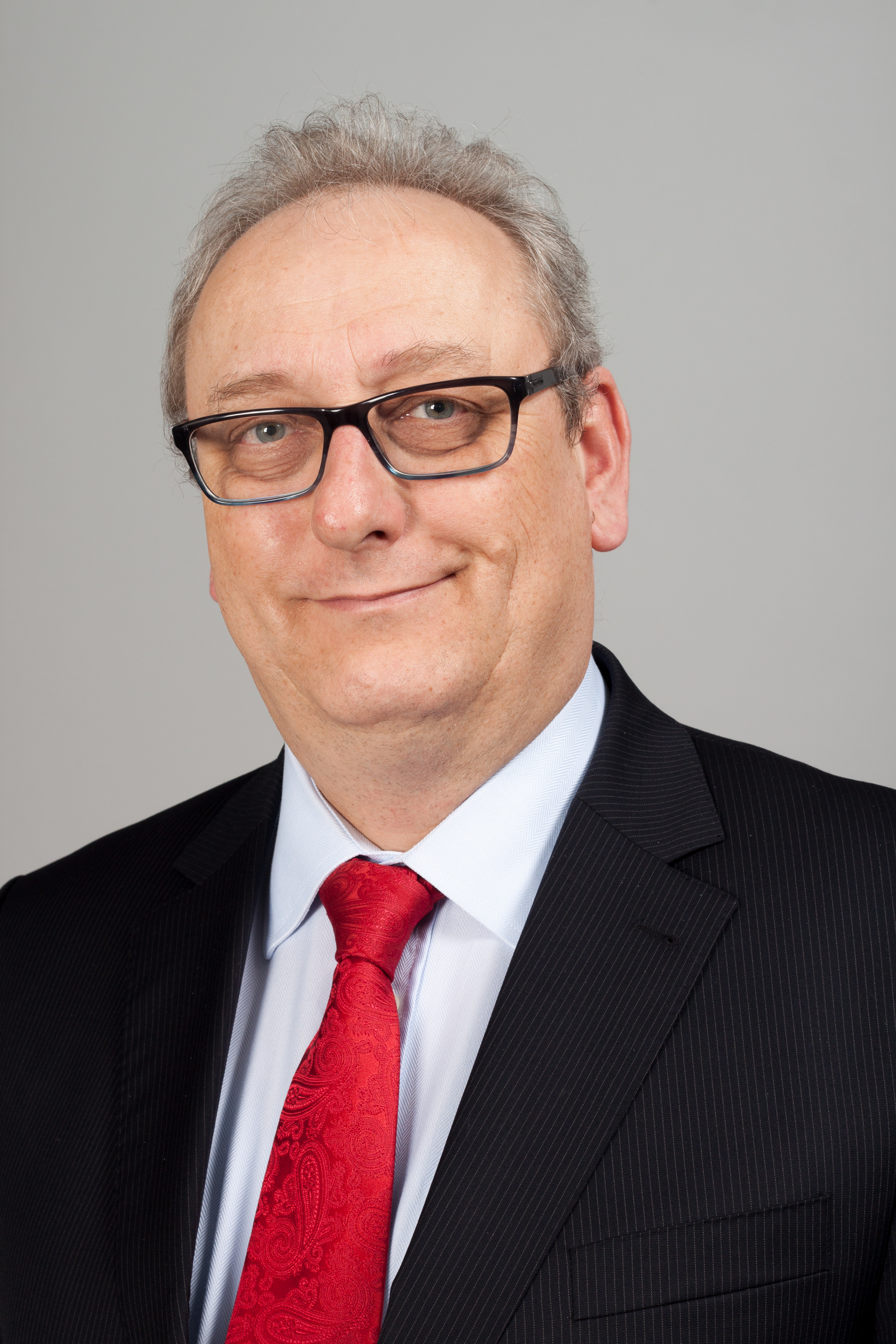
- Jürgen Martens in 2013

Member of the Bundestag
- Incumbent
- Assumed office 2017

Personal details
- Born: 3 August 1959 (age 67) Munich, West Germany (now Germany)
- Party: FDP
- Education: University of Freiburg
- Occupation: Lawyer

Jürgen Martens (born 3 August 1959) is a German lawyer and politician of the Free Democratic Party (FDP) who has been serving as a member of the Bundestag from the state of Saxony since 2017.

== Early life and education ==
Martens was born in Munich, Bavaria. After completing his community service, he began studying law at the University of Freiburg and completed his studies in 1986 with the 1st state examination. This was followed by a traineeship during which he worked, among other things, at the Administrative Court of Baden-Württemberg, the State Parliament of Baden-Württemberg and in 1987/88 at the Directorate-General for Agriculture/Fraud Prevention of the European Commission in Brussels. After the 2nd state examination, Martens was admitted to the bar in Lörrach in 1990.

== Political career ==
Martens joined the FDP in 1976. He was a member of the State Parliament of Saxony from 2004 until 2014. From 2009 to 2014 he was State Minister of Justice in the government of Minister-President Stanislaw Tillich of Saxony. In this capacity, he represented the state at the European Committee of the Regions from 2010 until 2014.

Martens became a member of the Bundestag in the 2017 German federal election. In parliament, he is a member of the Committee on Legal Affairs and Consumer Protection. He serves as his parliamentary group's spokesperson on legal affairs. He is an alternate member of the Committee on the Election of Judges (Wahlausschuss), which is in charge of appointing judges to the Federal Constitutional Court of Germany.

In addition to his committee assignments, Martens is part of the German-French Parliamentary Friendship Group. Since 2019, he has been a member of the German delegation to the Franco-German Parliamentary Assembly.
