= Jörg Urban =

German politician (born 1964)

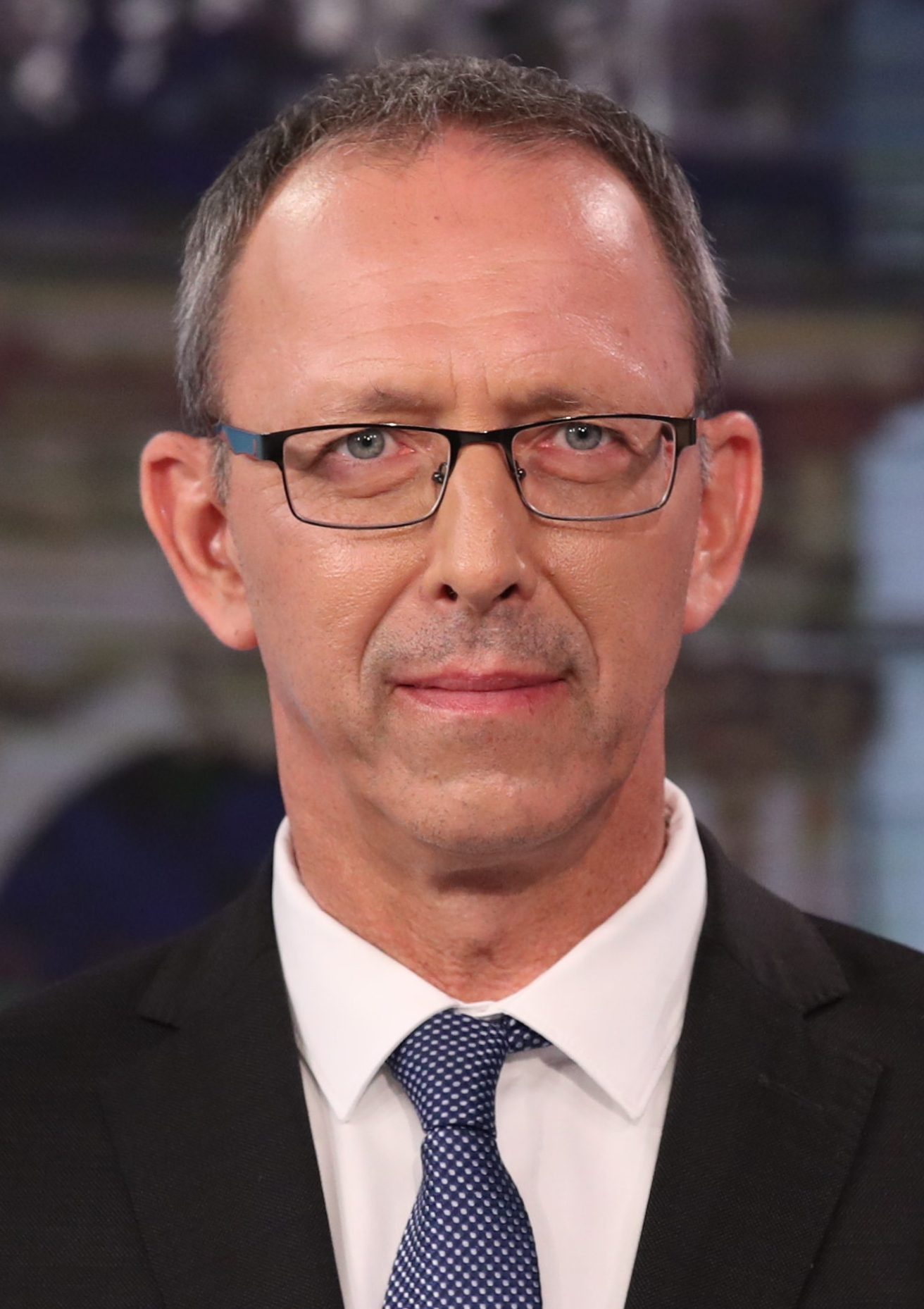
- Urban in 2019

Leader of the Opposition in the Landtag of Saxony
- Incumbent
- Assumed office 20 December 2019
- Preceded by: Rico Gebhardt

Leader of the Alternative for Germany in Saxony
- Incumbent
- Assumed office 26 September 2017
- Preceded by: Frauke Petry

Leader of the Alternative for Germany in the Landtag of Saxony
- Incumbent
- Assumed office 30 September 2017
- Preceded by: Frauke Petry

Member of the Landtag of Saxony
- Incumbent
- Assumed office 29 September 2014
- Constituency: List

Personal details
- Born: 4 August 1964 (age 62) Meissen, East Germany
- Party: Alternative for Germany
- Children: 3
- Education: TU Dresden

Military service
- Allegiance: National People's Army

Jörg Urban (born 4 August 1964) is a German politician for the Alternative for Germany (AfD) party and is party leader of the AfD in Saxony. He has been a member of the Landtag of the Free State of Saxony since 2014. Under Urban's leadership, the Saxon AfD moved so strongly towards the right wing that the State Office for the Protection of the Constitution has categorised and is monitoring the party as a "proven right-wing anti constitutional effort" in 2023. The party has been labeled as a far-right organization.

== Career ==
Urban was born in 1964 in Meissen. He completed three years of voluntary military service with the National People's Army and studied hydraulic engineering at the Dresden University of Technology.

Urban was formerly affiliated with Grüne Liga, an East German conservationist political movement. He was also briefly a member of German Pirate Party.

In 2013, Urban became a member of the AfD and ran for the City Council of Dresden. Until November 2014 he was chairman of the AfD district association in Dresden. He was elected to the Landtag of Saxony in 2014 on a list seat. In 2017, he succeeded Frauke Petry as the leader of the AfD party in the state of Saxony and the leader of the AfD parliamentary group in the Landtag of Saxony. After the 2019 elections, the AfD became the second largest party in the Saxon landtag, and Urban became the Leader of the Opposition.

He has described AfD and Pegida as "the same movement", and has spoken at Pegida rallies after open cooperation with the group was permitted by the AfD in 2018.

In March 2023 Urban stated that he aims to be top candidate for 2024 Saxony State election. AfD-federal chairmen Tino Chrupalla is supporting Urban.

== Personal life ==
Jörg Urban has lived in Dresden since 1986, is married, has three children. He is a Non-denominational Christian.
