= Felix Hitzig =

German politician (born 1988)

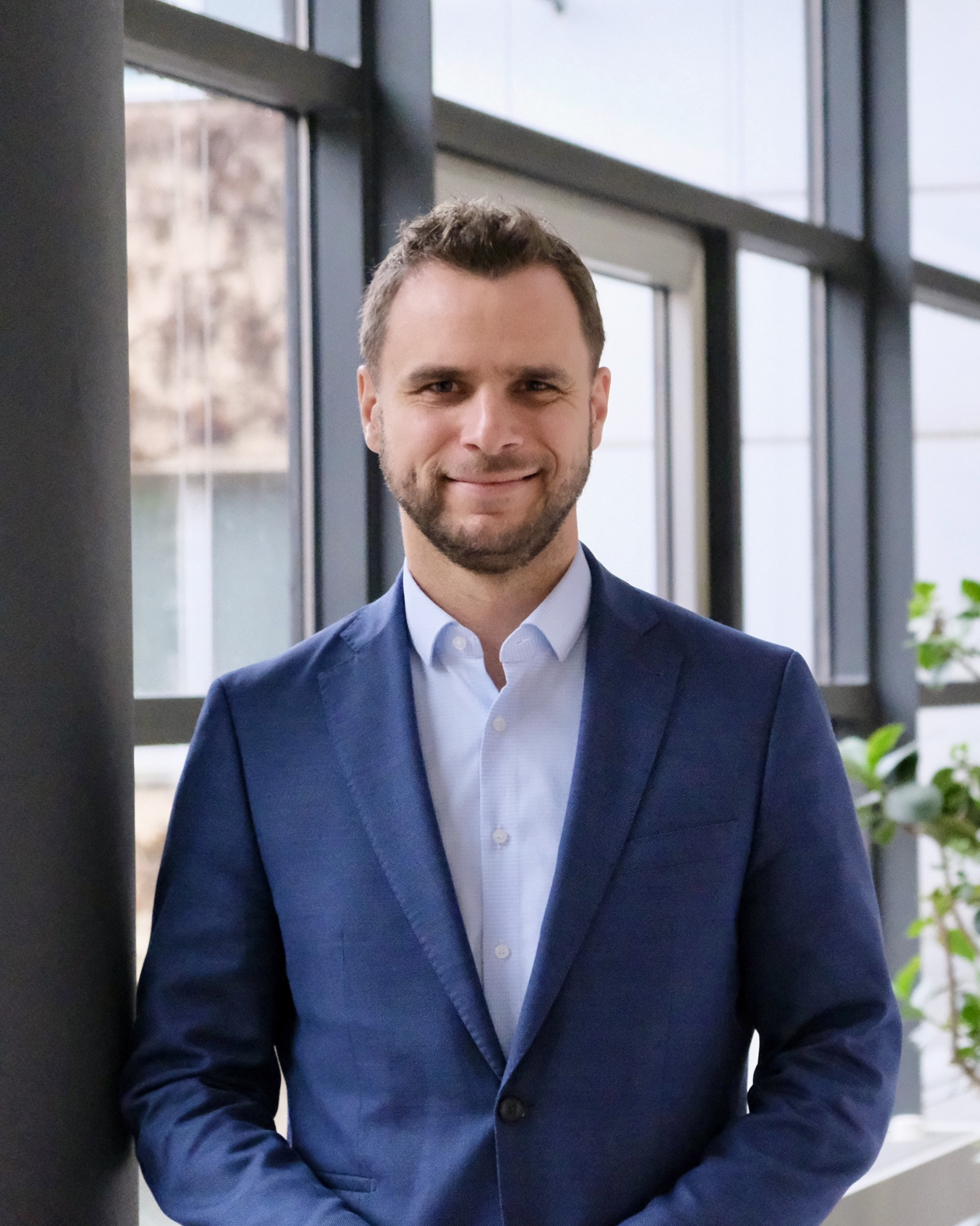
- Hitzig in 2025

Member of the Landtag of Saxony
- Incumbent
- Assumed office 1 September 2024
- Preceded by: Barbara Klepsch
- Constituency: Dresden 7

Personal details
- Born: 27 October 1988 (age 37) Lichtenstein, Saxony
- Party: Christian Democratic Union (since 2013)

Felix Hitzig (born 27 October 1988 in Lichtenstein, Saxony) is a German politician serving as a member of the Landtag of Saxony since 2024. He has served as chairman of the Christian Democratic Union in Western Dresden since 2019.
