= Saxon State Ministry of Justice and for Democracy, European Affairs and Equality =

Ministry of justice in Saxony, Germany

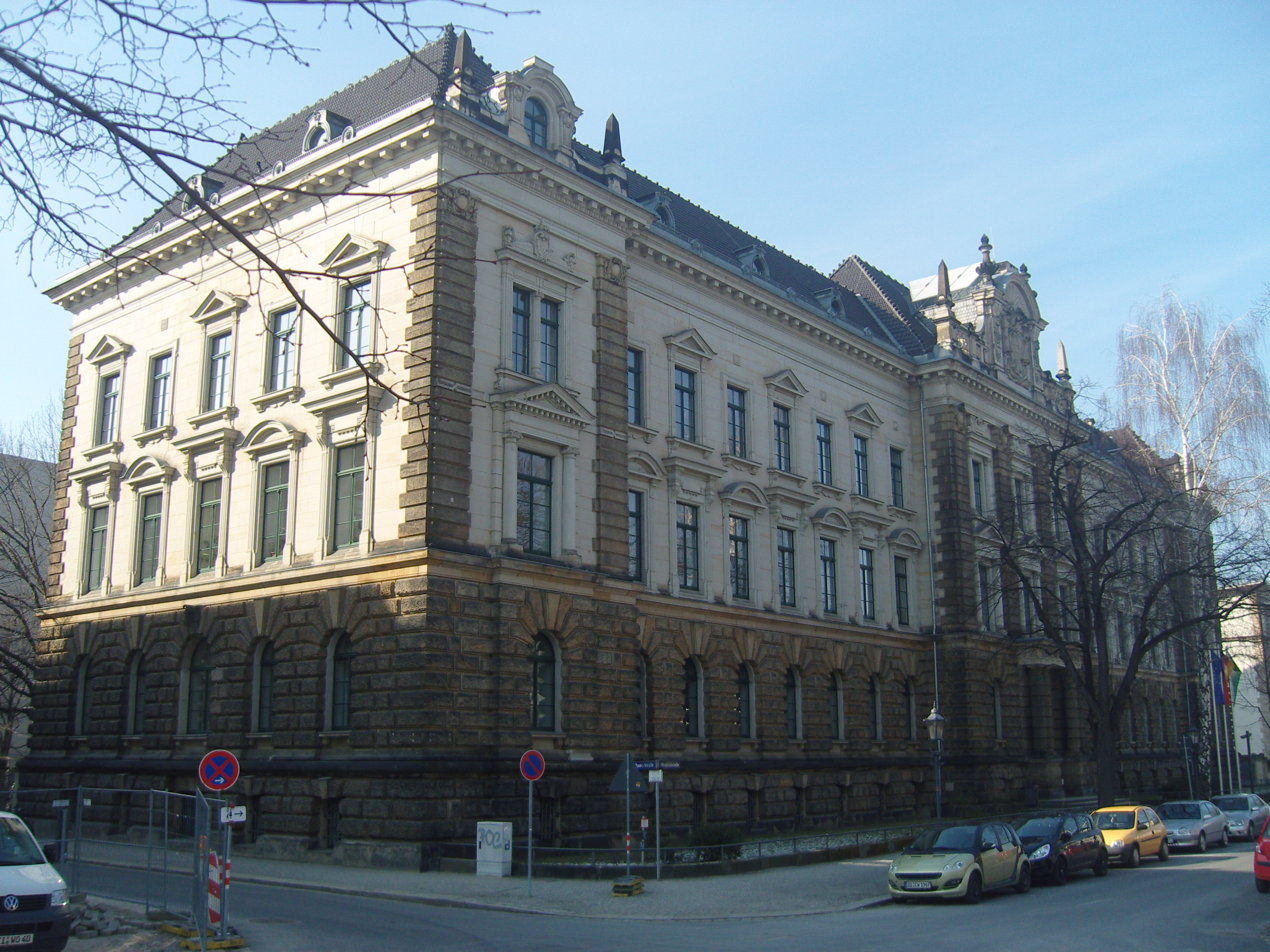
Ministry building, Dresden

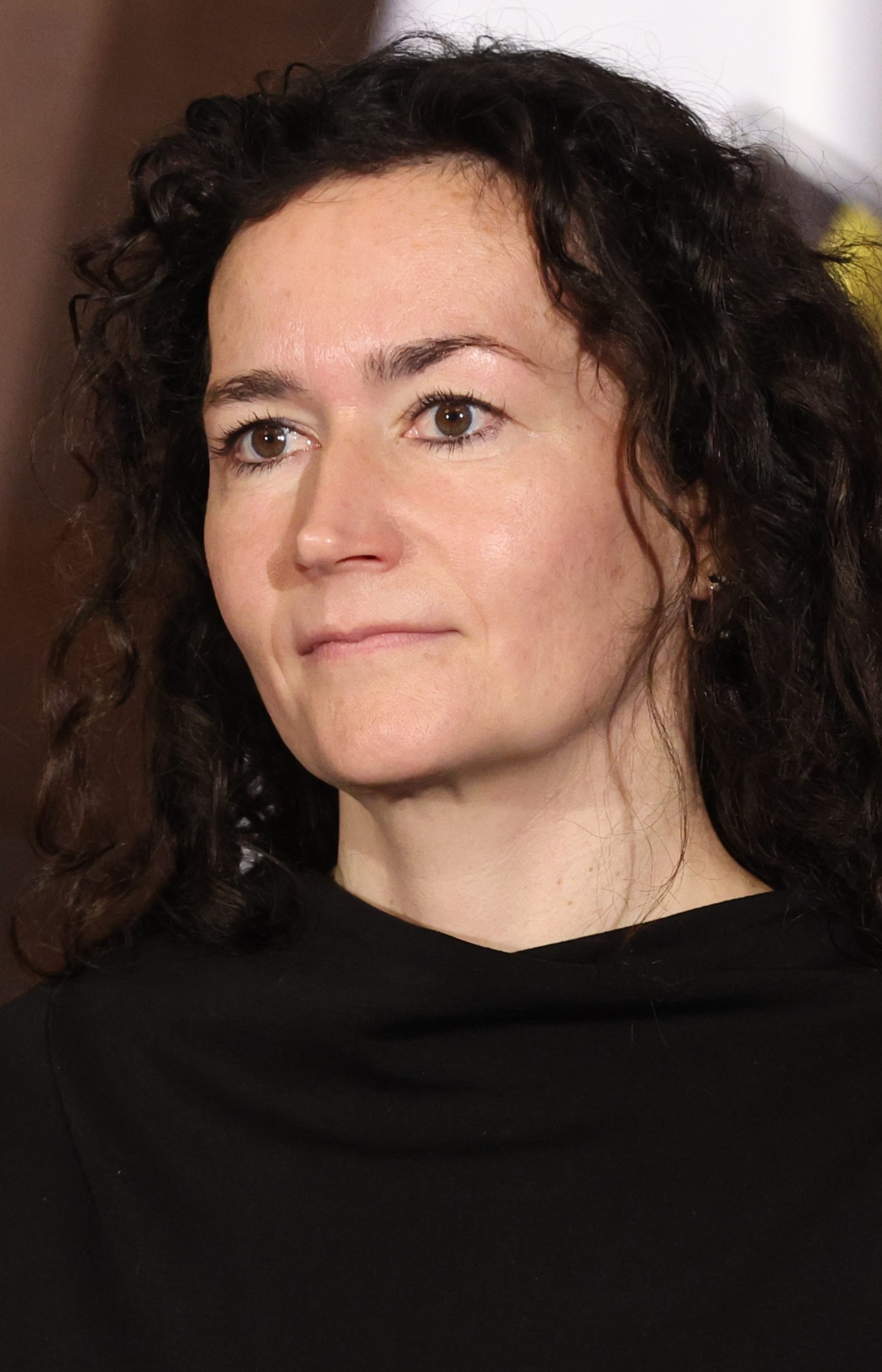
Incumbent minister Constanze Geiert

The Saxon State Ministry of Justice and for Democracy, European Affairs and Gender Equality (Sächsisches Staatsministerium der Justiz und für Demokratie, Europa und Gleichstellung) is the Ministry of Justice of the Government of the Free State of Saxony. The current minister is Katja Meier. Since 2019, the scope includes democracy (citizen's participation and political education), representation of Saxon interests in the European Union, and gender equality, anti-discrimination and protection from violence.

== List of ministers of Justice of Saxony ==
Since the re-forming of Saxony in 1990, the following have served as state ministers of justice:

- Steffen Heitmann (1990–2000)
- Manfred Kolbe (2000–2002)
- Thomas de Maizière (2002–2004)
- Geert Mackenroth (2004–2009)
- Jürgen Martens (2009–2014)
- Sebastian Gemkow (2014–2019)
- Katja Meier (2019–2024)
- Constanze Geiert (2024–present)
