= Landesamt für Verfassungsschutz Sachsen =

Agency overview
- Formed: November 3, 1992
- Headquarters: Dresden
- Employees: 187 (2014)
- Minister responsible: Markus Ulbig, Minister of the Interior
- Agency executive: Gordian Meyer-Plath, President
- Parent department: Saxon Ministry of State for the Interior
- Key document: Sächsisches Verfassungssschutzgesetz
- Website: www.lfv.sachsen.de

The Landesamt für Verfassungsschutz Sachsen (State Office for the Protection of the Constitution Saxony) is the domestic intelligence agency of the German federal state of Saxony. Its main function is the observation and surveillance of anti-constitutional activities in the German state of Saxony.

The office is subordinate to the Saxon Ministry of State for the Interior. It cooperates with the federal agency, the Bundesamt für Verfassungsschutz, and the 15 other state agencies. With currently 187 employees, the office is based in Dresden. Its work is governed by a state law.

The office monitors extremist activities by the far-right, the far-left, as well as "foreigner extremism" including Islamism, and espionage activities.
