= Katja Meier =

German politician (born 1979)

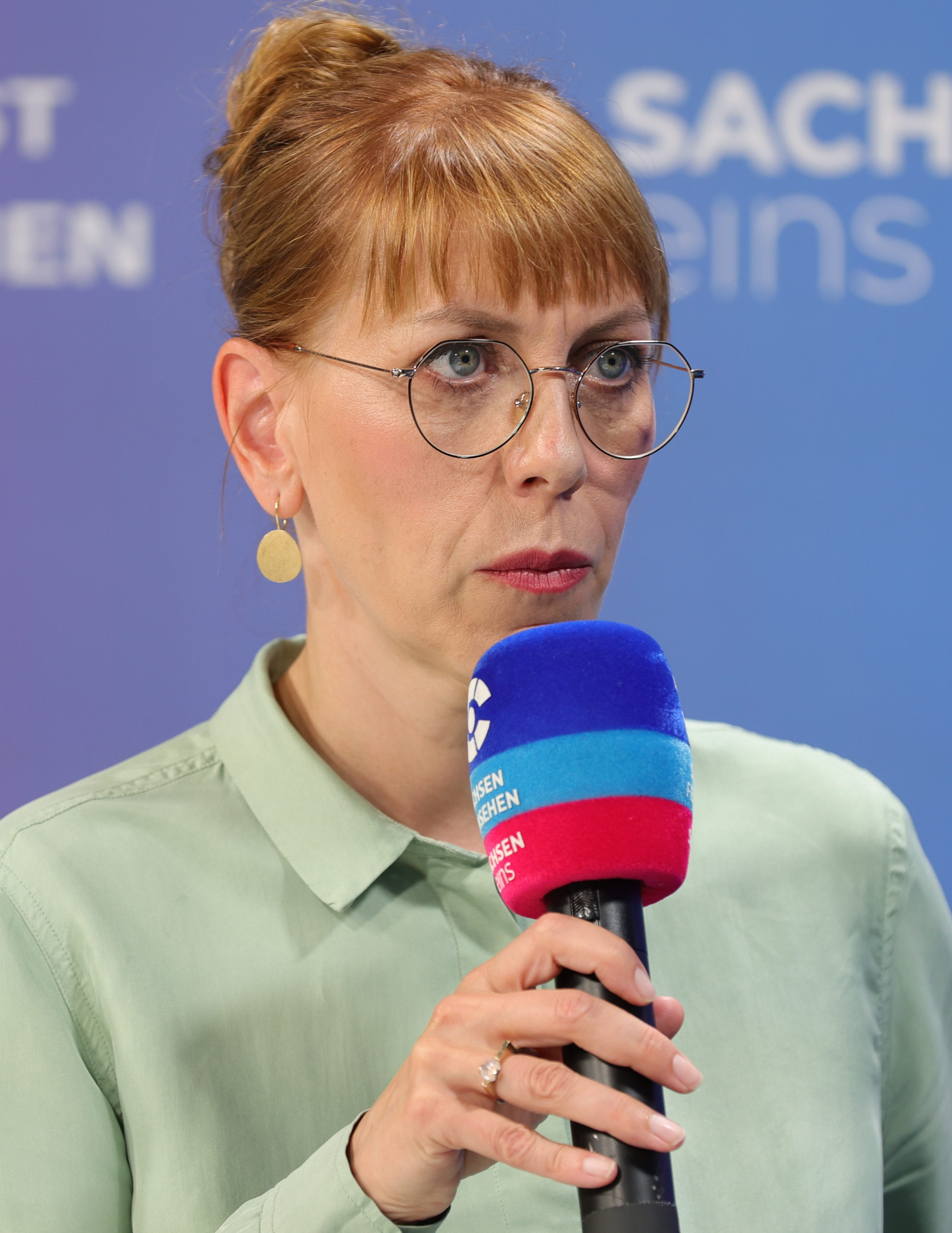
- Katja Meier in 2024

Saxon State Minister of Justice and for Democracy, Europe and Equality
- Incumbent
- Assumed office 20 December 2019
- Preceded by: Sebastian Gemkow

Member of the Landtag of Saxony
- In office 2015–2020

Personal details
- Born: 10 September 1979 (age 47) Zwickau, East Germany
- Party: Greens
- Education: University of Münster

Katja Meier (born 10 September 1979) is a German politician who is a member of Alliance 90/The Greens. She was a member of the Landtag of Saxony 2015-2020 and has been serving as Saxon State Minister of Justice and for Democracy, European Affairs and Equality since 20 December 2019.

== Early life and education ==
Meier was born in Zwickau. In the 1990s, she played bass in a local punk band called Harlekin. After passing her Abitur in 1998, she studied political science, modern and contemporary history and sociology at the Universities of Jena, Tartu, and Münster, graduating with a MA degree in 2004.

== Political career ==
Meier became a member of the Greens in 2005 and became a member of the Landtag of Saxony in 2015, after the originally elected Eva Jähnigen gave up her seat. Jointly with Wolfram Günther, she was elected as her party's top candidate in the 2019 Saxony state election. Subsequent coalition talks led to a black-red-green coalition under Minister-President Michael Kretschmer, and Meier was given the post of Saxon State Minister of Justice and for Democracy, Europe and Equality on 20 December 2019, and subsequently gave up her seat in the Landtag on 9 January 2020.

== Controversies ==
In early 2020, videos of the punk band Meier had been playing bass guitar in as a teenager surfaced, including an anti-police song with violent lyrics ("Advent, Advent, a cop is burning. First one, then two, then three", paraphrasing the well known advent song and children's rhyme Advent, Advent, ein Lichtlein brennt). Meier was attacked by politicians of the far right Alternative for Germany over this; she distanced herself from any support of violence, and was supported by politicians from other parties.

After Meier raised a rainbow flag in front of her ministry building to celebrate Christopher Street Day 2020, a citizen took the ministry to court for violation of neutrality. The courts allowed the flag to stay.

Meier was nominated by her party as delegate to the Federal Convention for the purpose of electing the President of Germany in 2022.

== Personal life ==
Meier lives in Dresden. Her partner is Josefine Paul, chairwoman of the Green group in the Landtag of North Rhine-Westphalia.
