= Markus Ulbig =

German politician

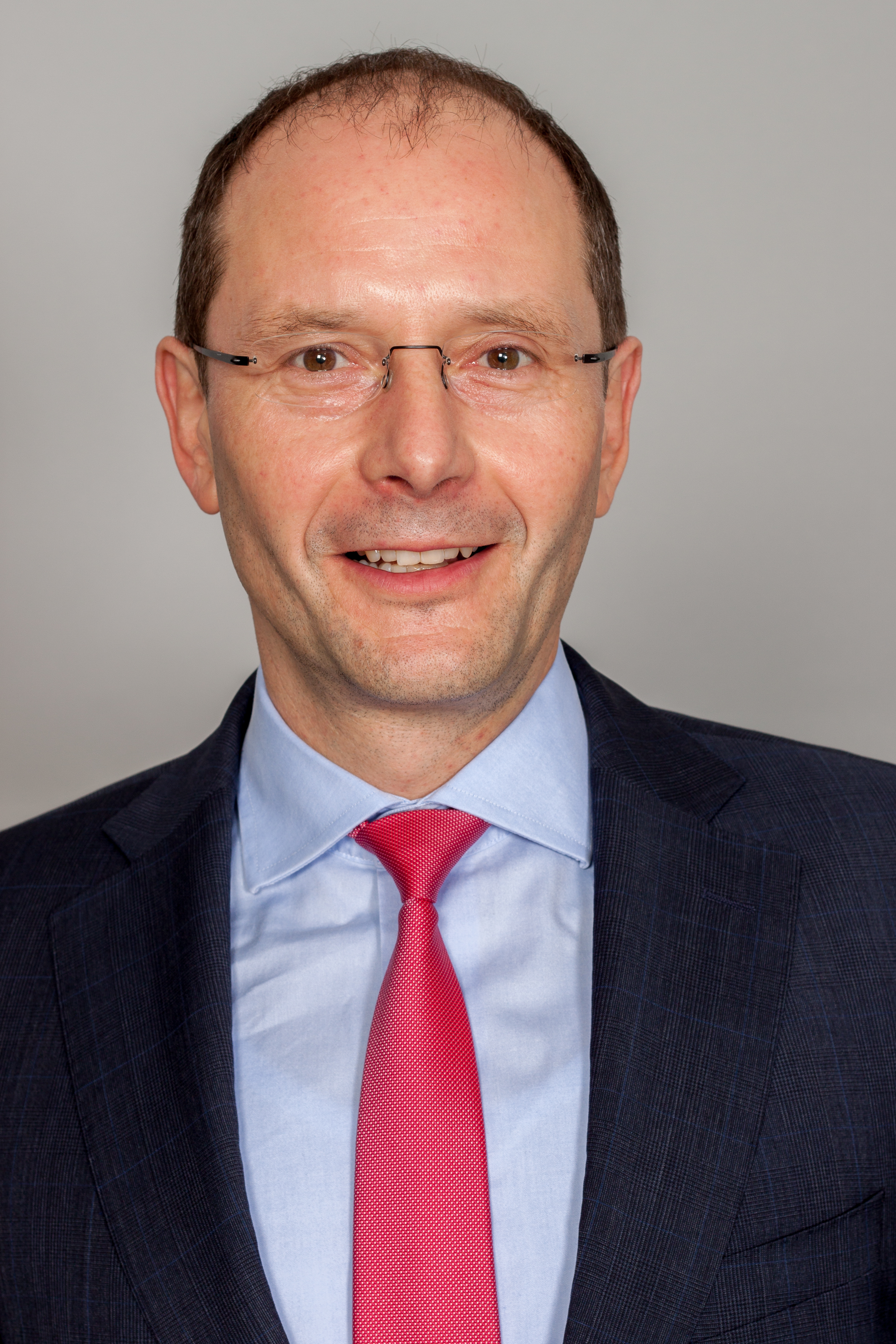
- Ulbig in 2013

Saxon Minister of the Interior
- Incumbent
- Assumed office September 2009

Mayor of Pirna
- In office 2001–2009

Personal details
- Born: 1 April 1964 (age 62) Zinnwald, Bezirk Dresden, East Germany (now Germany)
- Citizenship: German
- Party: Christian Democratic Union (CDU)
- Website: www.markus-ulbig.de

Markus Ulbig (born 1 April 1964 in Zinnwald, Bezirk Dresden) is a German politician and member of the Christian Democratic Union of Germany (CDU). He worked in Pirna, became its mayor in 2001, and has been Minister of Interior of the German federal state of Saxony since 2009.

== Early life and career ==
Born and raised in East Germany, Ulbig finished training as an electronics technician and worked in that field until 1990. After German reunification, he joined the Christian Democratic Union and was hired as the personal assistant of the mayor of Pirna, in the region of Saxon Switzerland. He studied in Dresden and Zittau for a Bachelor of Business Administration.

== Political career ==
On 1 August 2001, Ulbig was elected mayor of Pirna. After a number of incidents to counter the rise of Neo-Nazism Ulbig became the honorary patron of the Pirnaer Initiative against extremism and for civil courage. The initiatives helped to restore tourism. Since January 2005 Ulbig has also been a member of the anti-nuclear weapons movement Mayors for Peace

On 8 June 2008, Ulbig was reelected mayor of Pirna. Only 4 months later he was appointed Minister of the Interior of Saxony. As one of his state's representatives at the Bundesrat, he serves on the Committee on Internal Affairs; Committee on Urban Development, Housing and Regional Planning; and the Defence Committee. He also chairs the Conference of Interior Ministers (IMK).

In the negotiations to form a Grand Coalition of the Christian Democrats and the Social Democrats (SPD) following the 2013 federal elections, Ulbig was part of the CDU/CSU delegation in the working group on integration and migration, led by Maria Böhmer and Aydan Özoğuz.

In the 2014 state elections, Ulbig was elected a member of the Landtag of Saxony, and in November 2014, he was nominated as a candidate in the election for Dresden's mayorship in June 2015.

== Political positions ==
In 2012, Ulbig received a German Big Brother Award for requesting the mass surveillance of over 55,000 cellular phones gathering over a million call detail records, when on 19 February 2011 some 20,000 antifascists gathered to protest against the annual neo-Nazi march in Dresden.
