= The Blue Party (Germany) =

The Blue Party Die blaue Partei
- Leader: Frauke Petry
- Deputy Leaders: Thomas Strobel; Hubertus von Below; Michael Muster
- Founder: Michael Muster (legally)
- Founded: 17 September 2017
- Dissolved: 31 December 2019
- Split from: Alternative for Germany
- Headquarters: Berlin, Germany
- Think tank: The Blue Change (Die Blaue Wende)
- Ideology: National conservatism; Economic liberalism
- Political position: Right-wing
- European Parliament group: Europe of Nations and Freedom
- Colours: Blue

Website
- www.dieblauepartei.de (archived copy)

The Blue Party (German: Die blaue Partei) was a minor political party in Germany that existed from 2017 to 2019. It was founded by Frauke Petry after resigning as leader of the Alternative for Germany party (AfD). It entered candidates in elections to German state parliaments, but received few votes. The party dissolved itself at the end of 2019.

== History ==
The party was registered with the Federal Returning Officer in September 2017 and published its program in the following month. Its policies were intended to attract voters who believed that the Christian Democratic Union of Germany had become too liberal under Angela Merkel and that the Alternative for Germany had become too nationalist.

The Blue Party first stood for election in the 2019 Saxony state elections with Petry as its lead candidate. The party received 7,786 votes, which corresponds to 0.4% of the valid votes. In the 2019 Thuringian state elections, the party received 857 votes, 0.1% of all valid votes.

Petry announced on 5 November 2019 that the party would dissolve by the end of the year due to its results in the state elections in Saxony and Thuringia. It formally ceased to exist from 31 December 2019.
