= 2019 Saxony state election =

← 2014	1 September 2019	2024 →

All 119 seats in the Landtag of Saxony 60 seats needed for a majority
- Turnout: 2,166,457 (66.5%) ▲17.4 pp
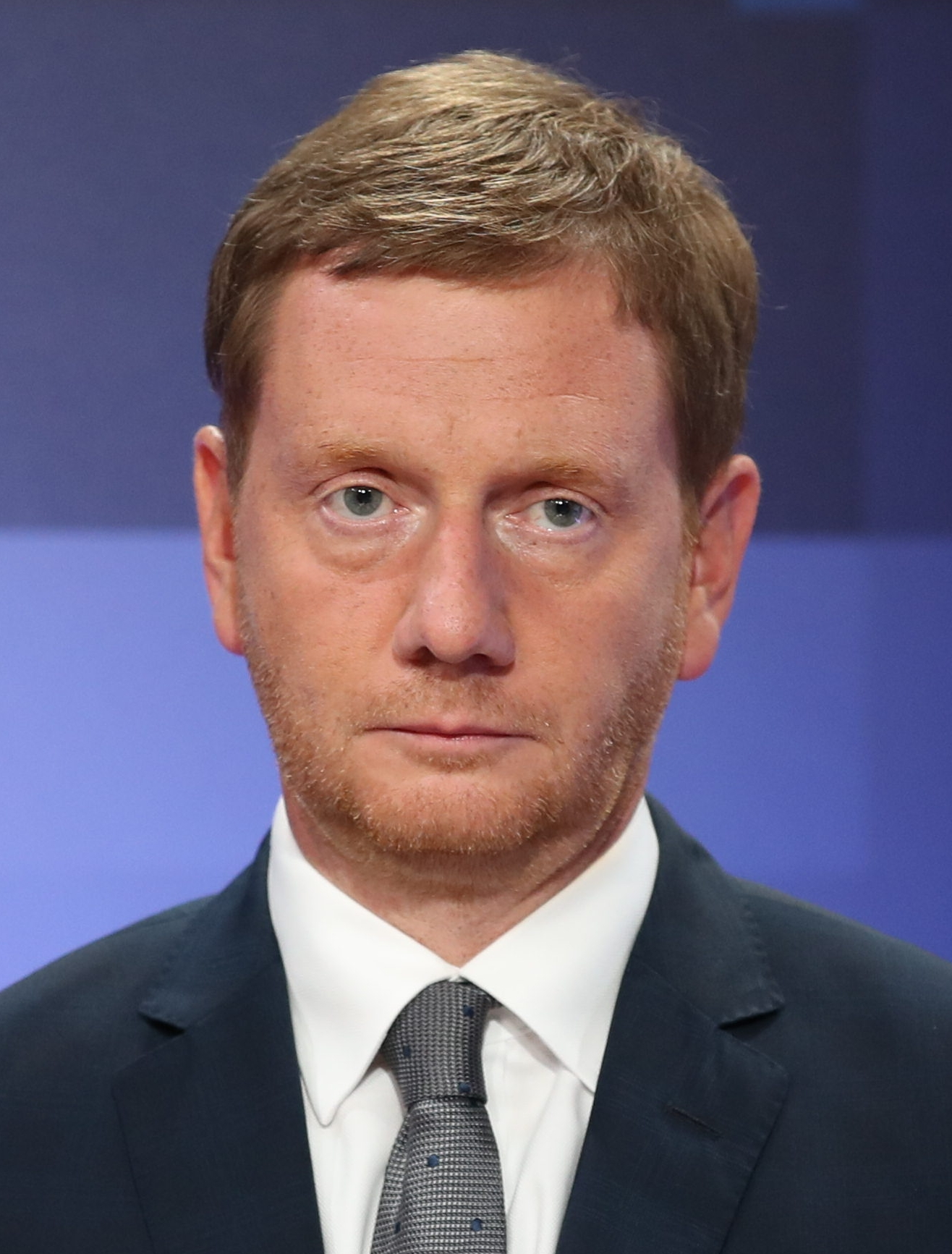

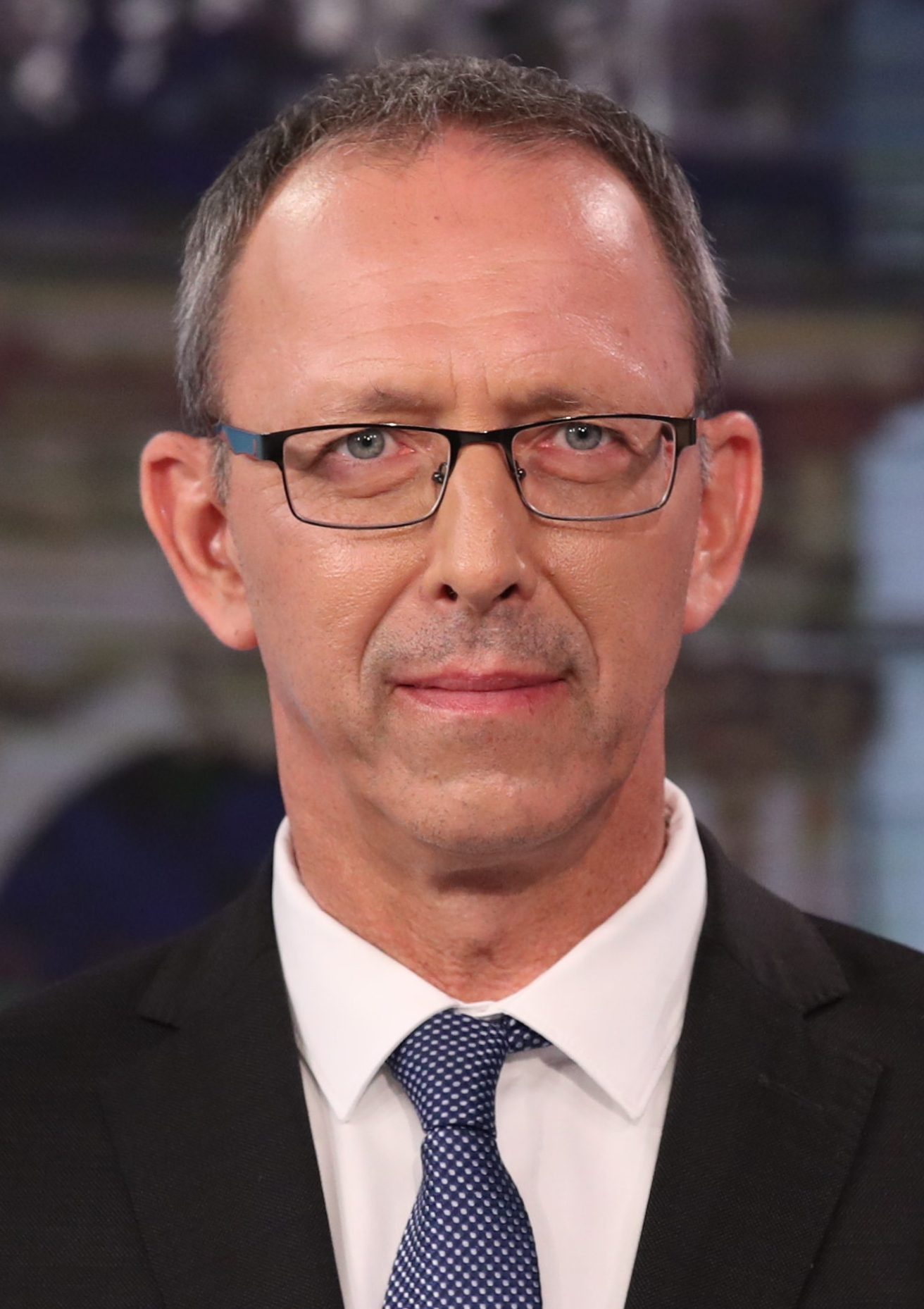

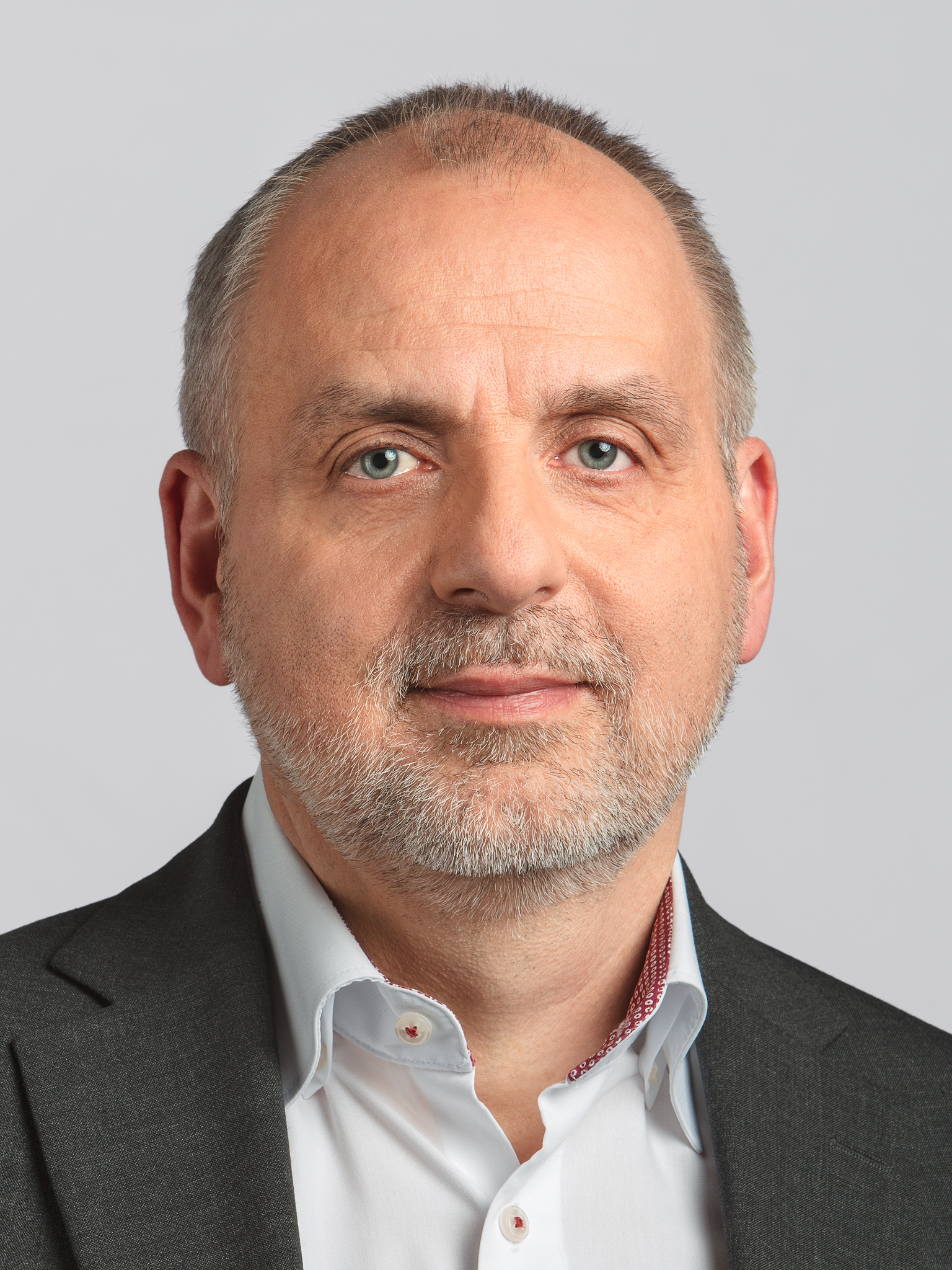

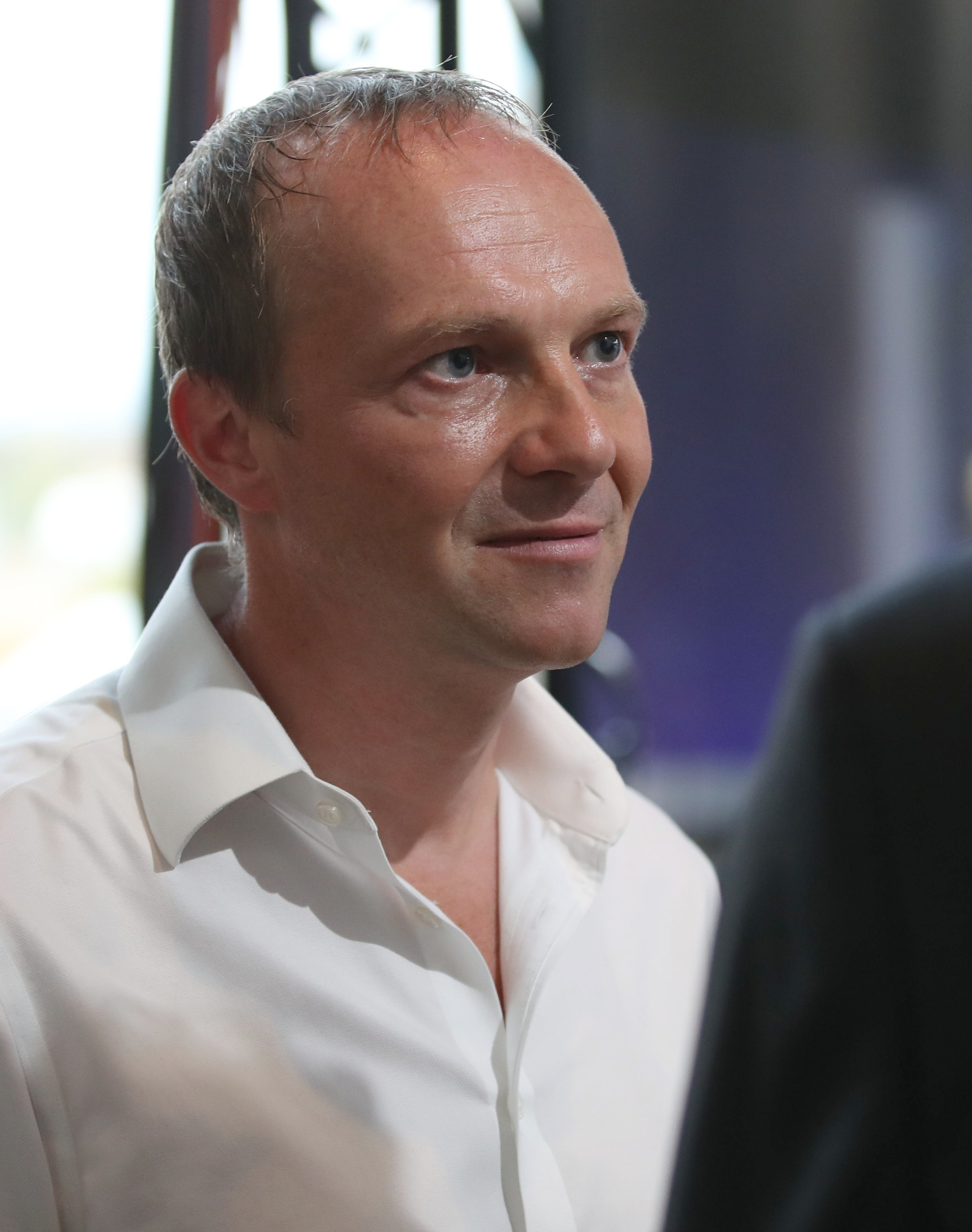

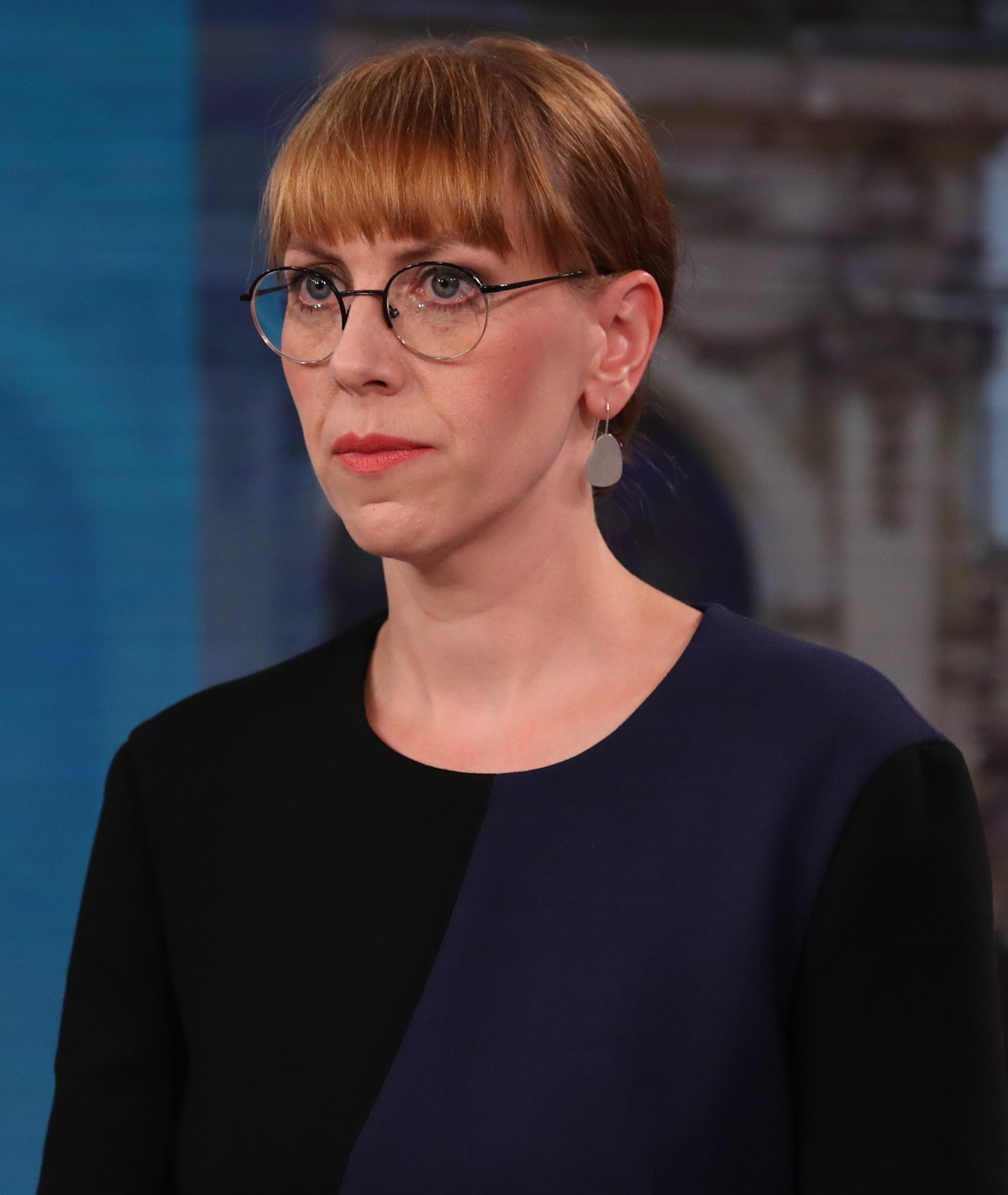

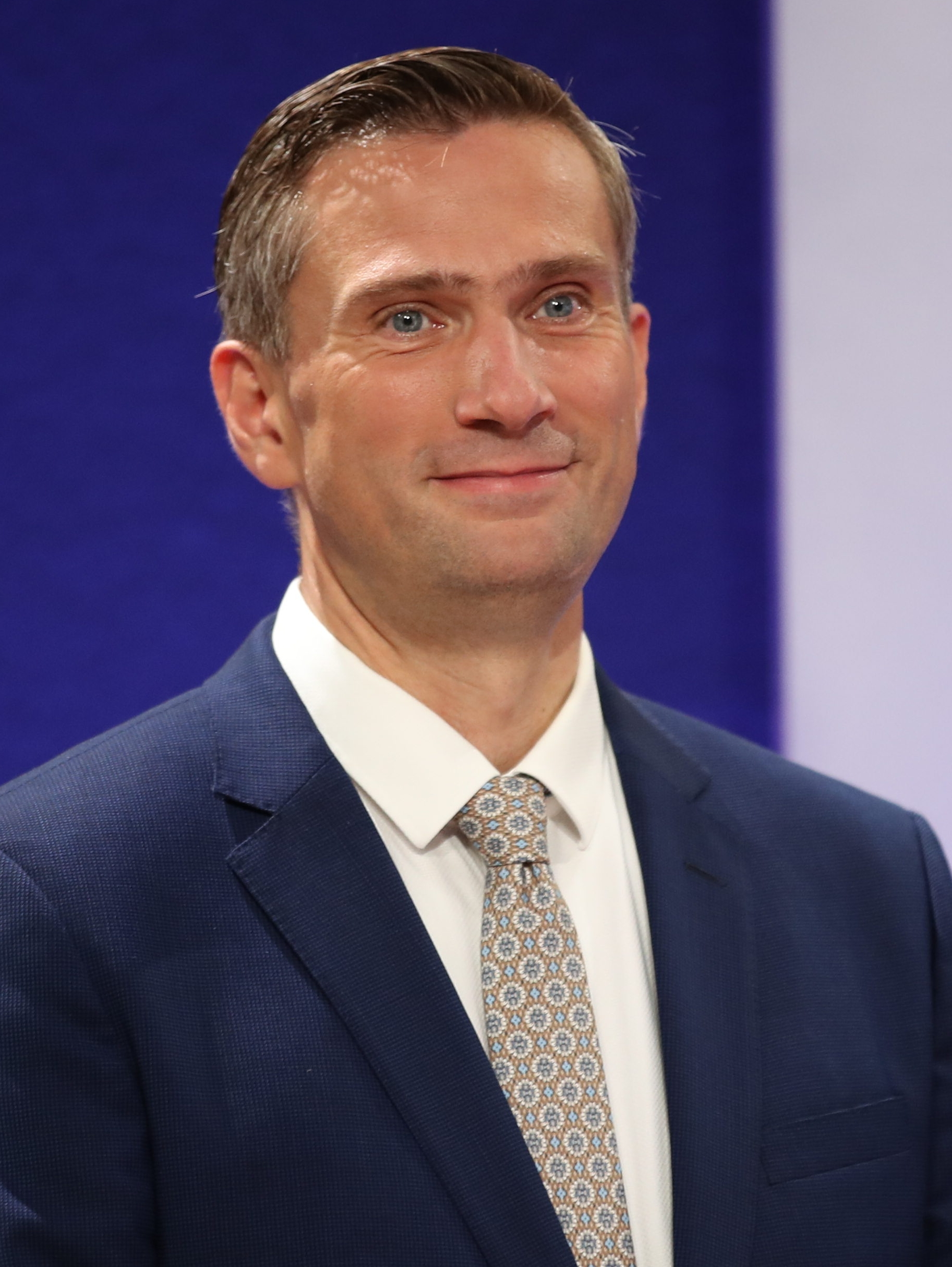
	First party	Second party	Third party
Leader	Michael Kretschmer	Jörg Urban	Rico Gebhardt
Party	CDU	AfD	Left
Last election	59 seats, 39.4%	14 seats, 9.7%	27 seats, 18.9%
Seats won	45	38	14
Seat change	▼14	▲24	▼13
Popular vote	695,560	595,671	224,354
Percentage	32.1%	27.5%	10.4%
Swing	▼7.3 pp	▲17.7 pp	▼8.5 pp
	Fourth party	Fifth party
Leader	Wolfram Günther & Katja Meier	Martin Dulig
Party	Greens	SPD
Last election	8 seats, 5.7%	18 seats, 12.4%
Seats won	12	10
Seat change	▲4	▼8
Popular vote	187,015	167,289
Percentage	8.6%	7.7%
Swing	▲2.9 pp	▼4.6 pp
- Results for the single-member constituencies
Government before election
Kretschmer I
CDU–SPD
Government after election
Kretschmer II
CDU–Greens–SPD

The 2019 Saxony state election was held on 1 September 2019 to elect the members of the 7th Landtag of Saxony. The outgoing government was a grand coalition of the Christian Democratic Union (CDU) and Social Democratic Party (SPD) led by Minister-President Michael Kretschmer.

The CDU, SPD, and The Left suffered heavy losses. The Alternative for Germany (AfD) moved into second place with 27.5% of votes, an increase of almost 18 percentage points. The Left fell from second to third place, underperforming opinion polls with 10%. The Greens recorded an improvement to 8.6%, but also fared more poorly than expected. The SPD fell to fifth place with 8%. The election saw a major increase in voter turnout, rising from less than half in 2014 to 66.5% in 2019.

The incumbent grand coalition lost its majority, necessitating the formation of a new government. The CDU subsequently negotiated a "Kenya coalition" with the Greens and SPD. Michael Kretschmer was re-elected as Minister-President on 20 December.

== Background ==
In the 2014 state election, the CDU entered into coalition with the SPD. Since then, Saxony emerged as a stronghold of the Alternative for Germany (AfD), which achieved its best results in Saxony in national elections since. It won narrow pluralities in the state in both the 2017 federal election, winning 27.0%, and the 2019 European elections, winning 25.3%.

In May 2019, the Saxon electoral commission ruled that two-thirds of AfD's candidate list was invalid due to the party's decision to split them across two lists. However, in July, a court partially overturned this decision, ruling half of the party's list eligible.

== Parties ==
The table below lists parties represented in the 6th Landtag of Saxony.

Name		Ideology	Leader(s)	2014 result	
Name		Ideology	Leader(s)	Votes (%)	Seats
CDU	Christian Democratic Union of Germany; Christlich Demokratische Union Deutschlands	Christian democracy	Michael Kretschmer	39.4%	59 / 126
Linke	The Left; Die Linke	Democratic socialism	Rico Gebhardt	18.9%	27 / 126
SPD	Social Democratic Party of Germany; Sozialdemokratische Partei Deutschlands	Social democracy	Martin Dulig	12.4%	18 / 126
AfD	Alternative for Germany; Alternative für Deutschland	German nationalism Right-wing populism	Jörg Urban	9.7%	14 / 126
Grüne	Alliance 90/The Greens; Bündnis 90/Die Grünen	Green politics	Katja Meier; Wolfram Günther	5.7%	8 / 126

== Opinion polling ==
=== Party polling ===
Polling firm	Fieldwork date	Sample size	CDU	Linke	SPD	AfD	Grüne	NPD	FDP	Others	Lead
2019 state election	1 Sep 2019	–	32.1	10.4	7.7	27.5	8.6	0.6	4.5	8.6	4.6
Forschungsgruppe Wahlen	26–29 Aug 2019	1,657	32	14	8.5	24.5	11	–	5	5	7.5
Civey	4–28 Aug 2019	5,015	29.0	15.0	8.9	24.9	10.9	–	5.7	5.6	4.1
INSA	19–26 Aug 2019	1,018	29	15	8	25	11	–	5	7	4
Forschungsgruppe Wahlen	19–22 Aug 2019	1,068	31	14	9	25	10	–	5	6	6
Infratest dimap	19–21 Aug 2019	1,002	30	16	7	24	11	–	5	7	6
Civey	23 Jul–20 Aug 2019	5,016	28.0	15.0	8.5	25.2	11.4	–	5.5	6.4	2.8
FB Czaplicki	8–15 Aug 2019	700	28.0	16.0	8.0	26.0	13.0	–	5.0	4.0	2
INSA	22–31 Jul 2019	1,011	28	16	8	25	12	–	5	6	3
Civey	27 Jun–25 Jul 2019	5,019	27.1	15.0	8.7	25.4	10.8	–	5.6	7.4	1.7
Infratest dimap	24–29 Jun 2019	1,000	26	15	9	26	12	–	5	7	Tie
Civey	15 May–12 Jun 2019	5,001	29.7	16.6	10.3	23.5	10.6	–	4.6	4.7	6.2
INSA	4–11 Jun 2019	1,057	24	16	7	25	16	–	6	6	1
FB Czaplicki	29 May–4 Jun 2019	703	24	15	8	24	14	–	6	9	Tie
2019 European election	26 May 2019	–	23.0	11.7	8.6	25.3	10.3	0.8	4.7	15.6	2.3
INSA	17–24 Apr 2019	1,000	28	16	10	26	9	–	6	5	2
Civey	19 Mar–16 Apr 2019	3,852	29.4	17.4	11.6	20.8	9.9	–	6.1	4.8	8.6
INSA	7–18 Mar 2019	1,028	28	17	9	25	9	–	6	6	3
FB Czaplicki	4–13 Mar 2019	703	27	17	11	18	16	–	5	6	9
INSA	10–17 Dec 2018	1,000	29	18	10	25	9	–	6	3	4
IM Field	2–14 Nov 2018	1,002	29	17	11	24	8	–	6	5	5
INSA	27–30 Aug 2018	1,040	28	18	11	25	7	–	7	4	3
uniQma	20–28 Aug 2018	703	28.9	18.6	11.4	23.9	6.8	–	5.6	4.5	5.0
Infratest dimap	20–25 Aug 2018	1,000	30	18	11	25	6	–	5	5	5
INSA	4–11 Jun 2018	1,009	32	19	9	24	6	–	6	4	8
IM Field	16 Nov–2 Dec 2017	1,000	33	18	12	23	4	–	7	3	10
IM Field	23–26 Oct 2017	1,005	31	17	14	21	4	–	7	5	10
2017 federal election	24 Sep 2017	–	26.9	16.1	10.5	27.0	4.6	1.1	8.2	5.6	0.2
Infratest dimap	12–17 Jun 2017	1,000	41	15	10	21	4	–	5	4	20
Infratest dimap	15–19 Nov 2016	1,002	34	16	12	25	7	–	–	6	9
INSA	19–23 Sep 2016	1,003	37.5	16	13	21.5	6	1.5	2	2.5	16
Infratest dimap	9–14 Sep 2015	1,001	38	17	13	13	7	5	3	4	21
2014 state election	31 Aug 2014	–	39.4	18.9	12.4	9.7	5.7	4.9	3.8	5.1	20.5

== Election result ==
Party	Constituency				Party list				Total seats	+/-	Seats %
Party	Votes	%	+/-	Seats	Votes	%	+/-	Seats	Total seats	+/-	Seats %
Christian Democratic Union (CDU)	703,006	32.5	▼7.2	41	695,560	32.1	▼7.3	4	45	▼14	37.8
Alternative for Germany (AfD)	613,585	28.4	▲22.0	15	595,671	27.5	▲17.7	23	38	▲24	31.9
The Left (Die Linke)	265,871	12.3	▼8.7	1	224,354	10.4	▼8.5	13	14	▼13	11.8
Alliance 90/The Greens (Grüne)	192,489	8.9	▲2.6	3	187,015	8.6	▲2.9	9	12	▲4	10.1
Social Democratic Party (SPD)	166,920	7.7	▼5.5	0	167,289	7.7	▼4.6	10	10	▼8	8.4
Free Democratic Party (FDP)	100,639	4.7	▲0.6	0	97,438	4.5	▲0.7	0	0	±0	0
Free Voters (FW)	98,353	4.6	▲2.6	0	72,897	3.4	▲1.8	0	0	±0	0
Die PARTEI (PARTEI)	12,557	0.6	▲0.4	0	33,618	1.6	▲0.9	0	0	±0	0
Human Environment Animal Protection Party (Tierschutz)	–	–	0.0	–	33,476	1.5	▲0.4	0	0	±0	0
National Democratic Party (NPD)	–	–	0.0	–	12,947	0.6	▼4.3	0	0	±0	0
Partei für Gesundheitsforschung	–	–	New	–	11,652	0.5	New	0	0	New	0
Blaue #TeamPetry Thüringen	1,508	0.1	New	0	7,806	0.4	New	0	0	New	0
Pirate Party Germany (Piraten)	–	–	▼1.6	–	6,632	0.3	▼0.8	0	0	±0	0
Ecological Democratic Party (ÖDP)	–	–		–	6,000	0.3	▲0.3	0	0	±0	0
Party of Humanists (Humanisten)	–	–	New	–	4,305	0.2	New	0	0	New	0
Dawn of German Patriots – Middle Germany (ADPM)	–	–	New	–	3,948	0.2	New	0	0	New	0
Party of Reason (PDV)	–	–		–	2,268	0.1	▲0.1	0	0	±0	0
Communist Party of Germany (KPD)	–	–		–	1,951	0.1	▲0.1	0	0	±0	0
Bürgerrechtsbewegung Solidarität (BüSo)	–	–	▼0.4	–	1,630	0.1	▼0.1	0	0	±0	0
Other	2,732	0.1		0	–	–	–	–	0	±0	0
Valid votes	2,159,850	98.7			2,166,457	99.0					
Blank and invalid votes	28,636	1.3			22,029	1.0					
Total	2,188,486	100.0		60	2,188,486	100.0		59	119	▼7	
Electorate/voter turnout	3,288,643	66.5	▲17.4		3,288,643	66.5	▲17.4				
Source: Statistisches Landesamt des Freistaates Sachsen

AfD received its highest share of the vote in any state or federal election, while the CDU and The Left both fell to record lows in Saxony. Under normal circumstances AfD should have received 39 seats in the Landtag; however, due to positions 31–61 being ruled invalid and removed from AfD's party list, they had no candidates to fill the final seat. Thus, it remains vacant and there are only 119 seats in the Landtag, one fewer than the standard minimum size.

== Government formation ==
Incumbent Minister-President Michael Kretschmer was considered likely to retain his job, as his party remained the largest in the Landtag. Kretschmer ruled out working with AfD or leading a minority government during the campaign. As the CDU also rejects working with The Left, this leaves a so-called "Kenya coalition" as the only viable option: a coalition of the CDU, Greens, and SPD. Such a coalition has governed Saxony-Anhalt since the 2016 state election. Kretschmer and Green leaders Meier and Günther publicly supported exploratory discussions in the week following the election, and the Greens scheduled a party vote on opening negotiations for 12 October.

On 20 December, the coalition between the CDU, Greens, and SPD was approved by the Landtag and sworn into government, with Kretschmer remaining as Minister-President.
