= Next Saxony state election =

Election in Germany

All 120 seats in the Landtag of Saxony 61 seats needed for a majority
| | First party | Second party | Third party |
|---|---|---|---|
| Party | CDU | AfD | BSW |
| Last election | 41 seats, 31.9% | 40 seats, 30.6% | 15 seats, 11.8% |
| | Fourth party | Fifth party | Sixth party |
| Party | SPD | Greens | Left |
| Last election | 10 seats, 7.3% | 7 seats, 5.1% | 6 seats, 4.5% |
| | Seventh party |
| Party | FW |
| Last election | 1 seat, 2.3% |
Government before election
Kretschmer III
CDU–SPD
Government after election
TBD

The next election to the Landtag of Saxony is scheduled for summer 2029, after a term of 5 years, unless the seven-parties-parliament with a minority government dissolves itself for a snap election.

== Electoral system ==
=== Election date ===
Coat of arms of the Saxon State Parliament

According to Article 44, paragraph 1, sentence 1 of the Constitution of the Free State of Saxony, the Landtag (state parliament) is elected for a five-year term. Section 16, paragraph 2, sentence 1 of the Saxon Electoral Law stipulates that election day must be no earlier than 58 months and no later than 60 months after the start of the legislative term. In the event of premature dissolution, the election must take place within 60 days. Unlike the Basic Law (Germany's constitution), the Saxon Constitution does not provide for a vote of confidence. Instead, the Saxon Landtag has the right to dissolve itself if two-thirds of the Landtag so decide. The last election took place on 1 September 2024.

=== Voters ===
The Landtag normally has 120 members. This number can increase due to overhang and leveling seats, as last occurred in 2014. Each voter has two votes: a direct vote and a party-list vote, corresponding to the first and second votes in the federal election system. In each of the 60 constituencies, one representative is elected to the state parliament by a relative majority of the direct votes. This includes candidates whose party receives less than 5% of the vote. Since 2024, the 120 seats have been allocated proportionally according to the Sainte-Laguë method, based on party-list votes, among the parties that either win at least 5% of the party-list votes statewide or at least two direct mandates (the so-called basic mandate clause). If a party wins fewer seats in constituencies than it is entitled to in total seats, the remaining seats are allocated to it via the state-wide party list in the order determined there. Its candidates elected in the constituencies are not considered in this allocation.

== Background ==
The 1 September 2024 Saxony state election, held the same day as the 2024 Thuringian state election in one of its neighbouring states, and three weeks before the 22 September 2024 Brandenburg state election in another, was won by the CDU with a narrow lead over the AfD which is subject to a firewall policy.

Only the CDU secured the blocking minority of 41 seats the AfD aimed for. Both parties received just over 30% of the votes, CDU 31.9%, AfD 30.6%, which translated to 40 AfD seats. The new BSW in its first-ever participation in a state election followed at a considerable distance, achieving 11.8% of the vote. All parties previously involved in the state government until 2024 — CDU, SPD, and Greens — recorded losses. The SPD achieved its worst result in Saxony with 7.3%. The Greens barely cleared the 5% election threshold with 5.1%.

All other parties failed to win at least 5%, but two managed to be represented anyway by winning constituencies. The Left lost more than half of its voters and entered the state parliament only through two direct mandates in Leipzig via the basic mandate clause that gave them a proportional number of seats, 6. The Free Voters (FW) and Free Saxons performed similarly with 2.3% and 2.2%, respectively, but a Free Voters candidate entered the 8th Saxon State Parliament thanks to winning the direct mandate of Leipzig Land 3. The FDP, then still part of the German government, landed at 0.9%, behind even the Animal Protection Party (1.0%), marking its worst result in any German state election to date. In addition to the parties mentioned, nine other lists competed in 2024.

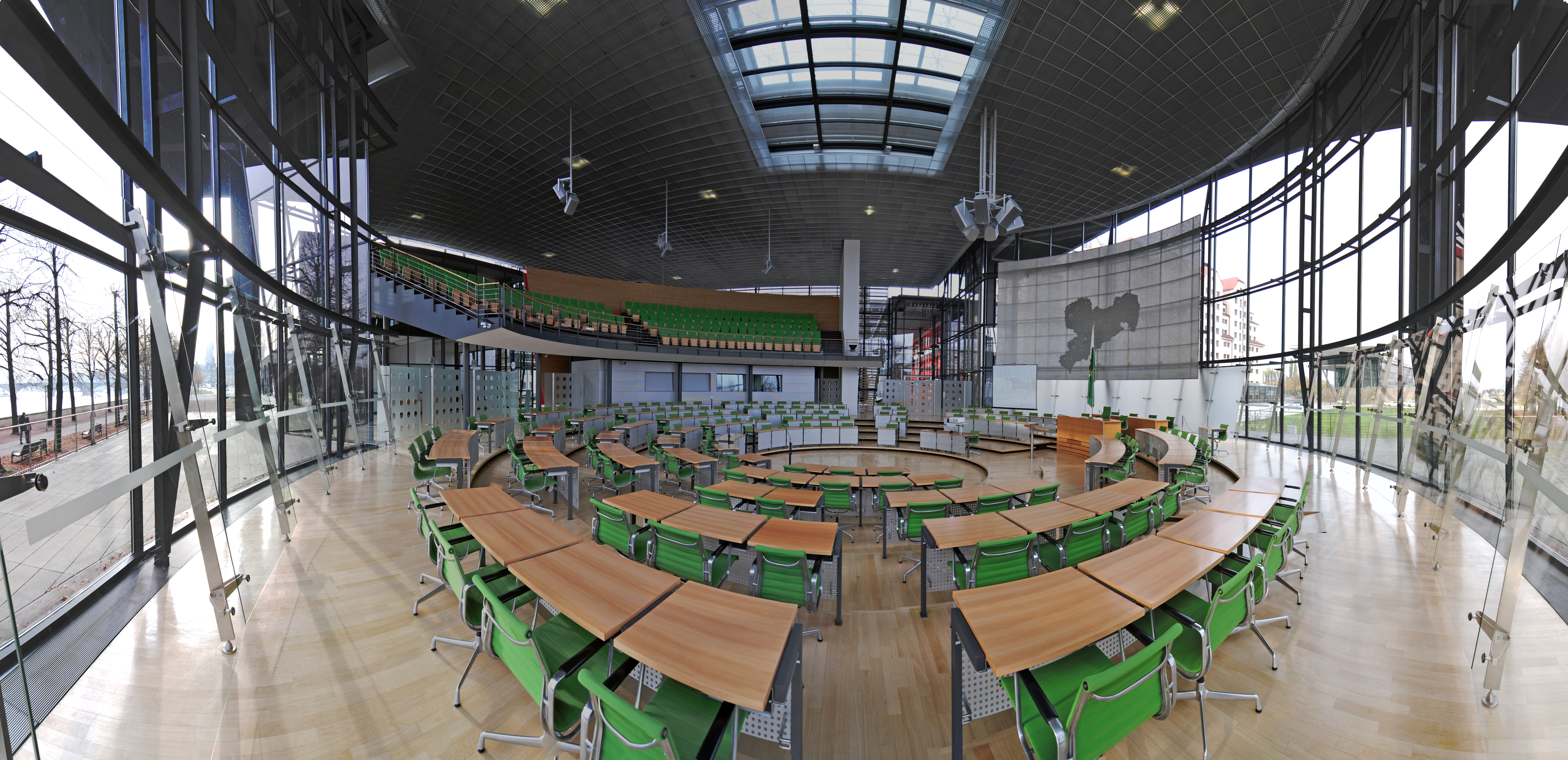
Plenary hall of Saxony.

Since the Minister-President election on 18 December 2024, Saxony has been governed by the Kretschmer III cabinet, a minority coalition of the CDU and SPD (51 out of 120 seats) without a fixed tolerance partner. With the AfD kept out considered due to the firewall, the government relies on case-by-case negotiations and a consultation mechanism with opposition parties (especially the BSW, Greens, and Left) to secure majorities.

| Party | Abbreviation | Seats 2024 |
|---|---|---|
| CDU Saxony | CDU | 41 |
| AfD Saxony | AfD | 40 |
| BSW Saxony | BSW | 15 |
| SPD Saxony | SPD | 10 |
| Alliance 90/The Greens Saxony | Bündnisgrüne | 7 |
| Die Linke Saxony | Die Linke | 6 |
| Free Voters of Saxony | FW | 1 |
| FDP Saxony | FDP | 0 |

In December 2025, Michael Kretschmer announced he would seek re-election in 2029. He said his grand coalition looked stable for a full term. In July 2026, he questioned Friedrich Merz for his firewall policy.

== Opinion polls ==
=== Party polling ===
| Polling firm | Fieldwork date | Sample size | CDU | AfD | BSW | SPD | Grüne | Linke | FW | FDP | Others | Lead |
|---|---|---|---|---|---|---|---|---|---|---|---|---|
| INSA | 3–10 Nov 2026 | 1,000 | 20 | 41 | 8 | 7 | 6 | 9 | – | – | 9 | 21 |
| INSA | 13–20 May 2026 | 1,000 | 21 | 42 | 7 | 6 | 6 | 9 | – | – | 9 | 21 |
| Civey | 21 Dec – 4 Jan 2026 | 2,500 | 29 | 35 | 8 | 6 | 6 | 10 | 2 | 1 | 3 | 6 |
| Civey | 3 Nov 2025 | ? | 28 | 34 | 9 | 6 | 5 | 10 | – | – | 8 | 6 |
| Civey | 21 Sep – 5 Oct 2025 | ? | 27 | 37 | 8 | 5 | 6 | 10 | – | – | 7 | 10 |
| Civey | 20 Jul – 4 Aug 2025 | 2,500 | 27 | 35 | 9 | 6 | 6 | 10 | 2 | 1 | 4 | 8 |
| Civey | 22 Jun – 6 Jul 2025 | 2,502 | 29 | 34 | 9 | 5 | 5 | 10 | 2 | 1 | 5 | 5 |
| INSA | 28 May – 4 Jun 2025 | 1,000 | 26 | 35 | 11 | 5 | 5 | 9 | – | – | 8 | 9 |
| 2025 federal election | 23 Feb 2025 | – | 19.7 | 37.3 | 9.0 | 8.5 | 6.5 | 11.3 | – | 3.2 | 4.4 | 14.6 |
| 2024 state election | 1 Sep 2024 | – | 31.9 | 30.6 | 11.8 | 7.3 | 5.1 | 4.5 | 2.3 | 0.9 | 11.8 | 1.3 |

== See also ==
- 2029 European Parliament election
- Next Brandenburg state election
- Next Thuringian state election
