= Doreen Voigt =

German politician

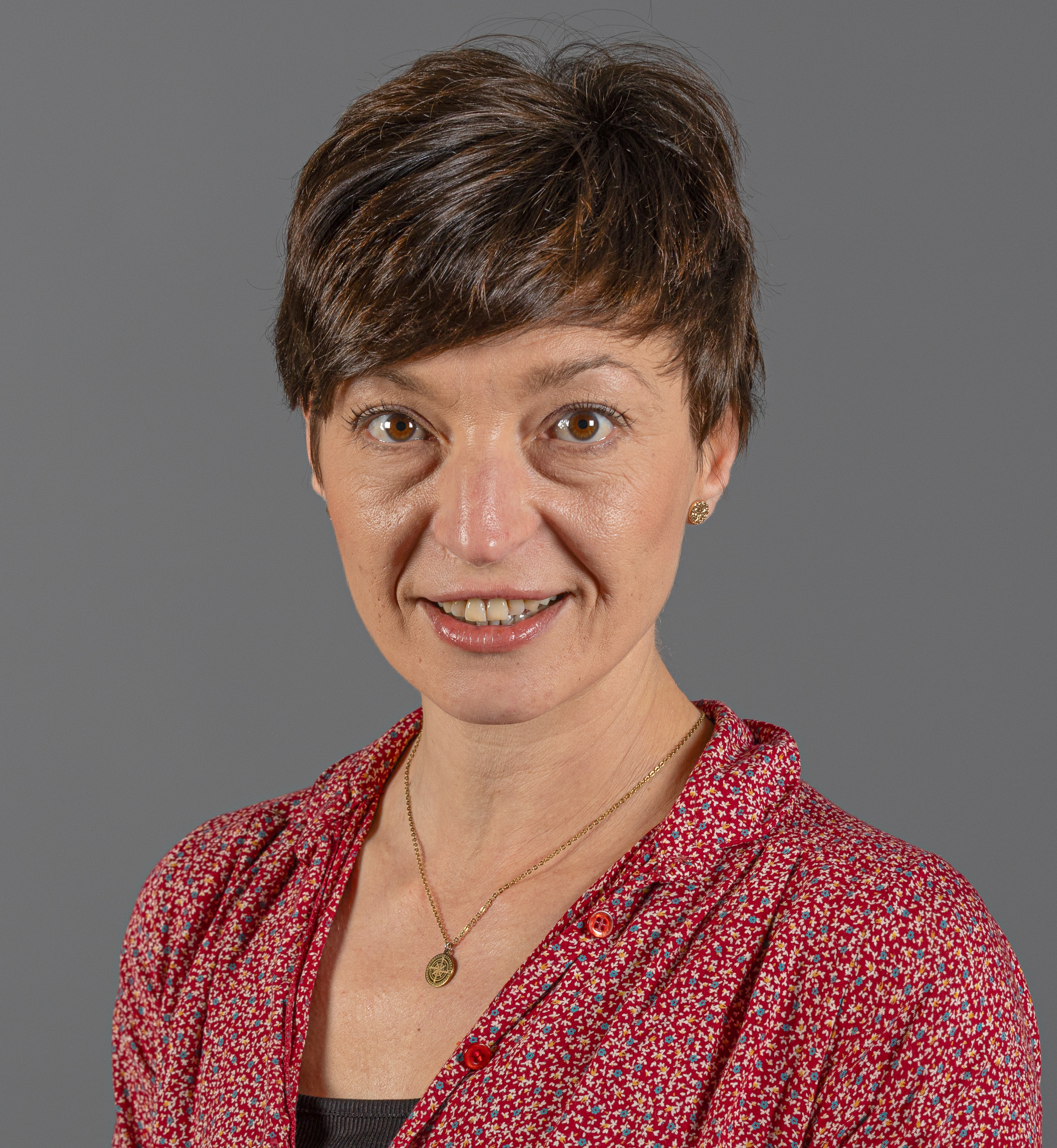
- Voigt in 2025

Member of the Landtag of Saxony
- Incumbent
- Assumed office 2024

Personal details
- Born: 1984 (age 41–42) Grimma, East Germany (now Germany)
- Party: Independent
- Other political affiliations: Sahra Wagenknecht Alliance (until 2026)

Doreen Voigt (born 1984) is a German politician. She has been a member of the Landtag of Saxony since 2024.

== Biography ==
Voigt worked as a social worker at the Paritätische Wohlfahrtsverband Sachsen (German Parity Welfare Association of Saxony) in the department for addiction and social psychiatry.

== Political career ==
Doreen Voigt joined the Sahra Wagenknecht Alliance (BSW) in 2024 and was placed third on the BSW state list in the 2024 Saxony state election, thus becoming a member of the 8th Landtag of Saxony.

In September 2026, she left the party, citing, among other reasons, a claimed lack of distancing from Alternative for Germany (AfD). Both BSW Saxony parliamentary group chairman Ronny Kupke and former BSW Saxony leader Sabine Zimmermann called on her to resign her seat.
