= INSA (Germany) =

German market research institute

Logo of INSA-CONSULERE

INSA or Institut für neue soziale Antworten (Institute for New Social Answers) is a German institute from Erfurt that offers psephological, political and market research. It is run by the company INSA-CONSULERE GmbH. In addition to its headquarter in Erfurt, the company has an office in Berlin, a service office in Brussels and a daughter company in Innsbruck, INSA-Austria.

== Polls ==
INSA publishes the INSA Meinungstrend (INSA opinion trend) poll on every weekend for German federal elections on behalf of the Bild tabloid. INSA works also for other clients, e.g. for state elections, such as Cicero and Focus magazine, Freie Presse, Leipziger Volkszeitung, Neue Zürcher Zeitung, Nordkurier, Superillu, and local newspapers of Thuringia, like Thüringische Landeszeitung, Thüringer Allgemeine and Ostthüringer Zeitung In addition, INSA cooperated with YouGov for some polls. INSA Meinungstrend was also cited as Insa YouGov Meinungstrend.

== History ==
The INSA institute was founded in 2009 by former CDU politician and Thuringian State Secretary Hermann Binkert. Since 2011 he is CEO of the INSA Consulere company. In 2017 INSA was awarded as a Top-Innovator of the German Mittelstand by Ranga Yogeshwar. The company has a Brussels representative and a service office in the de facto capital of the European Union. Since 2022 INSA has a 100% subsidiary with INSA-Austria in Innsbruck.

== Political role and critique ==
According to Binkert, his opinion research institute receives orders from all parties in the German Bundestag and state parliaments. Binkert was criticised for having contacts to the AfD party. He was shareholder of a company that was consulting the AfD. Guests from different parties are invited to regular events and lectures at the INSA-Haus in Erfurt.
