= Jörg Scheibe =

German politician (born 1962)

- Jörg Scheibe in 2025

Member of the Landtag of Saxony
- Incumbent
- Assumed office 2024

Personal details
- Born: 19 July 1962 (age 64) Chemnitz
- Party: Sahra Wagenknecht Alliance (since 2024)

Jörg Scheibe (born 19 July 1962) is a German politician (BSW, SED). He has been a member of the Landtag of Saxony since 2024, where he was elected as its third vice president. Scheibe, together with Ronny Kupke, is one of the two state chairmen of the BSW Saxony.

== Biography ==
Scheibe heads a company that plans air conditioning, plumbing, and heating systems for large construction projects. He also heads the Versorgungs and Umwelttechnik program at the Glauchau State Academy of Higher Education.

In 1988, Scheibe became a member of the Socialist Unity Party of Germany (SED). After the fall of the Berlin Wall and the peaceful revolution in East Germany, he left the SED and was no longer politically active. In 2024, he joined the newly founded Sahra Wagenknecht Alliance (BSW). He cited "general dissatisfaction with current politics" as the reason for his return to politics. At the founding meeting of the Saxon state association of the BSW on 24 February 2024, he was elected state chairman together with Sabine Zimmermann. Since September 2025, he has led the state association jointly with Ronny Kupke. In the 2024 Saxony state election, Scheibe was elected to the Landtag of Saxony as the BSW's lead candidate . He subsequently ran for chairman of the BSW parliamentary group but lost to Sabine Zimmermann. On 1 October 2024, Scheibe was elected in the second round of voting as one of the four vice presidents of the Landtag of Saxony.

Scheibe advocates for a long-term transition to CO2-free renewable energies , but sees natural gas as a transitional energy resource. Despite the Russo-Ukrainian war, he argued for importing oil and natural gas to Germany directly from Russia.
