= TLZ =

TLZ may stand for:

- Thüringische Landeszeitung, a German newspaper
- Trierische Landeszeitung, a German newspaper
- The file extension for tar files compressed with LZMA or lzip.
