= Leipzig 1 =

State electoral district of Germany

25: Leipzig 1
- Electoral district for the Landtag of Saxony
- Leipzig 1 in 2024
- District: Leipzig
- Electorate: 59,218 (2024)
- Major settlements: Leipzig-Mitte excluding the suburbs of Zentrum-Nordwest and Zentrum-Nord, Neustadt-Neuschönefeld (Ost), and Reudnitz-Thonberg (Südost)

Current electoral district
- Party: De Linke
- Member: Nam Duy Nguyen

Leipzig 1 is an electoral constituency (German: Wahlkreis) represented in the Landtag of Saxony. It elects one member via first-past-the-post voting. Under the constituency numbering system, it is designated as constituency 25. It is within the city of Leipzig.

== Geography ==
The constituency comprises the districts of Leipzig-Mitte excluding the suburbs of Zentrum-Nordwest and Zentrum-Nord, the sub-district of Neustadt-Neuschönefeld (city district Ost), and the sub-district of Reudnitz-Thonberg (city district Südost) within the City of Leipzig.

There were 59,218 eligible voters in 2024.

== Members ==
Election	Member	Party	%
2014	Ronald Pohle	CDU	35.6
2019	Ronald Pohle	CDU	31.1
2024	Nam Duy Nguyen	De Linke	39.8

== Election results ==
=== 2024 election ===
State election (2024): Leipzig 1
Notes:	Blue background denotes the winner of the electorate vote. Pink background denotes a candidate elected from their party list. Yellow background denotes an electorate win by a list member, or other incumbent. A ✓ or ✗ denotes status of any incumbent, win or lose respectively.						
Party	Candidate	Votes	%	±%	Party votes	%	±%
Left	Nam Duy Nguyen	18,046	39.8	▲17.7	9,208	20.2	▲1.1
CDU	Cornelia Blattner	8,350	18.4	▲0.2	9,742	21.4	▲1.6
Greens	Christin Melcher	5,798	12.8	▼15.9	8,788	19.3	▼7.9
AfD	Jörg Kühne	4,876	10.8	▲0.6	4,589	10.1	Steady
SPD	Dirk Panter	3,574	7.9	▼2.3	6,187	13.6	▲3.3
BSW	Eric Recke	3,027	6.7		3,920	8.6	
PARTEI					733	1.6	▼1.9
FDP	Nicolas Brendel	934	2.1	▼2.0	644	1.4	▼2.9
FW	Tobias Volte	732	1.6	▼0.9	445	1.0	▼0.6
APT					383	0.8	
Freie Sachsen					195	0.3	
Pirates					176	0.4	
V-Partei3					123	0.3	
dieBasis					90	0.2	
BD					82	0.2	
Values					64	0.1	
ÖDP					53	0.1	
Bündnis C					37	0.1	
BüSo					20	0.0	
Informal votes		336			194		
Total valid votes		45,337			45,479		
Turnout		45,673	77.1	▲16.2			
Left gain from CDU	Majority	9,696	21.4				

=== 2019 election ===
State election (2019): Leipzig 1
Notes:	Blue background denotes the winner of the electorate vote. Pink background denotes a candidate elected from their party list. Yellow background denotes an electorate win by a list member, or other incumbent. A ✓ or ✗ denotes status of any incumbent, win or lose respectively.						
Party	Candidate	Votes	%	±%	Party votes	%	±%
CDU	✓ Ronald Pohle	12,481	31.1	▼4.5	11,835	29.4	▼5.7
AfD	Kerstin Penndorf	8,760	21.8	▲14.6	8,537	21.2	▲13.1
Greens	Andrea Fehse-Klinke	5,996	14.9	▲8.1	5,289	13.2	▲5.7
Left	Angela Fuchs	5,348	13.3	▼9.2	4,997	12.4	▼8.6
SPD	Arnold Arpaci	3,877	9.7	▼7.8	3,864	9.6	▼5.9
FW	Ralf Winkler	1,885	4.7	▲3.1	1,082	2.7	▲1.7
FDP	Michael Gehrhardt	1,768	4.4	▲1.3	1,687	4.2	▲0.8
PARTEI					982	2.4	▲1.5
APT					768	1.9	▲0.5
Verjüngungsforschung					250	0.6	
ÖDP					169	0.4	
Pirates					161	0.4	▼1.0
NPD					141	0.4	▼3.8
The Blue Party					116	0.3	
Humanists					114	0.3	
Awakening of German Patriots - Central Germany					76	0.2	
DKP					58	0.1	
PDV					50	0.1	
BüSo					23	0.1	▼0.1
Informal votes		451			367		
Total valid votes		40,115			40,199		
Turnout		40,566	62.8	▲19.3			
CDU	✓ Ronald Pohle	3,721	9.3	▼3.8			

=== 2014 election ===
State election (2014): Leipzig 1
Notes:	Blue background denotes the winner of the electorate vote. Pink background denotes a candidate elected from their party list. Yellow background denotes an electorate win by a list member, or other incumbent. A ✓ or ✗ denotes status of any incumbent, win or lose respectively.						
Party	Candidate	Votes	%	±%	Party votes	%	±%
CDU	Ronald Pohle	9,520	35.6		9,409	35.1	
Left		6,018	22.5		5,635	21.0	
SPD		4,681	17.5		4,155	15.5	
AfD		1,933	7.2		2,166	8.1	
Greens		1,825	6.8		2,004	7.5	
NPD		1,003	3.8		1,138	4.2	
FDP		828	3.1		905	3.4	
APT					373	1.4	
FW		424	1.6		274	1.0	
Pirates		414	1.5		366	1.4	
PARTEI					229	0.9	
BüSo		94	0.4		58	0.2	
Pro Germany Citizens' Movement					46	0.2	
DSU					36	0.1	
Informal votes		313			259		
Total valid votes		26,740			26,794		
Turnout		27,053	43.5	▼10.0			
CDU win new seat	Majority	3,502	13.1				

== See also ==
- Politics of Saxony
- Landtag of Saxony
