= Timeline of Erfurt =

The following is a timeline of the history of the city of Erfurt, Germany.

== Prior to 19th century ==
- 741 - Roman Catholic Diocese of Erfurt established.
- 755 - Catholic diocese absorbed into that of Mainz.
- 805 - Market rights granted by Charlemagne.
- 932 - Religious Synod of Erfurt held.
- 1060 - Benedictine Peterskloster (monastery) first recorded mention.
- 1094 - Old Synagogue construction begins
- 1109 - Landgrave of Thuringia in power.
- 1255 - Municipal rights granted by bishop Gerhard I. von Dhaun.
- 1277 - Building of St. Augustine's Monastery begun.
- 1290 - Rebuilt St. Mary's Cathedral consecrated.
- 1325 - Stone Merchant's Bridge built.
- 1349 - 21 March: Pogrom against Jews.
- 1392 - University of Erfurt opens.
- 1472 - Fire.
- 1480 - Building of Cyriaksburg Citadel begun.
- 1483 - Saxons in power per Treaty of Amorbach.
- 1494 - Printing press in operation.
- 1521 - Protestant reformation.
- 1664 - Erfurt becomes part of the Electorate of Mainz.
- 1665 - Foundation stone for Petersberg Citadel laid on 1 June 1665.
- 1754 - Akademie gemeinnütziger Wissenschaften zu Erfurt (learned society) formed.

== 19th century ==
- 1802 - Erfurt becomes part of Prussia.
- 1806 - 16 October: Prussian forces capitulate to French at Erfurt during the War of the Fourth Coalition.
- 1807 - Principality of Erfurt of the French Empire established.
- 1808 - International Congress of Erfurt held in the Kaisersaal and other venues from 27 September to 14 October 1808 .
- 1816 - University of Erfurt closes.
- 1840 - Kleine Synagoge (Erfurt) (synagogue) built.
- 1847 - Erfurt Hauptbahnhof (train station) opens.
- 1850 - Erfurt Union of German states created.
- 1862 - Königlich Preußische Gewehrfabrik Erfurt (manufactory) established.
- 1863 - Verein für die Geschichte und Altertumskunde von Erfurt (history society) founded.
- 1865 - Stadtarchiv Erfurt (city archives) established.
- 1869 - Nordhausen–Erfurt railway begins operating.
- 1875 - Rathaus (Erfurt) (town hall) built.
- 1878 - Topf and Sons founded as an engineering firm. It later made crematoria for Nazi concentration camps.
- 1878 - the Andreasstrasse Prison opened.
- 1880 - Population: 53,254.
- 1884 - Große Synagoge (Erfurt) (synagogue) built.
- 1889 - Martin Luther monument (Erfurt) erected on the Anger.
- 1891 - Meeting of the Social Democratic Party of Germany held in city; "Erfurt Program" adopted.
- 1895 - Population: 78,174.

== 20th century ==
- 1909 - Gutenbergschule (school) opens.
- 1911 - Ilversgehofen becomes part of Erfurt.^{(de)}
- 1919 - Population: 129,646.
- 1937 - Population: 152,651.^{(de)}
- 1938 - Hochheim and Melchendorf become part of Erfurt.^{(de)}
- 1940 - Bombing of Erfurt in World War II started.
- 1945
  - April: United States forces take city.
  - July: City becomes part of the Soviet Occupation zone of Germany.
- 1949 - City becomes part of the German Democratic Republic.
- 1945 - Thüringische Landeszeitung (newspaper) begins publication.
- 1950
  - Bindersleben, Bischleben-Stedten, Dittelstedt, Gispersleben, Marbach, Möbisburg-Rhoda, and Schmira become part of Erfurt.^{(de)}
  - City becomes capital of the Kreis Erfurt-Land (district).
- 1952 - Neue Synagoge (Erfurt) (synagogue) built.
- 1958 - Thüringer Zoopark Erfurt founded.
- 1960 - Heimattreue Erfurter association of Erfurters who moved to West Germany founded.
- 1971 - Population: 198,265.^{(de)}
- 1974 - Stadtmuseum Erfurt opens in the Haus zum Stockfisch.
- 1989 - Demonstrations against the GDR government, and citizens' occupation of the Stasi district headquarters and Stasi prison in Andreasstrasse.
- 1990
  - City becomes capital of state of Thuringia in the reunited nation of Germany.
  - Manfred Ruge becomes mayor.
  - Thüringer Allgemeine newspaper in publication.
- 1993 - University of Erfurt reestablished.
- 1994
  - Alach, Azmannsdorf, Büßleben, Egstedt, Ermstedt, Frienstedt, Gottstedt, Hochstedt, Kerspleben, Kühnhausen, Linderbach, Mittelhausen, Molsdorf, Niedernissa, Rohda, Salomonsborn, Schaderode, Schwerborn, Stotternheim, Tiefthal, Töttelstädt, Töttleben, Urbich, Vieselbach, Wallichen, Waltersleben, and Windischholzhausen become part of Erfurt.^{(de)}
  - Roman Catholic Diocese of Erfurt reestablished.
- 1995 - Naturkundemuseum Erfurt (museum) built.
- 1997 - Erfurt Stadtbahn (tram) begins operating.

== 21st century ==
- 2001 - April: Topf and Sons squat begins.
- 2002 - 26 April: Erfurt school massacre occurs.
- 2006 - Andreas Bausewein becomes mayor.
- 2007 - Erfurter Bahn (railway) begins operating.
- 2010 - Population: 204,994.^{(de)}

== See also ==
- History of Erfurt
- List of mayors of Erfurt (1817–present; in German)
- History of the Jews in Erfurt
- List of heritage sites in Erfurt
- Thuringia history (state)

== Bibliography ==
=== in English ===
- "Erfurt". Handbook for North Germany. Murray's hand-book Rhine & North Germany (20th ed.). London: J. Murray. 1886. hdl:2027/hvd.hn1imr.
- "Erfurt". Chambers's Encyclopaedia. London. 1901. hdl:2027/njp.32101065312892.
- "Erfurt", Jewish Encyclopedia, vol. 5, New York, 1903, hdl:2027/mdp.49015002282276
- "Erfurt", Northern Germany (15th ed.), Leipzig: Karl Baedeker, 1910, OCLC 78390379 – via Internet Archive
- "Erfurt" . Encyclopædia Britannica. Vol. 9 (11th ed.). 1910. pp. 736–737.
- Levi, Anthony (1995). "Erfurt". In Trudy Ring (ed.). Northern Europe. International Dictionary of Historic Places. Fitzroy Dearborn. pp. 267–271. ISBN 978-1-136-63944-9.
- John M. Jeep, ed. (2001). "Erfurt". Medieval Germany: An Encyclopedia. Garland. pp. 208–210. ISBN 978-0-8240-7644-3.

=== in German ===
- "Erfurt". Biblioteca geographica: Verzeichniss der seit der Mitte des vorigen Jahrhunderts bis zu Ende des Jahres 1856 in Deutschland (in German). Leipzig: Wilhelm Engelmann. 1858. (bibliography)
- "Erfurt". Neuestes Reisehandbuch für Thüringen. Meyers Reisebücher (in German). Hildburghausen: Bibliographisches Institut. 1864. hdl:2027/njp.32101030685257.
- Erfurt in seiner Vergangenheit und Gegenwart: historisch-topographischer Führer durch die Stadt (in German). Carl Villaret. 1868.
- "Erfurt". Brockhaus' Konversations-Lexikon (in German) (14th ed.). Leipzig: Brockhaus. 1896. hdl:2027/njp.32101064064478.
- P. Krauss und E. Uetrecht, ed. (1913). "Erfurt". Meyers Deutscher Städteatlas [Meyer's Atlas of German Cities] (in German). Leipzig: Bibliographisches Institut.
- Benary, Friedrich (1919). Zur Geschichte der Stadt und der Universität Erfurt am Ausgang des Mittelalters (in German). Gotha.
- Thüringen. Griebens Reiseführer (in German). 1919.
- Dehio, Georg (2003). Thüringen. Handbuch der Deutschen Kunstdenkmäler (in German). Munich. ISBN 3-422-03095-6.
- Geschichte der Stadt Erfurt (in German). Weimar. 1986.
- Friedhilde Krause; Felicitas Marwinski, eds. (1998). "Erfurt". Thüringen (in German). Georg Olms Verlag. pp. 176–221. ISBN 9783487418148.
- Köbler, Gerhard (2007). "Erfurt". Historisches Lexikon der Deutschen Länder (in German) (7th ed.). Munich: C.H. Beck. p. 171. ISBN 978-3-406-54986-1.
- Raßloff, Steffen (2012). Geschichte der Stadt Erfurt (in German). Erfurt: Sutton Verlag. ISBN 978-3-95400-044-9.
- Stade, Heinz, et al. (2015) Erfurt: eine Stadt im Wandel, Leipzig: Edition Leipzig. ISBN 978-3361007130
