= Werner Lang =

German automotive engineer

- Born: 23 March 1922
- Died: 17 June 2013; Zwickau
- Occupations: Engineer, mechanical engineer

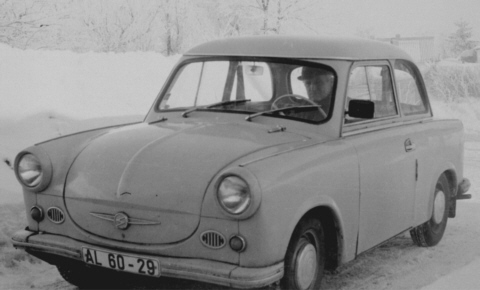
Trabant P50 built in 1959.

Richard Werner Lang (23 March 1922 – 17 June 2013) was a German automotive engineer. He is best known for the design of the Trabant.

Lang was born in the village of Bermsgrün, Saxony. After completing an apprenticeship, he studied for an engineering degree at what is now the West Saxon University of Applied Sciences of Zwickau in 1940. Lang's studies were interrupted by service in the Wehrmacht in the Second World War.

In 1944, Lang deserted from the Germany army and took up arms against Fascist forces in Italy.

After the war, he returned to what became East Germany. Lang was appointed chief designer of VEB Sachsenring Automobilwerke Zwickau in 1958.

Lang was awarded the National Prize of East Germany in 1954 and 1974.
