= Martin Kohlmann =

German politician and lawyer (born 1977)

Karl Martin Kohlmann
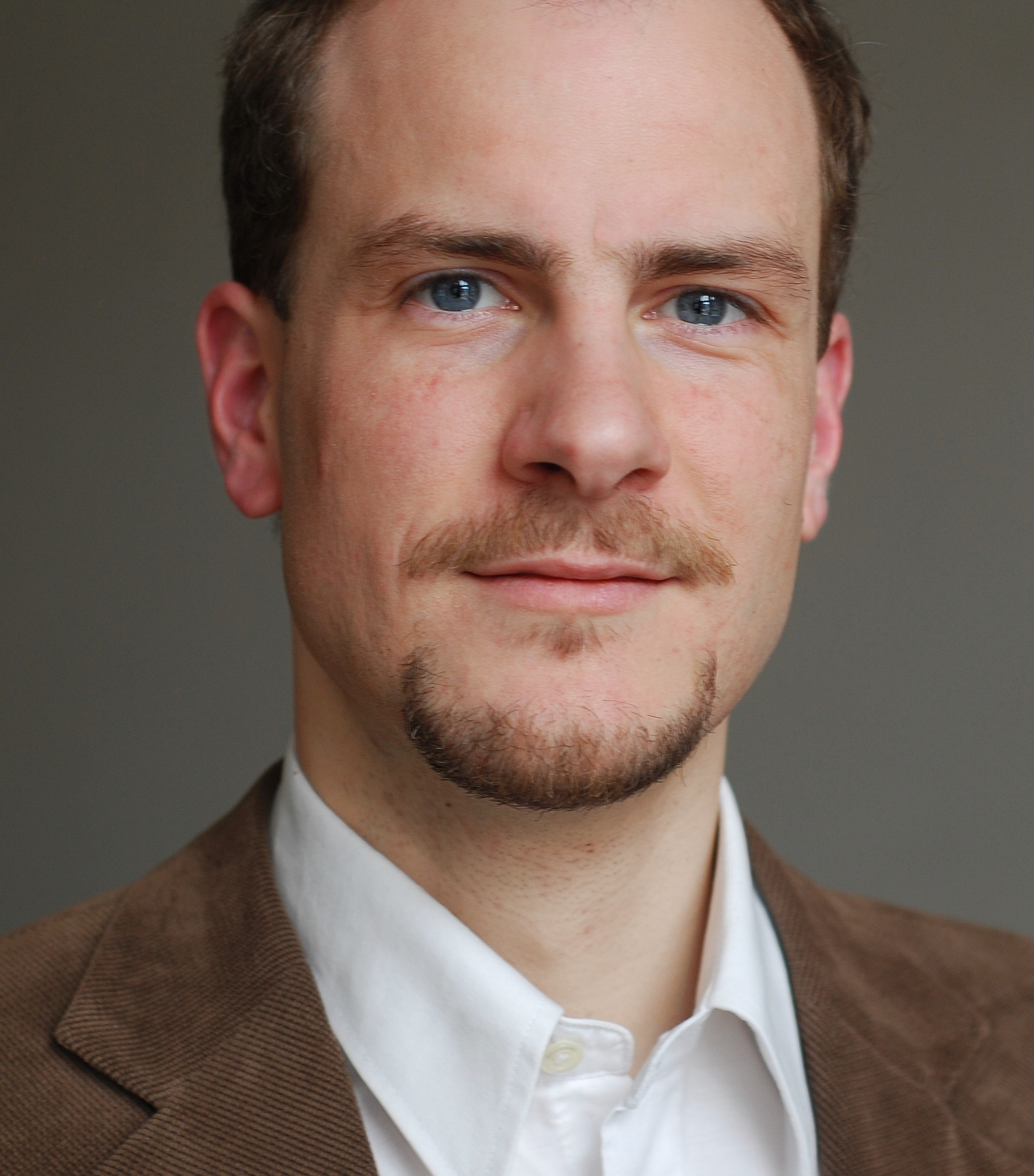

Leader of Freie Sachsen
- Incumbent
- Assumed office February 2021
- Preceded by: Office established

Personal details
- Born: 18 July 1977 (age 48) Karl-Marx-Stadt, East Germany
- Party: Free Saxons (2021–present); German Social Union (2006–2009); The Republicans (–2006)
- Other political affiliations: Pro Chemnitz (2009–present)
- Children: 3

Karl Martin Kohlmann (born 18 July 1977) is a German politician and lawyer. He is the founding chairman of the Free Saxons and was a member of Citizens' Movement Pro Chemnitz, the German Social Union and The Republicans.

He is being monitored by the Saxony State Office for the Protection of the Constitution, which recognises him as a "long-standing activist in the right-wing extremist scene". Kohlmann maintained relationships with the National Socialists Chemnitz among others. At the end of 2020, he gave the former neo-Nazi cadre Michael Brück a job in his law firm in Chemnitz. Kohlmann has stated he seeks the return of the Saxon Monarchy and the increased independence of the state of Saxony.

== Profession ==
After his military service in the German army from 1996 to 1998, Kohlmann studied law in Leipzig and Basel. He completed part of his legal traineeship in the Russian city of Krasnojarsk.

Kohlmann works as a self-employed lawyer. In 2010, he represented Bernd-Rüdiger Kern, a professor at the University of Leipzig, in court. The case concerned a dispute in a law lecture at a first-semester information event with Kern in the fraternity house of the Burschenschaft Arminia zu Leipzig. Kohlmann's clients also included convicted Holocaust denier Günter Deckert, chairman of the NPD from 1991 to 1996. In mid-October 2017, he was named by the Reichsbürger movement supporter Adrian Ursache as the third criminal defence attorney alongside the two public defenders in the ongoing trial.

As a defence attorney for the right-wing extremist Gruppe Freital, he disrupted the verdict. After informing the court, the Saxony Bar Association initiated proceedings against Kohlmann and examined his conduct in this regard from a professional perspective. The Association of Criminal Defence Lawyers Saxony/Saxony-Anhalt then expelled him from the association.

One of Kohlmann's legal focuses is the legal representation of rejected asylum seekers, especially from the former Soviet Union. The Georgian chairman of the cultural association "Tolstoi e. V." introduced numerous asylum seekers to Kohlmann as clients due to his knowledge of Russian. The television magazine Report Mainz described it as a "contradiction" that Kohlmann, on the one hand, as a Chemnitz city councillor, demands the immediate deportation of asylum seekers whose applications have been legally rejected, but on the other hand advocates for their right to remain in court.

== Social commitment and private life ==
In 2014, Kohlmann was co-founder and initially secretary of the cultural association "Tolstoi e. V." which was initially based in his law firm and whose "aim is to promote the idea of international understanding as well as the social and cultural support of refugees, emigrants, late emigrants and national minorities." The services also include "legal advice for migrants". Until 2016, the association listed him as head of the legal department in the association's magazine "Berliner Telegraph", in which Kohlmann places advertisements. Alexander Boyko, founder and editor-in-chief of the Berliner Telegraph, has been in close contact with Kohlmann since 2014. According to Report Mainz, Boyko has specifically recruited asylum seekers in the vicinity of refugee camps as clients for Kohlmann as "the only Russian-speaking lawyer for asylum law in Chemnitz."

Kohlmann was born in Chemnitz and lives there to this day. He is married and has three children. He is a member of the Burschenschaft Arminia zu Leipzig fraternity.

== Convictions ==
On 9 October 2020, the Verden District Court sentenced him to a fine of 2,100 euros for incitement to hatred. Kohlmann initially appealed.

On 8 November 2022, Kohlmann was sentenced by the Chemnitz District Court to a fine of 120 daily rates of 50 euros each for incitement to hatred. The verdict initially did not become final.

On 12 April 2023, it was announced that the Chemnitz public prosecutor's office had applied for a penalty order of 7,500 euros against Kohlmann for withholding and embezzling wages because Kohlmann was alleged to have paid two employees a wage below the minimum wage for three years.

== Political career ==
=== The Republicans ===
Kohlmann was first elected to the city council of Chemnitz in 1999. In 2000, he accused the then mayor of Chemnitz, Peter Seifert (SPD), in a city council meeting of having "trivialized" an air raid on Chemnitz during World War II. Seifert then insulted Kohlmann, for which Seifert was later ordered to pay Kohlmann compensation. Kohlmann was a candidate in the 2004 European Parliament election on the third place list of The Republicans. In early 2004, he organized a concert with the right-wing extremist musician Frank Rennicke in Chemnitz. After the resignation of the state chairwoman Kerstin Lorenz, Kohlmann was elected state chairman of the Republicans in Saxony on 24 July 2004. In this role, he rejected cooperation between the Republicans and the NPD. In 2006, the current state chairman Mario Heinz left the party and the city councillor Peter Grüning left the Chemnitz faction and the party. Mario Heinz accused the faction chairman Kohlmann of being a "right-wing political clown".

=== German Social Union ===
In March 2006, Kohlmann switched to the German Social Union (DSU) and wanted to run for them in the mayoral election. However, the candidacy was not approved because Kohlmann did not provide the necessary supporting signatures. The non-admission of the nomination was ultimately confirmed by the Saxon Higher Administrative Court. The legal action taken by Kohlmann against the 2006 mayoral election in Chemnitz meant that the elected mayor's inauguration was delayed by a year, but he acted as acting mayor during this time. In 2008, Kohlmann ran as a DSU candidate for the office of district administrator in the Erzgebirgskreis and received 1.2% of the vote.

=== Citizens' Movement Pro Chemnitz ===
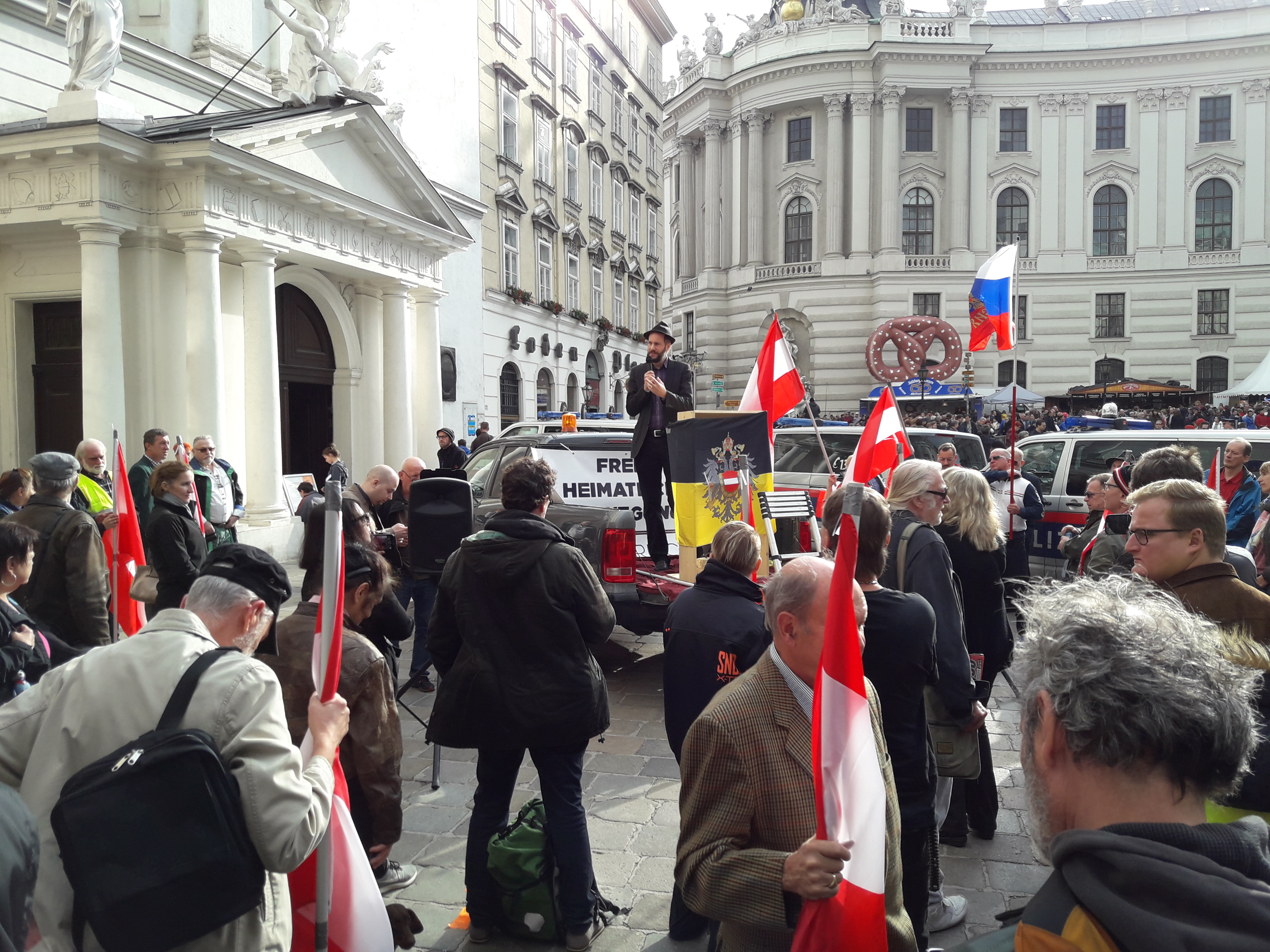
During a demonstration for the Austrian National Day on Michaelerplatz in Vienna. Martin Kohlmann from the Pro-Chemnitz movement speaks to a crowd standing next to the Flag of the Habsburg monarchy (2018).

In 2009, Kohlmann founded the Citizens' Movement Pro Chemnitz together with Reinhold Breede, former CDU member and former president of the City Council of Chemnitz, which ran under the name Citizens' Movement Pro Chemnitz in the 2009 local elections. The voters' association achieved a result of 4.57 percent of the vote and thus elected three city councillors, including Kohlmann himself.

According to the DGB Region Southwest Saxony, Kohlmann is sympathetic to the NPD Party as in 2010 Kohlmann gave up a competing rally in favour of them. In addition, in 2009 he carried a banner together with representatives of the neo-Nazi Erzgebirge Action Alliance at a demonstration he had registered.

At the end of April 2009, during a city council meeting, Kohlmann called Mayor Berthold Brehm (CDU), who had had removed from a school mural, a "cultural Taliban" and an "iconoclast". He responded to the Left Party's parliamentary group leader Hubert Gintschel with the words "You're the Nazi!" after Gintschel had previously associated Kohlmann with National Socialism.

As a result, Kohlmann was finally expelled from the hall by Mayor Barbara Ludwig (SPD). Kohlmann refused to leave and was carried out of the hall by the police. He was subsequently sentenced by the Chemnitz District Court to a fine of 2,275 euros for trespassing, but acquitted of the charges of insulting Brehm and Gintschel.

Kohlmann is chairman of the Pro-Chemnitz faction in the Chemnitz city council. He is also a member of various committees of the Chemnitz city council: the planning, construction and environment committee and the administration and finance committee as a member, and the petitions committee, the social committee and the school committee as a deputy member. In addition, he is a deputy member of the association council of the Sparkassen Zweckverband, the sponsor of the Sparkasse Chemnitz.

Kohlmann was a candidate in the 2013 mayoral election in Chemnitz. In the election on 16 June, he received 5.6% of the vote. Since none of the candidates achieved an absolute majority in the election, a new election was held on 30 June 2013, in which Martin Kohlmann also ran again and received 5.5% of the vote. Kohlmann had previously proposed to all of the incumbent's challengers that they agree on a new, non-partisan candidate for the new election and forego a re-election in his favour, but was unable to prevail. On 25 May 2014, Kohlmann was re-elected to the city council.

On 27 August 2018, Kohlmann organized a demonstration in connection with the fatal knife attack on a German-Cuban in Chemnitz, from which he did not exclude the right-wing extremist NPD. However, he asked that party flags not be carried. In his speech at the demonstration, he spoke out against both the elites in Germany and the Integration of immigrants. He justified the distribution of an illegally photographed arrest warrant for one of the alleged perpetrators to the ARD. Although "passing it on to us was of course problematic," publishing it on the Pro Chemnitz Facebook page was covered by press law. Die Tageszeitung commented that Kohlmann "obviously had no qualms about using a crime for his political goals."

In connection with the knife attack in Chemnitz, Kohlmann spoke out in favour of Saxony's autonomy and rapprochement with Poland, Hungary and the Czech Republic.

=== Free Saxons ===
On 26 February 2021, Kohlmann became chairman of the newly founded organization "Freie Sachsen" (not to be confused with the Free Saxony - Alliance of Independent Voters party founded in 2007). On the other hand, it saw itself as an umbrella for a collective movement "in the face of the lockdowns and restrictions during the COVID-19 pandemic.

Within a few months, the organization has succeeded in taking control of the discourse on Telegram, which had 150,000 subscribers as of February 2022, and influential in the organising of the Corona protests in Saxony.

Programmatically, they are calling for closer cooperation with the nations in the Visegrád Group. The Free Saxons are monarchists.

The deputy chairmen are Stefan Hartung, an NPD city councillor in Aue-Bad Schlema and district councillor in the Erzgebirgskreis and the Plauen bus operator Thomas Kaden. The party treasurer is the Pro-Chemnitz official Robert Andres, who is a city councillor in Chemnitz. The State Office for the Protection of the Constitution in Saxony has the alliance in its sights and classified it as right-wing extremist in June 2021. Since January 2022, the Free Saxons have been classified as a suspected case by the Federal Office for the Protection of the Constitution and are being monitored nationwide.

After the 2022 Russian invasion of Ukraine, Putin masks were worn and Russian flags waved at their events. The Free Saxons said "Suddenly the unvaccinated are no longer the main enemy No. 1!" Now "the Russians are enemy No. 1".

The Free Saxons ran in the 2022 Saxony local elections with candidates for the district of North Saxony, the district of Sächsische Schweiz-Osterzgebirge and the Erzgebirgskreis district. They were unable to win any seats.

In September 2023, Kohlmann explained that the Free Saxons' reasons for running in the 2024 local elections were that they wanted to gain information in local parliaments; in addition, potential city and municipal councillors should acquire skills and knowledge of public administration so that they could fall back on such people after a "change". However, the Free Saxons would not become "part of the system" by running in elections, because they were "not there as friends and to support the whole thing, but to look around, to learn from the opponent and to make life more difficult for him".

Kohlmann was his party's top candidate in the 2024 Saxony state election. In the election they did not win any seats but did garner 52,195 votes (2.2%).
