= OTZ (disambiguation) =

OTZ or otz may refer to:

- Oetz or Ötz, a municipality in Austria
- abbreviation for the German newspaper, Ostthüringer Zeitung
- IATA code for Ralph Wien Memorial Airport in Alaska
- OTZ, a posture emoticon used for representing a great admiration, see Emoticon#Orz
- ISO 639-3 language code for Ixtenco Otomi, a native American language spoken in San Juan Bautista Ixtenco, Tlaxcala, Mexico
