= Ronny Kupke =

German politician

- Ronny Kupke in 2025

Member of the Landtag of Saxony
- Incumbent
- Assumed office 2024

Personal details
- Born: 1977 (age 48–49) Chemnitz
- Party: Sahra Wagenknecht Alliance (since 2024)

Ronny Kupke (born 1977) is a German politician (BSW). Since October 2024 he has been a member of the Landtag of Saxony, and since January 2026 chairman of the BSW parliamentary group there. Since September 2025 he has been, together with Jörg Scheibe, co-chairman of the BSW Saxony.

== Biography ==
Ronny Kupke is a trained office administrator, social insurance specialist, and certified specialist in the social and health sector, and works as chairman of the AOK Plus staff council.

Ronny Kupke lives in Chemnitz and is an active member of ver.di and a member of the AOK Federal Collective Bargaining and Negotiation Commission. He was also a member of the Examination Board for Social Security Specialists (2016–2023).

Ronny Kupke is an honorary judge at the Saxony State Labour Court and has been a lay judge at the Chemnitz Regional Court since 2019.

== Political career ==
Ronny Kupke joined the Sahra Wagenknecht Alliance in 2024 and was elected Deputy State Chairman in February 2024. Following the 2024 Saxony local elections, Kupke became a member of the Chemnitz City Council in June 2024. In the 2024 Saxony state election, Kupke was elected to the Landtag of Saxony, having been placed fourth on the BSW state list. In the Chemnitz 1 constituency, he received 12.4% of the first-preference votes (5,633 personal votes).

From October 2024, he was deputy chairman of the BSW parliamentary group in the state parliament, and since January 2026 he has been chairman of the parliamentary group. His main areas of focus are health, care, social affairs and social cohesion.

Ronny Kupke has been chairman of the Committee on Social Affairs, Health and Social Cohesion since January 2025.

On 13 September 2025, he was elected state chairman of the BSW Saxony at the state party conference in Bautzen, together with Jörg Scheibe.
