= Free Voters of Saxony =

Free Voters of Saxony Freie Wähler Sachsen
- Abbreviation: FW
- Leader: Bernd Schulze; Anselm Meyer; Günter Hutschalik
- Chairperson: Thomas Weidinger
- Headquarters: Neukirchen, Zwickau
- Youth wing: Young Free Voters
- Political position: Centre-right
- National affiliation: Free Voters
- Landtag of Saxony: 1 / 120

Website
- fwsachsen.de

Free Voters Saxony (officially: FREIE WÄHLER – State Association of Saxony) is a state association of the Free Voters party in the Free State of Saxony. Since the constitution of the 8th Saxon State Parliament after the 2024 Saxony state election, the party has been represented by one representative in the Landtag of Saxony, Matthias Berger.

== History ==
A forerunner of the Free Voters already ran in the 2009 Saxony state election, Free Saxony – Alliance of Independent Voters, not to be confused with the party of the same name founded in 2021, achieved 1.4% at that time. The Free Voters themselves then ran in the 2014, 2019 and 2024 elections.

In 2014, the party received 1.6 percent. The party was able to more than double this result in the 2019 election. The share of second votes rose by 1.8% to 3.4%. With this result, the Free Voters were the seventh strongest force. By February 2024, the Free Voters were represented in the state parliament by Stephan Hösl, who defected from the Christian Democratic Union of Germany.

In the 2024 election, the Free Voters lost 1.1 percent again, but were able to win the direct mandate in the Leipzig Land 3 constituency with Grimma Mayor Matthias Berger, who was also the party's top candidate. Berger received 36.6% of the direct votes. However, since the basic mandate clause in Saxony only applies if two direct mandates are won, Berger remains an individual representative in the 8th Saxon State Parliament. Statewide, the party received 113,062 direct votes (4.8%) and 53,027 list votes (2.3%). In the state parliament, Berger sits in the last row between the CDU and the Alliance 90/The Greens.
