= Leipzig Land 3 =

State electoral district of Germany

23: Leipzig Land 3
- Electoral district for the Landtag of Saxony
- Leipzig Land 3 in 2024
- District: Leipzig (district)
- Electorate: 54,499 (2024)
- Major settlements: Bad Lausick, Colditz, Grimma, and Naunhof

Current electoral district
- Party: Free Voters
- Member: Matthias Berger

Leipzig Land 3 is an electoral constituency (German: Wahlkreis) represented in the Landtag of Saxony. It elects one member via first-past-the-post voting. Under the constituency numbering system, it is designated as constituency 23. It is within the district of Leipzig.

== Geography ==
The constituency comprises the towns of Bad Lausick, Colditz, Grimma, and Naunhof, and the municipalities of Belgershain, Großpösna, Otterwisch, and Parthenstein within the district of Leipzig.

There were 54,499 eligible voters in 2024.

== Members ==
Election	Member	Party	%
2014	Svend-Gunnar Kirmes	CDU	42.3
2019	Svend-Gunnar Kirmes	CDU	29.9
2024	Matthias Berger	FW	36.6

== Election results ==
=== 2024 election ===
State election (2024): Leipzig Land 3
Notes:	Blue background denotes the winner of the electorate vote. Pink background denotes a candidate elected from their party list. Yellow background denotes an electorate win by a list member, or other incumbent. A ✓ or ✗ denotes status of any incumbent, win or lose respectively.						
Party	Candidate	Votes	%	±%	Party votes	%	±%
FW	Matthias Berger	14,882	36.6	▲23.5	5,393	13.2	▲6.4
AfD	Jörg Dornau	12,479	30.6	▲1.1	12,627	30.9	▲1.6
CDU	Volker Klostermann	9,021	22.2	▼7.7	11,939	29.2	▼4.0
BSW					4,282	10.5	
SPD	Ingo Runge	1,686	4.1	▼2.4	2,647	6.5	▼1.3
Left	Daniel Peisker	1,316	3.2	▼7.5	951	2.3	▼6.1
Greens	Adriano Schwanke	677	1.7	▼3.8	992	2.4	▼2.9
FDP	Philipp Alexander Loll	356	0.9	▼2.6	276	0.7	▼3.1
Freie Sachsen	Mario Franz	298	0.7		774	1.9	
APT					340	0.8	
PARTEI					201	0.5	▼0.5
BD					106	0.3	
Values					67	0.2	
Pirates					63	0.2	
dieBasis					57	0.1	
V-Partei3					38	0.1	
BüSo					29	0.1	
Bündnis C					25	0.1	
ÖDP					18	0.0	
Informal votes		458			348		
Total valid votes		40,715			40,825		
Turnout		41,173	75.5	▲12.0			
FW win new seat	Majority	2,403	6.0				

=== 2019 election ===
State election (2019): Leipzig Land 3
Notes:	Blue background denotes the winner of the electorate vote. Pink background denotes a candidate elected from their party list. Yellow background denotes an electorate win by a list member, or other incumbent. A ✓ or ✗ denotes status of any incumbent, win or lose respectively.						
Party	Candidate	Votes	%	±%	Party votes	%	±%
CDU	✓ Svend-Gunnar Kirmes	10,839	29.9	▼12.4	12,078	33.2	▼10.9
AfD	Jörg Dornau	10,709	29.5	▲17.4	10,661	29.3	▲18.4
FW	Matthias Schmiedel	4,741	13.1		2,456	6.8	▲7.7
Left	Kerstin Köditz	3,874	10.7	▼9.5	3,050	8.4	▼8.3
SPD	Ingo Runge	2,377	6.6	▼4.9	2,835	7.8	▼3.9
Greens	André Engelhardt	1,965	5.4	▲1.4	1,928	5.3	▲1.3
FDP	Matthias Constantin	1,251	3.4	▼1.2	1,384	3.8	▼0.3
APT					530	1.5	▲0.4
The Blue Party	Dorothea von Below	509	1.4		352	1.0	
PARTEI					343	0.9	▲0.5
Verjüngungsforschung					182	0.5	
NPD					175	0.5	▼4.1
Pirates					97	0.3	▼0.5
ÖDP					67	0.2	
Humanists					49	0.1	
Awakening of German Patriots - Central Germany					47	0.1	
PDV					45	0.1	
DKP					29	0.1	
BüSo					17	0.0	▼0.1
Informal votes		493			433		
Total valid votes		36,265			36,325		
Turnout		36,758	66.3	▲19.1			
CDU hold	Majority	130	0.4	▼21.7			

=== 2014 election ===
State election (2014): Leipzig Land 3
Notes:	Blue background denotes the winner of the electorate vote. Pink background denotes a candidate elected from their party list. Yellow background denotes an electorate win by a list member, or other incumbent. A ✓ or ✗ denotes status of any incumbent, win or lose respectively.						
Party	Candidate	Votes	%	±%	Party votes	%	±%
CDU	Svend-Gunnar Kirmes	11,218	42.3		11,725	44.1	
Left		5,353	20.2		4,444	16.7	
AfD		3,211	12.1		2,904	10.9	
SPD		3,056	11.5		3,122	11.7	
FDP		1,216	4.6		1,085	4.1	
NPD		1,086	4.1		1,228	4.6	
Greens		1,071	4.0		1,075	4.0	
APT					304	1.1	
FW					304	1.1	
Pirates		285	1.1		210	0.8	
PARTEI					99	0.4	
Pro Germany Citizens' Movement					40	0.2	
BüSo					33	0.1	
DSU					32	0.1	
Informal votes		463			354		
Total valid votes		26,496			26,605		
Turnout		26,959	47.2	▼14.0			
CDU win new seat	Majority	5,865	22.1				

== See also ==
- Politics of Saxony
- Landtag of Saxony
