= Matthias Berger =

German politician (born 1968)

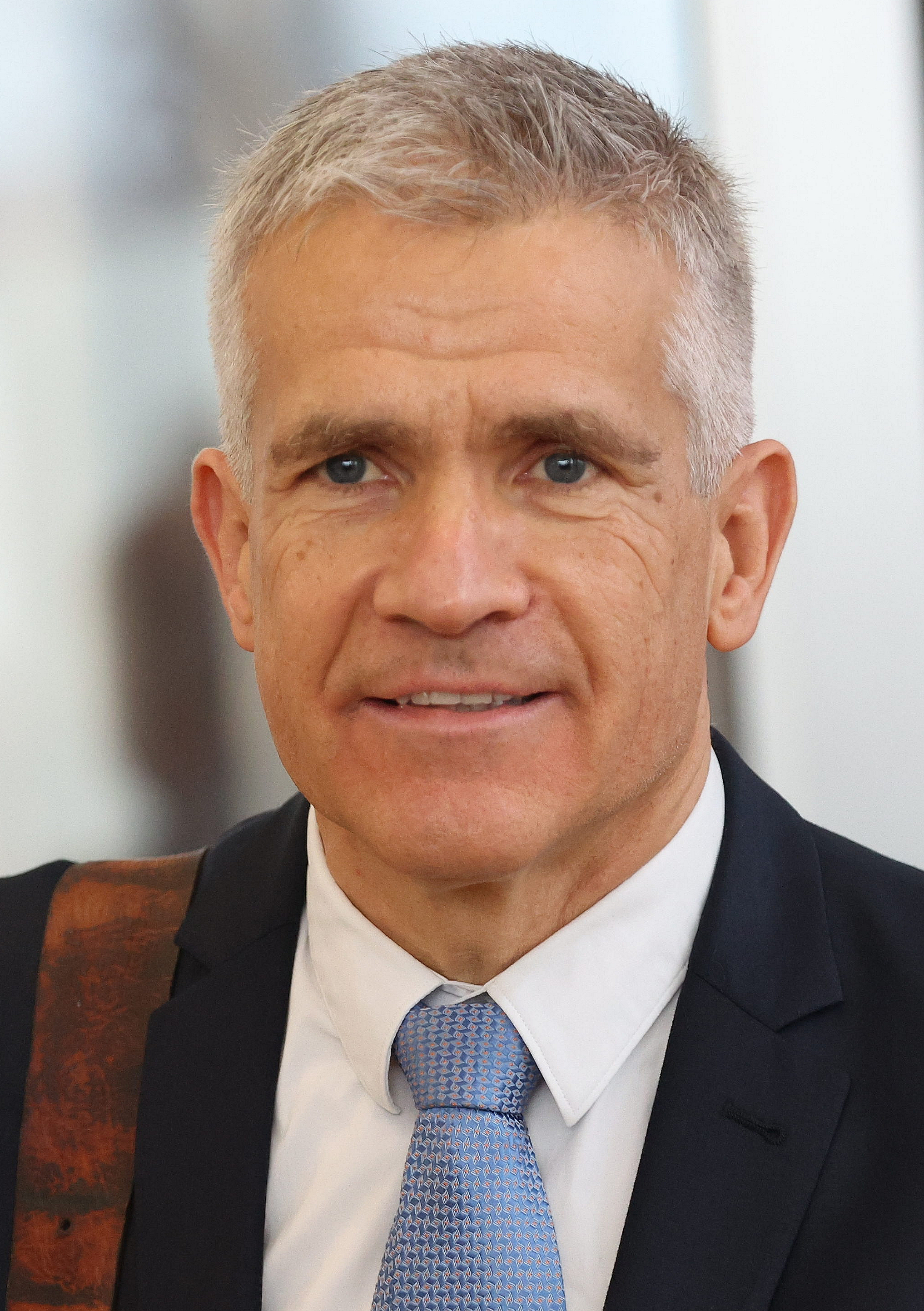

Member of the Landtag of Saxony
- Incumbent
- Assumed office 1 September 2024
- Preceded by: Svend-Gunnar Kirmes
- Constituency: Leipzig Land 3

Mayor of Grimma
- In office 2001 – 1 October 2024

Personal details
- Born: 2 January 1968 (age 58) Grimma, Bezirk Leipzig, East Germany
- Party: Free Voters (since 2023)
- Other political affiliations: Independent (until 2023); CDU (2001)
- Occupation: Lawyer, politician

Matthias Berger (born 2 January 1968 in Grimma) is a German politician who is a member of the Landtag of Saxony. On 1 December 2023 Berger was selected as the top candidate for the Free Voters of Saxony for the 2024 Saxony state election in which he was elected.

== Political career ==
As an independent politician, Berger was first elected mayor of Grimma on 10 June 2001: he received 57.6 percent of the vote as an independent candidate with the nomination from the Christian Democratic Union (CDU). A year later, Berger became known nationwide with his fight against the effects of the "flood of the century" on his city. On 8 June 2008, Berger received 98.2 percent of the vote in the mayoral election. On 7 June 2015, he was confirmed in office with almost 90 percent of the vote and on 12 June 2022 with 85.9 percent.

Together with Antje Hermenau, Berger has been involved in the "Citizens' Movement for Saxony" since autumn 2018, a self-described political "collective movement of the centre". On 1 December 2023, Berger was nominated as the top candidate of the State Association of Free Voters Saxony for the 2024 Saxony state election on 1 September 2024. In the election he was directly elected in the constituency of Leipzig-Land III. He stood for election as Minister-President of Saxony and proposed a technocratic government.

== Legal career ==
Matthias Berger is a lawyer in a law firm in Grimma; due to his elected office as mayor, his legal practice is suspended.

== Personal life ==
Berger is married and has two children.
