= Nam Duy Nguyen =

German politician (born 1996)

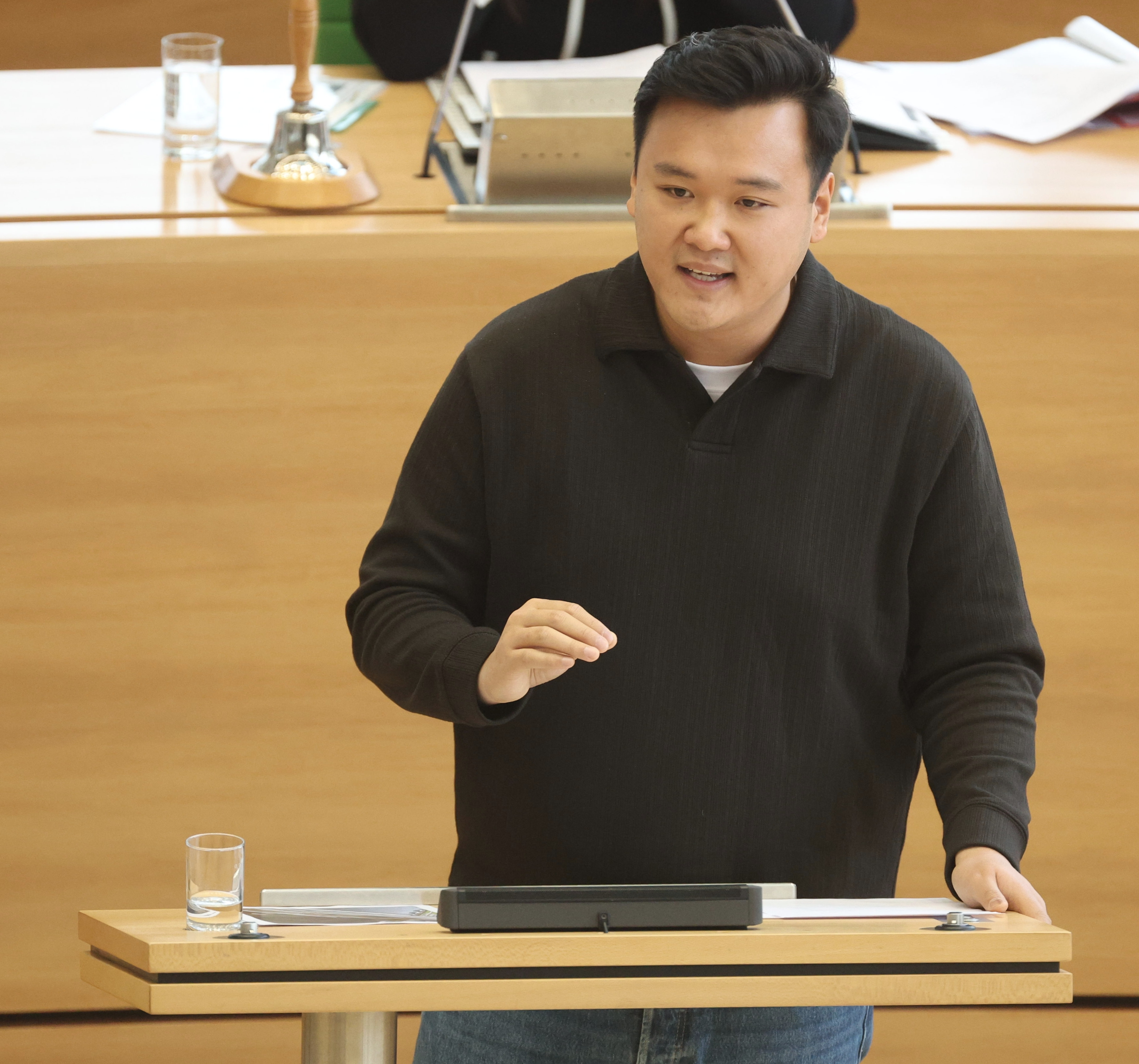
- Nguyen in 2024

Member of the Landtag of Saxony
- Incumbent
- Assumed office 1 September 2024
- Preceded by: Ronald Pohle
- Constituency: Leipzig 1

Personal details
- Born: 1996 (age 29–30) Dresden
- Party: Die Linke (since 2015)

Nam Duy Nguyen (born 1996 in Dresden) is a German politician serving as a member of the Landtag of Saxony since 2024. He has been a member of Die Linke since 2015.
