= Ostthüringer Zeitung =

German newspaper

The Ostthüringer Zeitung (OTZ) is a German newspaper covering eastern Thuringia with a head office in Gera. Together with the Thüringische Landeszeitung it has a daily circulation of 78,244 copies as of 2019, a 57.5% decrease since 1998.

Since the early 1990s the OTZ has been printed daily except Sundays in eastern Thuringia by the publisher Ostthüringer Zeitung Verlag, which is owned 40% by the Funke Mediengruppe. Together with the Thüringer Allgemeine (TA) and the Thüringische Landeszeitung (TLZ), it is part of the "Zeitungsgruppe Thüringen" sales network. The total circulation of the three publications as of 2019 is 220,306 copies. In some areas, such as Gera, Jena and the Saale-Holzland district, the OTZ and TLZ appear in parallel. In Gera, the OTZ and TLZ produce a common local section that differs only in layout and design. In Jena the OTZ and TLZ exist separately in Jena are still formally separate but since 2009 have produced common local section with minor differences.

Regional editions appear in Bad Lobenstein, Eisenberg, Gera, Greiz, Jena, Pößneck, Rudolstadt, Saalfeld, Schleiz, Schmölln, Stadtroda and Zeulenroda-Triebes.

== History ==
The OTZ arose indirectly from the Volkswacht, which was the official press organ of the Socialist Unity Party (SED) for the district of Gera. Across its twelve local editions, the Volkswacht had a total circulation of 215,200 copies.

In the era of rapid change in 1989-1990, Dieter Hausold was elected as the new editor-in-chief of the Volkswacht on 8 January 1990. He resigned just 10 days later was replaced by Ullrich Erzigkeit, who enforced the separation from the SED and instituted a name change of the newspaper to the Ostthüringer Nachrichten (OTN). There were threats of murders and bombs. The letters to the editor section was widely read and the new parties and political movements were given the opportunity for self-expression. Erzigkeit was chief editor of the newspaper until the end of 2013, during which time it renamed itself after an acquisition to the Ostthüringer Zeitung.

Since 2010, the content of the OTZ has increasingly been integrated with its sister publications from the Mediengruppe Thüringen, the Thüringer Allgemeine (TA) and the Thüringische Landeszeitung.

At the end of 2013, the printing center in Löbichau was closed, which laid off more than 100 employees. Since then, the OTZ has been partly printed in the printing house of the Zeitungsgruppe Thüringen in Erfurt and partly in Chemnitz.
