= Citizens' Movement Pro Chemnitz =

German political party

Citizens' Movement Pro Chemnitz Bürgerbewegung Pro Chemnitz
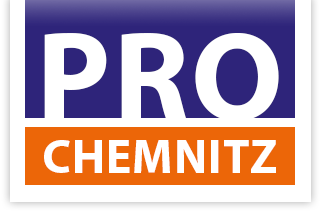
- Abbreviation: Pro Chemnitz
- Leader: Karl Martin Kohlmannd and Reinhold Breede
- Founded: 2009
- Split from: The Republicans
- Headquarters: Markt 1 D-09111 Chemnitz
- Political position: Right-wing to far-right
- Regional affiliation: Free Saxony
- Colours: Blue and orange

Website
- pro-chemnitz.de

The Citizens' Movement Pro Chemnitz (German: Bürgerbewegung Pro Chemnitz; known as Pro Chemnitz) is a municipal political party in the German city of Chemnitz. and is an affiliated with the Free Saxony party.

== History ==
The Citizens' Movement Pro Chemnitz was initiated in 2009 by Karl Martin Kohlmann, a former Chemnitz city council member for The Republicans, and Reinhold Breede, former president of the city council at the beginning of the 1990s and a former CDU member.

In March 2009 the city council group of The Republicans left the party en bloc, owing to internal disputes, and became part of Pro Chemnitz and therefore the Citizens' Movement's parliamentary group.

In November 2019, online payment service PayPal blocked the movement's account after more than 100,000 people petitioned it.

== Elections ==
=== Chemnitz municipal elections ===
In the 2009 Chemnitz municipal election, the Citizens' Movement Pro Chemnitz (under the abbreviation DSU because they had members of that party on the list, later elections were under Pro C/DSU) received 12,608 votes, 4.57 per cent of the electorate, and as a result took three out of 60 seats in the city council.

Council elections	26 May 2019	25 May 2014	7 June 2009	13 June 2004	14 June 1999	12 June 1994	6 May 1990
Citizens' Movement Pro Chemnitz/DSU (until 2004: REP)	5	3	3	4 (5)	1	–	–
Total seats	60	60	60	54	60	60	80
