= BSW Saxony =

BSW Saxony BSW Sachsen
- Abbreviation: BSW
- Chairman: Jörg Scheibe; Ronny Kupke
- Deputy Chair: Lutz Richter; Thomas Thamm
- Founded: 24 February 2024; 2 years ago
- Headquarters: Chemnitz
- Membership (2025): 553
- Ideology: Left-wing populism; Left-wing nationalism; Left-conservatism; Socialism
- Political position: Left wing
- National affiliation: Alliance for Social Justice and Economic Reason
- Colours: Purple
- Landtag of Saxony: 14 / 120

Party flag

Website
- bsw-vg-sachsen.de

The BSW Saxony (German: BSW Sachsen) is the regional state association of the Alliance for Social Justice and Economic Reason (BSW) in the Free State of Saxony, Germany. Currently, the party holds 14 of the 120 seats, making it the third-largest faction in the Landtag of Saxony.

== History ==
The BSW federal party was founded by Sahra Wagenknecht on 8 January 2024, with a founding meeting in a hotel in Berlin.

Subsequently, a BSW development team was established for Saxony to ensure the necessary party structure for participation in the local and European elections as well as the state elections.

The founding assembly of BSW Saxony took place in Chemnitz on 24 February 2024 where a constitution was discussed and adopted in the state.

On 18 May 2024, the BSW Saxony met to adopt the 2024 state election programme.

In the 2024 Saxony local elections, which took place on 9 June 2024, concurrently with the 2024 European Parliament election, the party contested elections in 9 of the 10 districts (except for the district of Nordsachsen and some constituencies in other districts) and the 3 independent cities, achieving a result of 8.5% statewide. This made it the third strongest party after the CDU (24.2%) and AfD (26.9%), ahead of the SPD (7.9%), the Left Party (6.9%), and the Greens (6.7 percent). In Chemnitz one of the 9 seats won could not be filled because there were not enough BSW candidates available.

In the 2024 Saxony state election, the BSW received 277,568 votes, or 11.8% of the votes cast, and thus won 15 of the 120 seats in the Landtag of Saxony.

== State Parliament Group ==
At the beginning of the legislative period, the BSW parliamentary group was represented in the 8th Saxon Landtag by a total of 15 members. In September 2026, one member left the group.

== State Chair ==
| Zeit | Chairperson | |
|---|---|---|
| 2024–2025 | Jörg Scheibe | Sabine Zimmermann |
| Since 2025 | Jörg Scheibe | Ronny Kupke |
