= Trierische Landeszeitung =

German newspaper

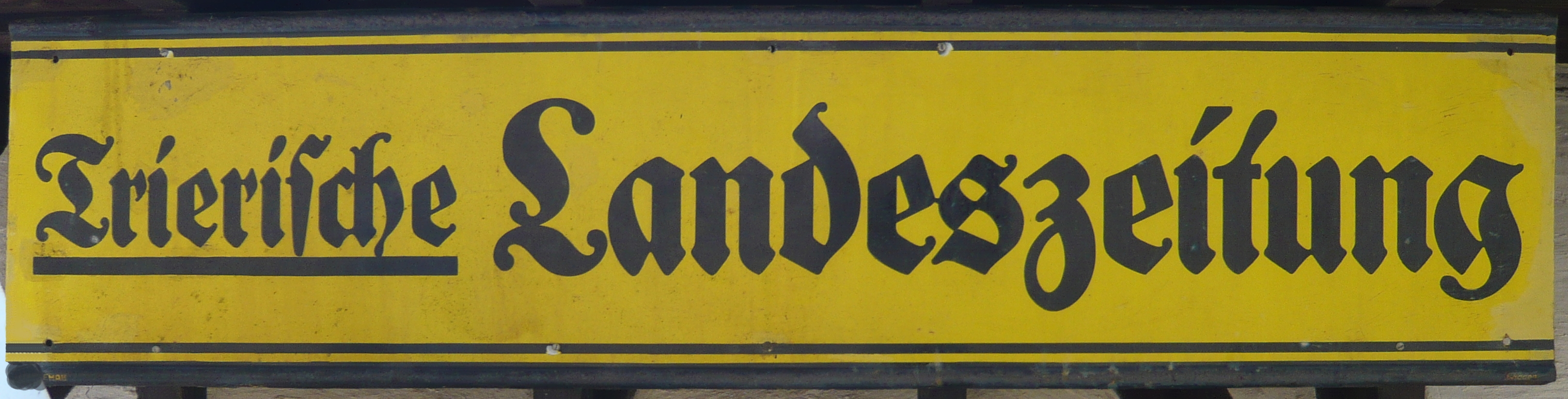

Trierische Landeszeitung or TLZ (originally Katholische Volkszeitung) was a German newspaper issued from 1875 to 1974.
