= Sabine Zimmermann (politician) =

German politician (born 1960)

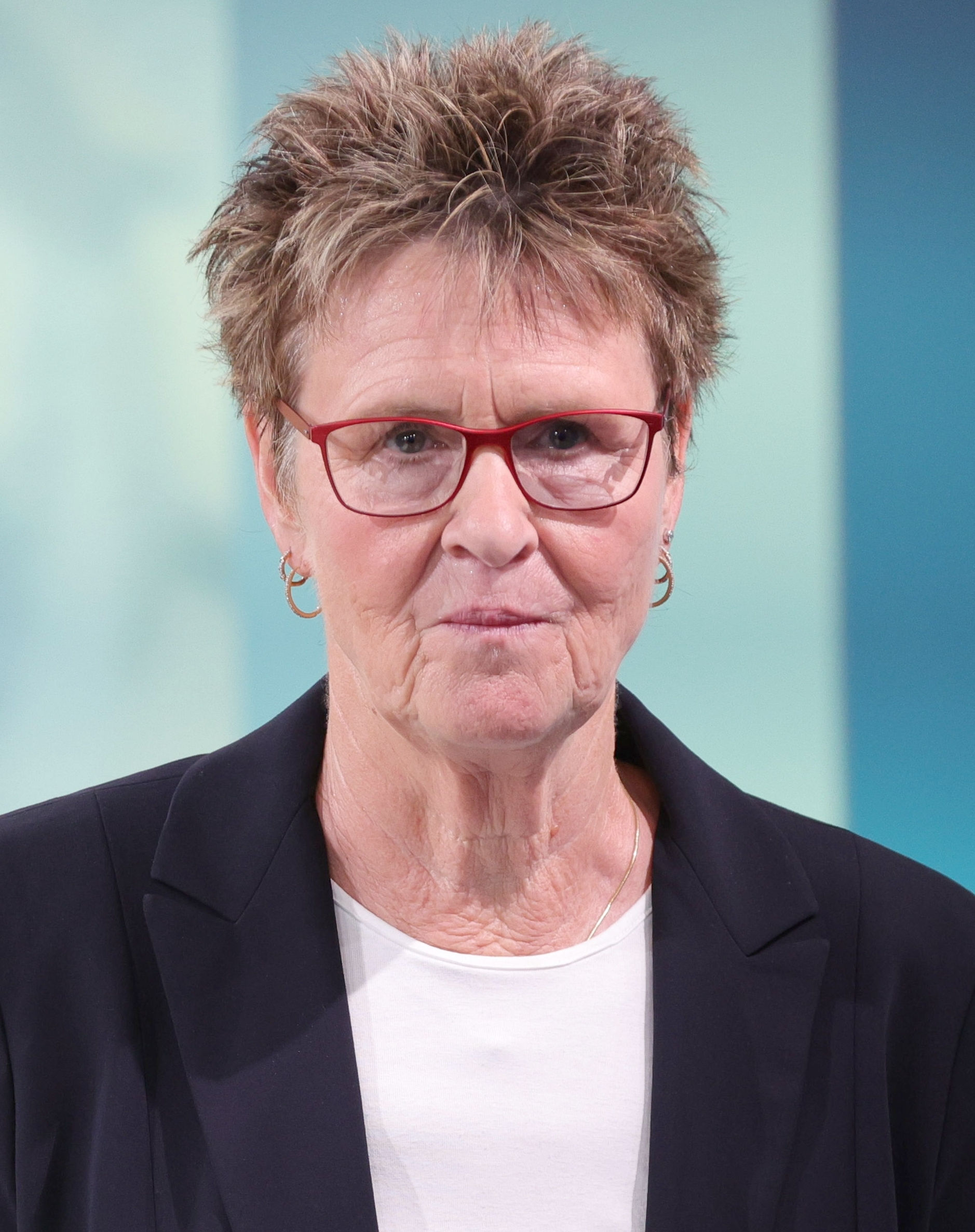
- Zimmermann in 2024

Member of the Landtag of Saxony
- Incumbent
- Assumed office 1 September 2024
- In office 16 July 2004 – 19 September 2004

Member of the Bundestag for Saxony
- In office 18 October 2005 – 26 October 2021

Personal details
- Born: 30 December 1960 (age 65) Pasewalk, Bezirk Neubrandenburg, East Germany
- Party: BSW (2023–present)
- Other political affiliations: SPD (1995–2005); PDS (2005–2007); The Left (2007–2023)
- Children: 2

Sabine Zimmermann (born 30 December 1960) is a German politician. Born in Pasewalk, Bezirk Neubrandenburg, she is a member of Bündnis Sahra Wagenknecht. She served as a member of the Bundestag from the state of Saxony between 2005 and 2021, for The Left.

== Career ==
Zimmermann became a member of the Bundestag after the 2005 German federal election. She is a member of the Committee for Tourism, the Main Committee and the Committee for Family, Senior Citizens, Women and Youth.

Zimmerman was the top candidate for BSW Saxony in the 2024 Saxony state election.
