= Bermsgrün =

Coordinates: 50°31′N 12°47′E

Bermsgrün is a district in Schwarzenberg, Saxony, Germany. It has a population of 1359 residents as of 9 May 2011.
