= Freie Sachsen =

German secessionist organization (e. 2021)

Free Saxons Freie Sachsen
- Abbreviation: FS
- Leader: Martin Kohlmann
- Founded: February 2021
- Headquarters: Chemnitz
- Newspaper: Aufgewacht – Die Deutsche Stimme
- Membership (2023): approx. 1,200
- Ideology: Saxon autonomism Monarchism (Saxon); Neo-Nazism
- Political position: Far-right
- Colors: Green
- Landtag of Saxony: 0 / 120
- Landrat of Saxony: 0 / 9
- District councils/city councils: 32 / 1,101

Party flag
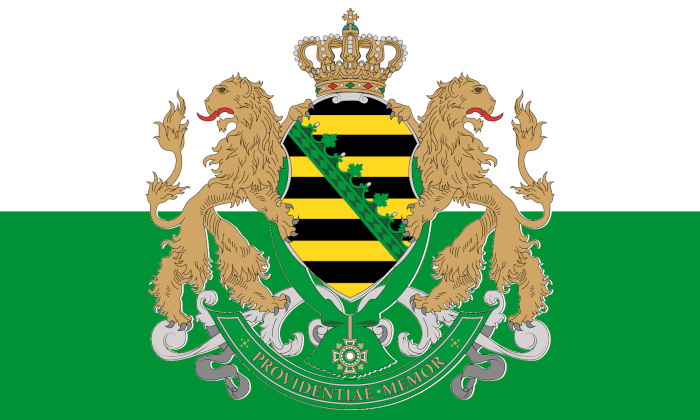

Website
- freie-sachsen.info

Freie Sachsen (FS; lit. 'Free Saxons') is a far-right monarchist, autonomist, secessionist and Neo-Nazi movement within the German State of Saxony. It seeks to restore the former Kingdom of Saxony through an autonomist government or a "Saexit if Necessary".

== History ==
=== Founding ===
The inaugural meeting of "Free Saxons" in the Bermsgrün guest house was an occasion to question the use of the municipal building. The small party "Freie Sachsen" played a key role in mobilizing for the protests against COVID-19 pandemic measures in Saxony. The organization seeks to extend its influence from the streets to town halls and possibly also to the state parliament.

On February 26, 2021, Martin Kohlmann became chairman of the newly founded organization "Freie Sachsen" (not to be confused with the party Freie Sachsen – Alliance of Independent Voters, founded in 2007) in the Haus des Gastes in Bermsgrün, which describes itself as a party according to the party law. Contrarily, Freie Sachsen sees itself "in view of the state corona coercive measures" as an umbrella for a collection movement. Within a few months, the organization dominated discourse on Telegram, which had 150,000 subscribers as of February 2022, and to control the radical actions of the COVID-19 pandemic protesters in Saxony. Programmatically, they call for stronger cooperation with the Visegrád Group, with which they have views of security or family policy more in common than with West German federal states. The Free Saxons reject democracy and demand "to involve the Saxon royal family in shaping the future".

The State Office for the Protection of the Constitution of Saxony classified the alliance as right-wing extremists in June 2021. Since January 2022, the Federal Office for the Protection of the Constitution has classified the Free Saxons as a suspected case of anti-constitutional activity and observed them nationwide.

=== Development ===
After the Russian invasion of Ukraine in a series of anti-interventionist protests and demonstrations, Putin masks were worn and Russian flags waved during the group's "walks". The explanation of the Free Saxons: "Suddenly the unvaccinated are no longer the number one enemy!" Now "the Russians are the number one enemy".

In November 2023, a delegation associated with "Freie Sachsen" traveled to Russia, where it was received in the State Duma and hosted by the agent Maria Butina. One member of the delegation was Alena Dirksen, the owner of the Russian restaurant "Rodina" in Mittweida. She had previously attracted public attention in October 2022 after posting a video on TikTok in which, in connection with a pro-Ukrainian demonstration in Dresden, she asked Vladimir Putin to bomb the city.

Members of the party also take part in weekly Monday demonstrations to protest rising gas, energy, food prices, and immigration. They also went on to take part in anti-interventionist protests alongside members of the state association of the AfD in Saxony and The Left party, in which they showed nostalgia for an independent eastern Germany.

Supporters of the organization took part in the 2023–2024 German farmers' protests.

The party ran in the 2024 local elections in Saxony. Statewide, it achieved 2.7% of the vote, its strongest result at the district or city level being in Chemnitz, where it ran on a joint list with the Citizens' Movement Pro Chemnitz and won 4.9% of the vote. Statewide winning 32 of 1,101 seats in city and district councils, and 46 of 6,552 on city and municipal councils of municipalities within districts.

In the 2024 state election later that year, they obtained 2.2%.

=== Identity ===
The identity constructed by the Free Saxons is multifaceted and instrumental. At its core is an emphasis on Saxon distinctiveness: the use of symbols of the Kingdom of Saxony, appeals to regional commemorations, and cultural elements (dialect, Anton Günther's songs, the memory of Friedrich Augustus III). The Ore Mountains play a significant role as the party's geographic and political center of activity; this local focus is combined with pan-German motifs (quotes from patriotic poets, imperial symbols)

== Party structure ==
=== Membership and organization ===
With a membership of 1,200 people, the party accepts cross-party membership only as long as there is a basic commitment to the party's principles. Some of its members are part of other German political parties, including (and not limited to) The Republicans, Alternative for Germany, pro-Chemnitz, Free Voters and The Homeland (formerly the NPD). The Free Saxons see themselves as an umbrella organization.

It campaigned for the party-list vote of AfD voters.

=== Officials ===
- Chairman: Martin Kohlmann, founder of the Free Saxons, he is a lawyer and former member of The Republicans, German Social Union and founder of pro-Chemnitz;
- Deputy chairmen: Stefan Hartung, The Homeland (NPD) city councilor in Aue-Bad Schlema and district councilor in the Erzgebirge district, and Plauen bus operator Thomas Kaden;
- Treasurer: pro-Chemnitz functionary Robert Andrews, who is a city councilor in Chemnitz.

== Election results ==
=== State Parliament ===
Election	No. of overall votes	% of overall vote & ranking	No. of overall seats won	+/–
2024	52,195	2.22 (#8)	0 / 120	New

=== Federal Parliament (Bundestag) ===
Election	Constituency		Party list		Seats	+/–	Status
Election	Votes	%	Votes	%	Seats	+/–	Status
2025	Did not participate						

== See also ==
- House of Wettin
- East German secession from the Federal Republic of Germany
- Awakening of German Patriots - Central Germany
- Bavaria Party (EFA member)
- List of active separatist movements in Europe
