= Thüringer Allgemeine =

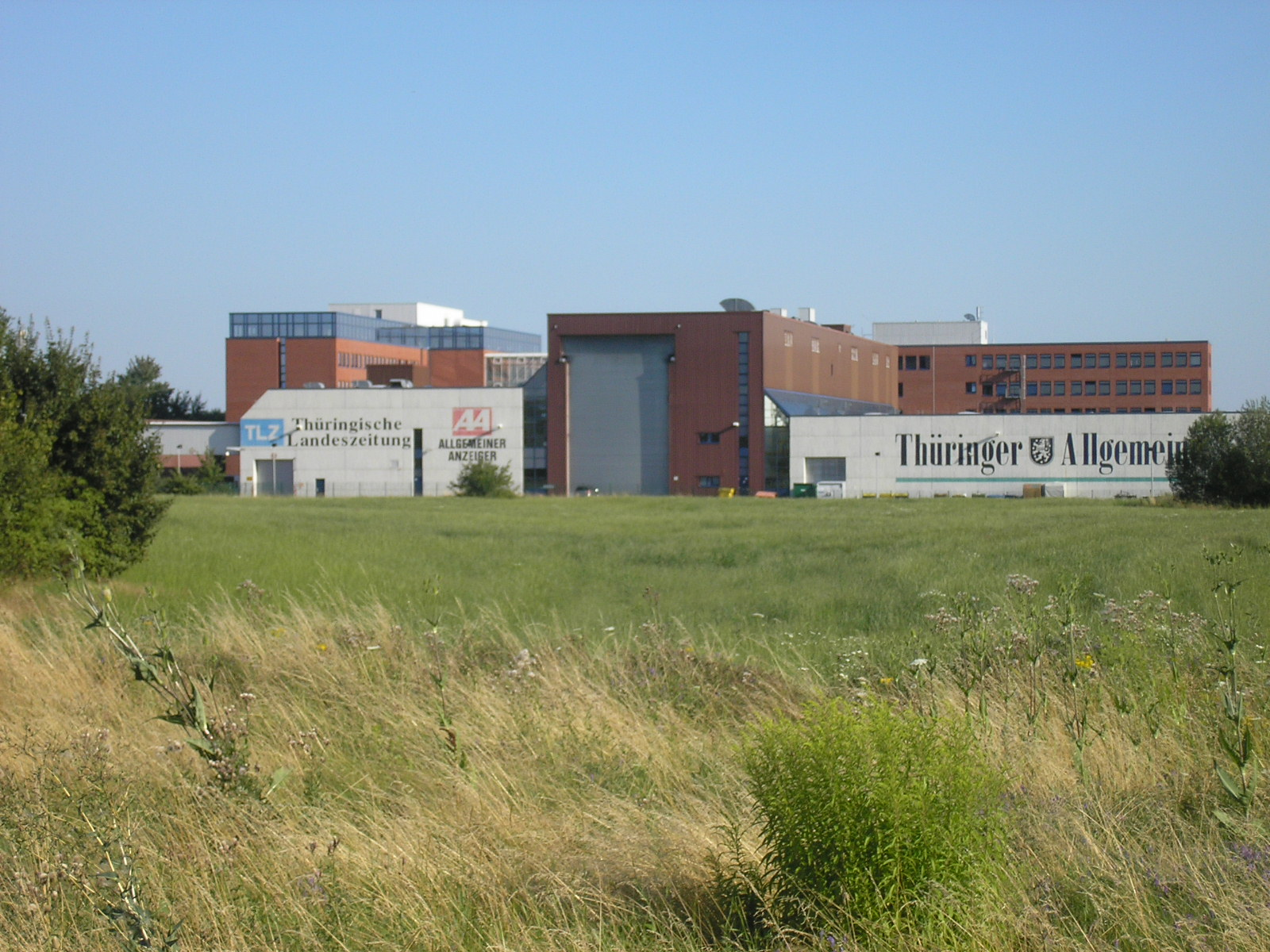
- Head office
- Editor-in-chief: Jan Hollitzer
- Language: German
- Headquarters: Erfurt
- Website: www.thueringer-allgemeine.de

Thüringer Allgemeine (TA) is a German newspaper with its head office in Erfurt.
