= Thüringische Landeszeitung =

German newspaper in Thuringia

Thüringische Landeszeitung (TLZ) is a German daily newspaper issued since 24 September 1945. Its name is translated as "the newspaper of the state of Thuringia".
