= 2024 Saxony state election =

Election in Germany

- 1 September 2024

All 120 seats in the Landtag of Saxony 61 seats needed for a majority
- Turnout: 2,367,607 (74.4%) ▲8.2 pp
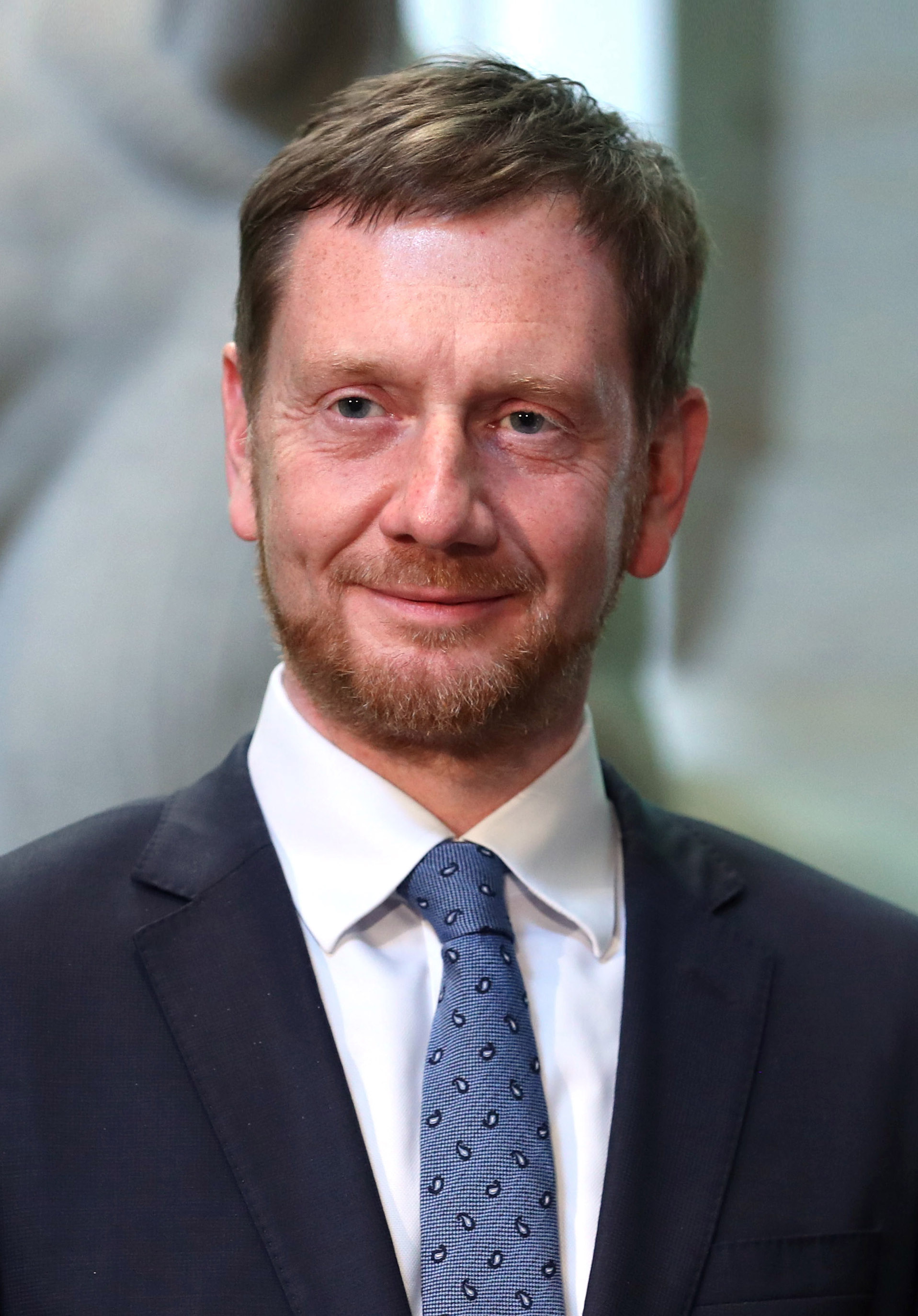

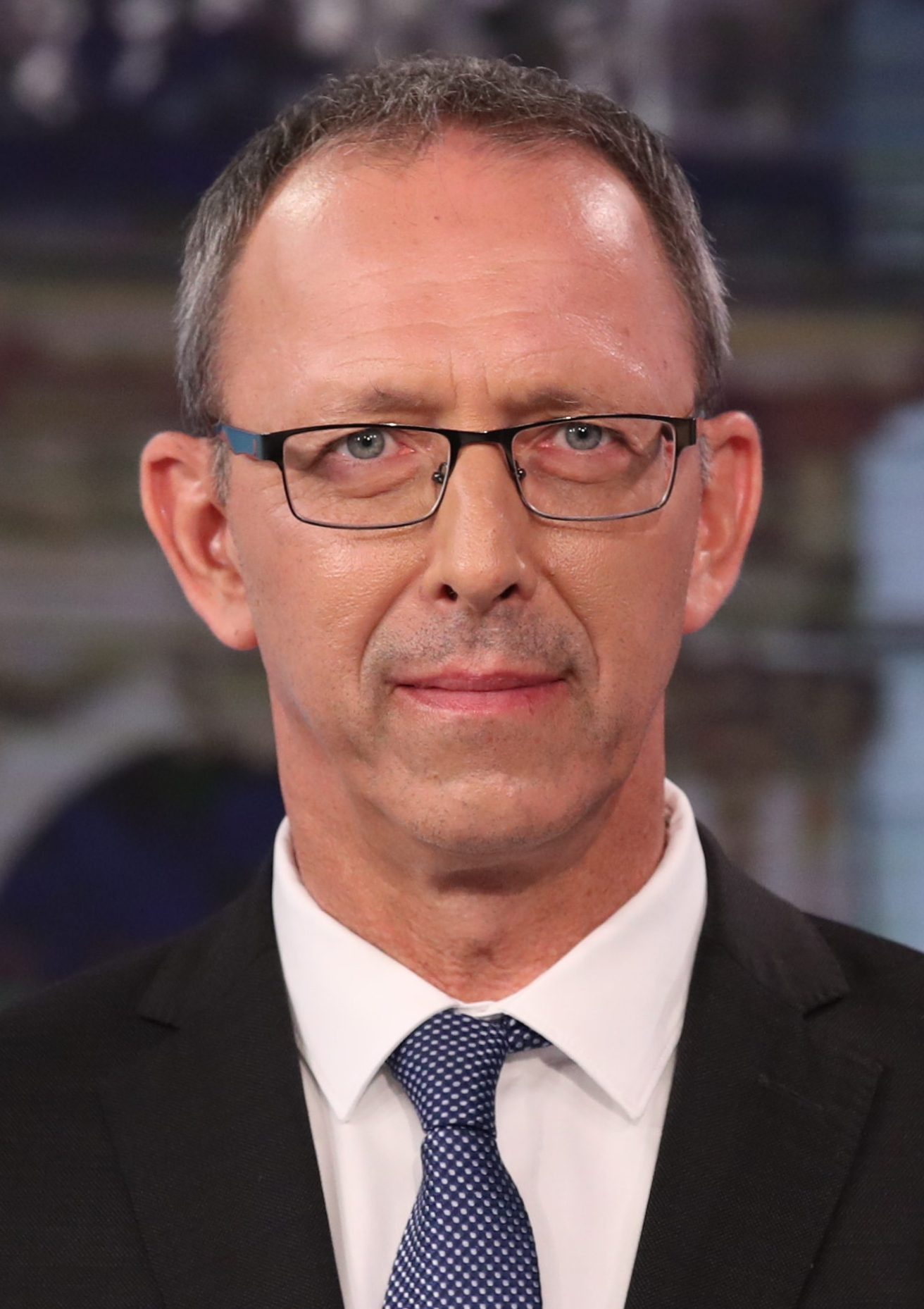

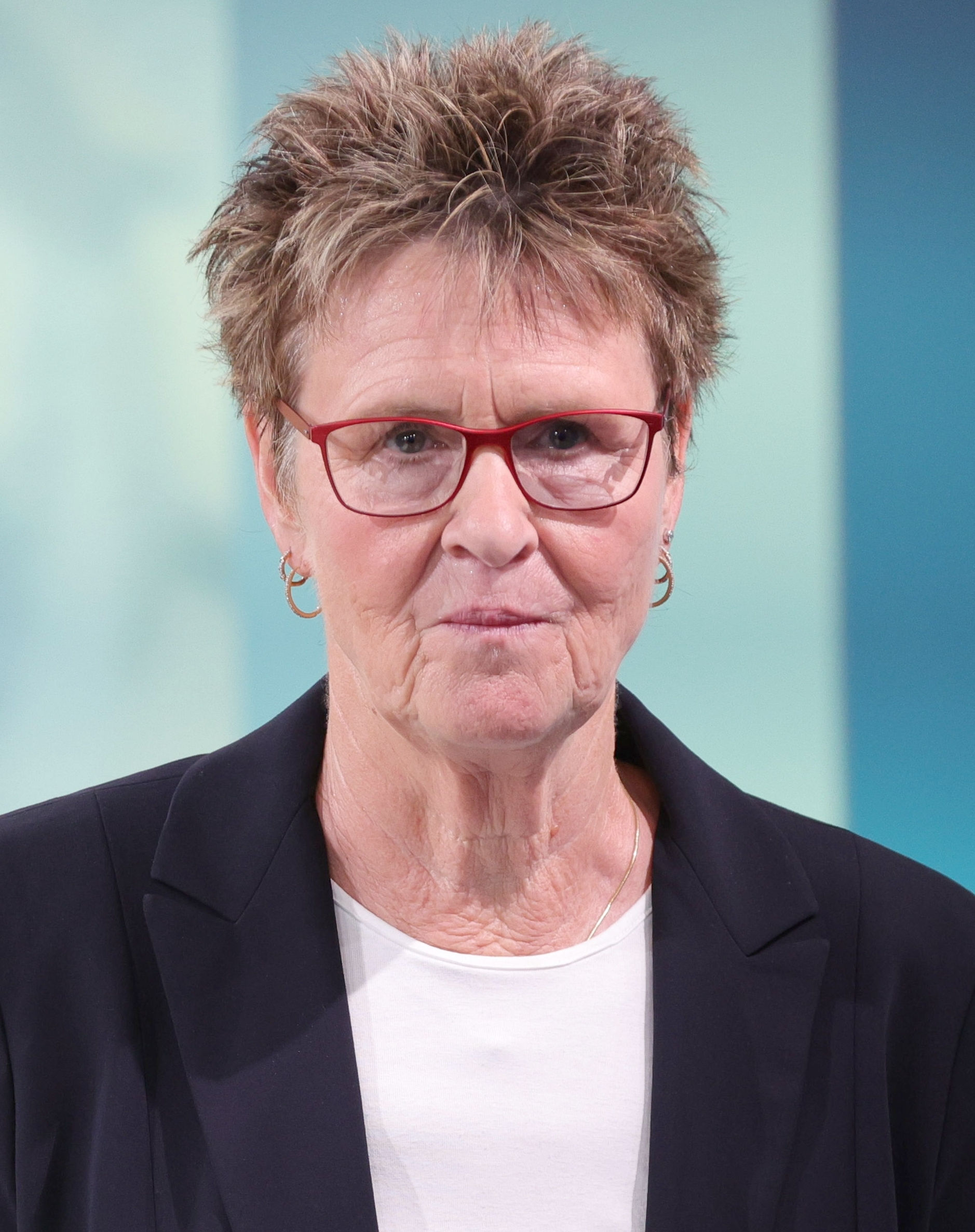

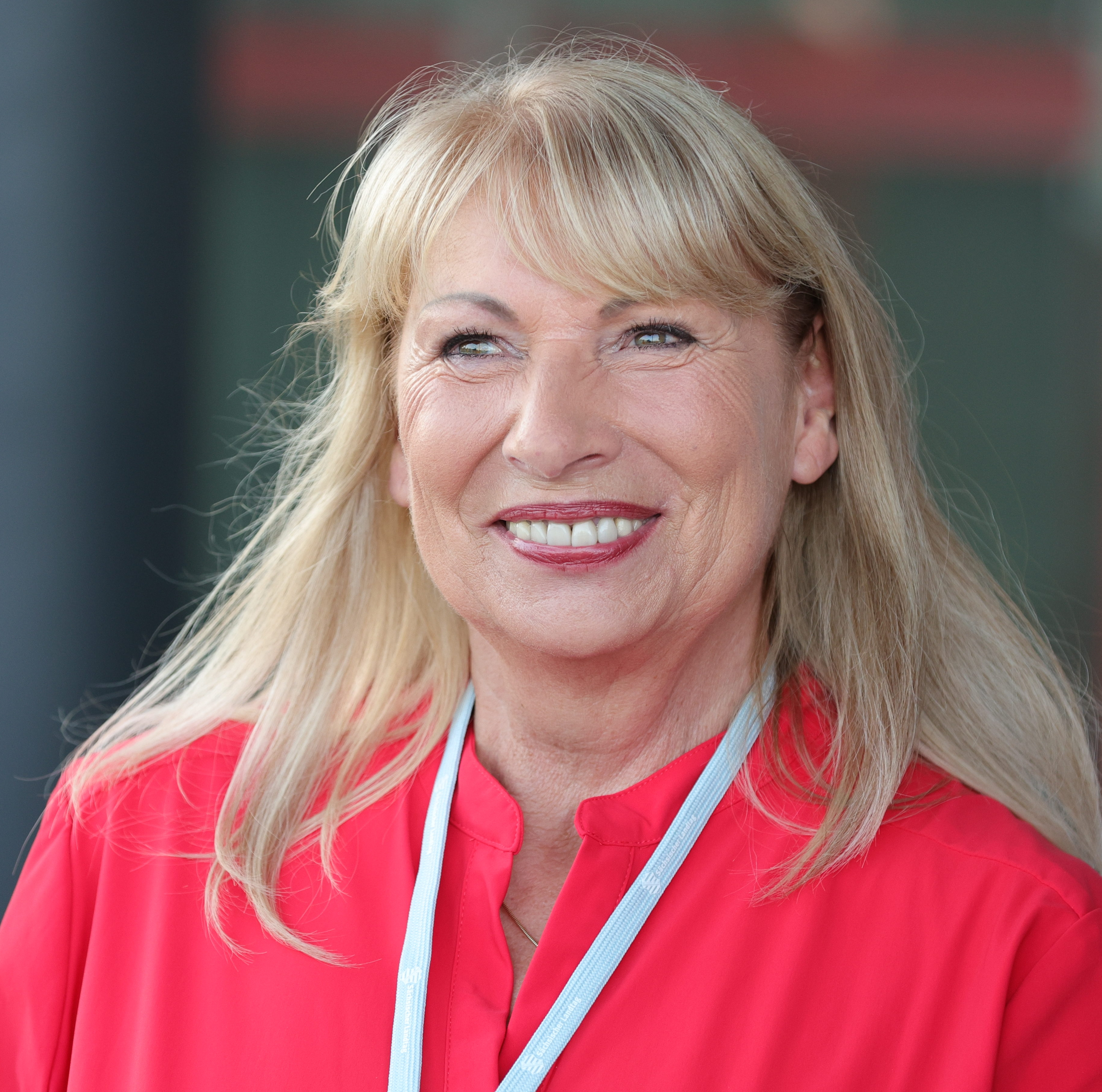

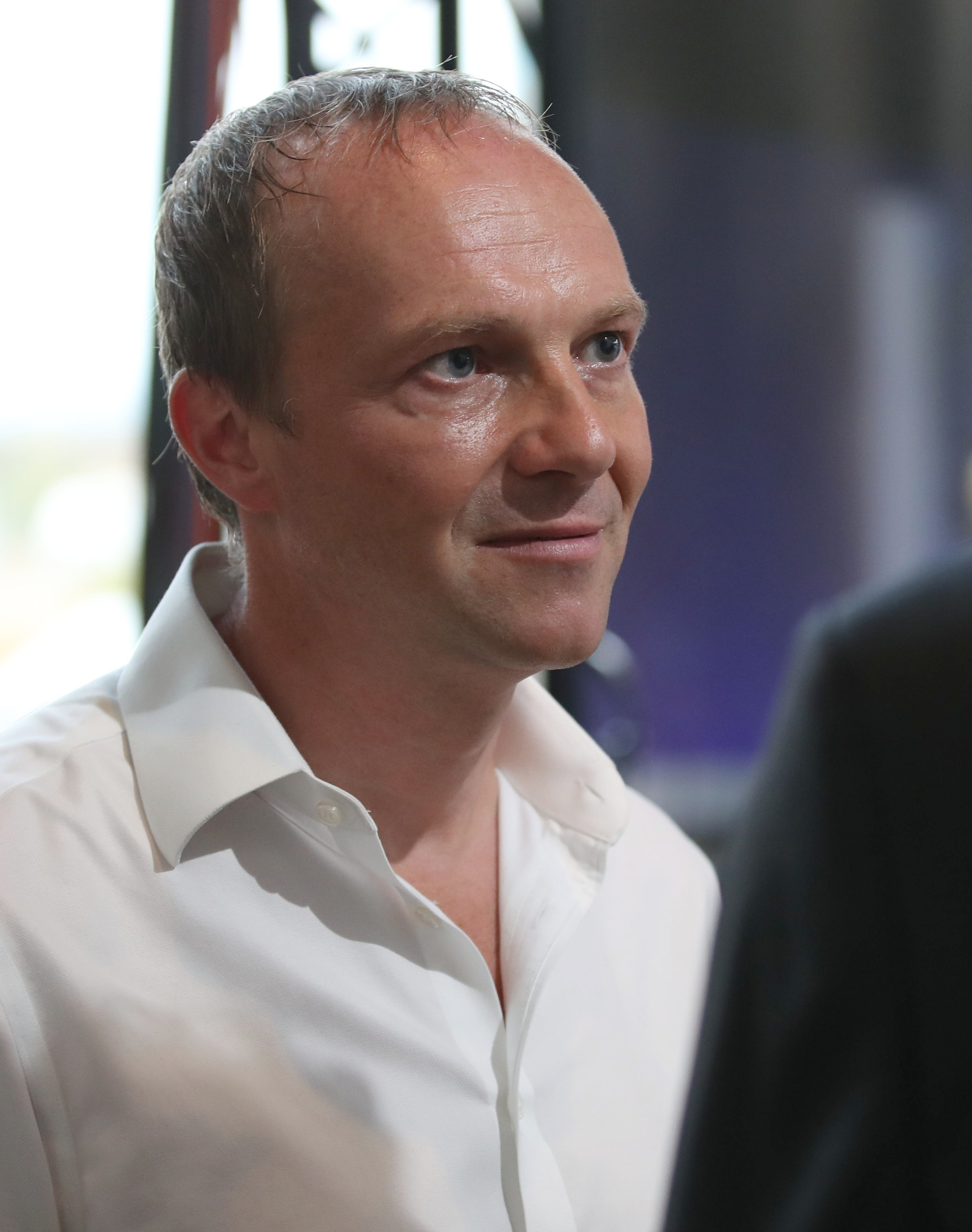

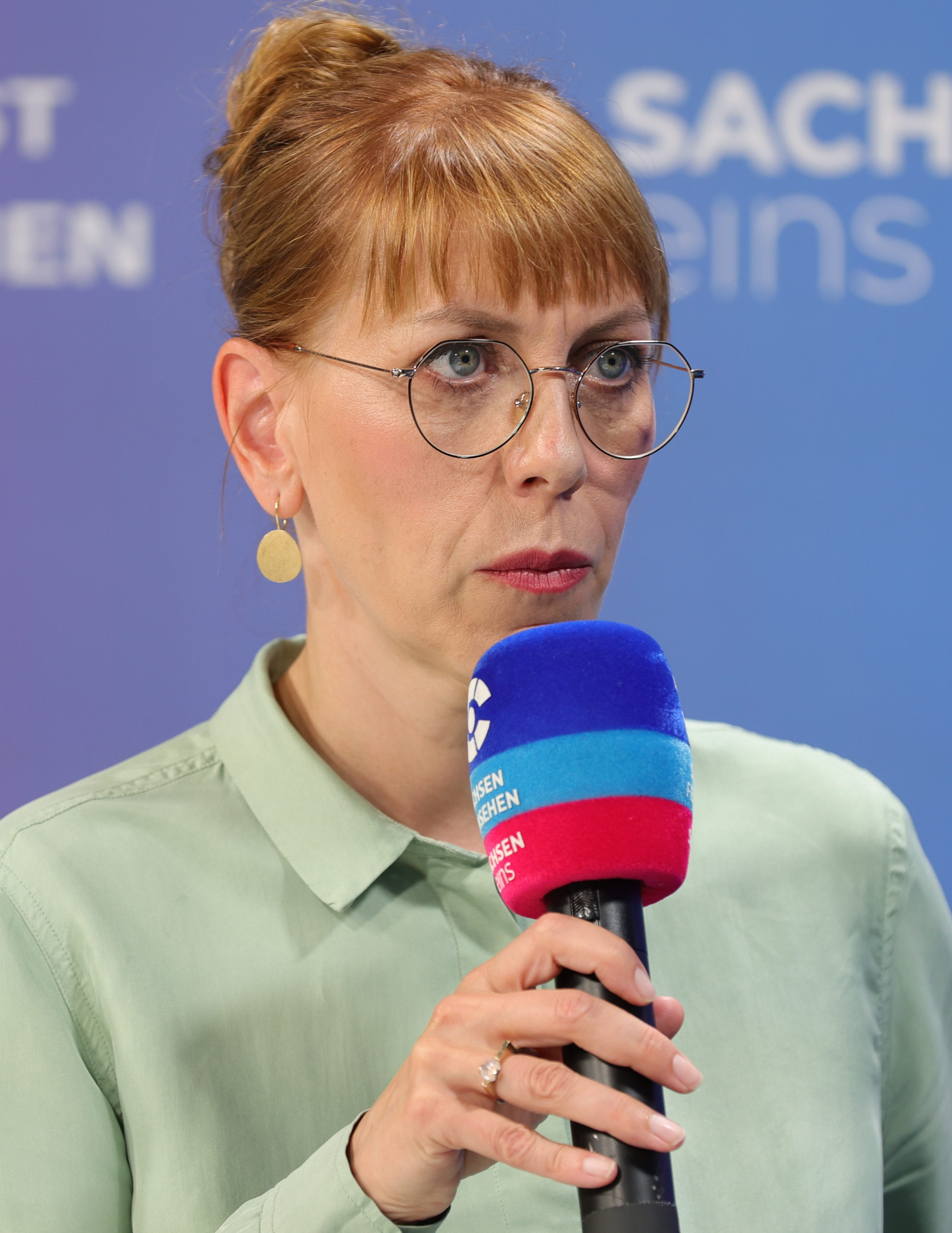

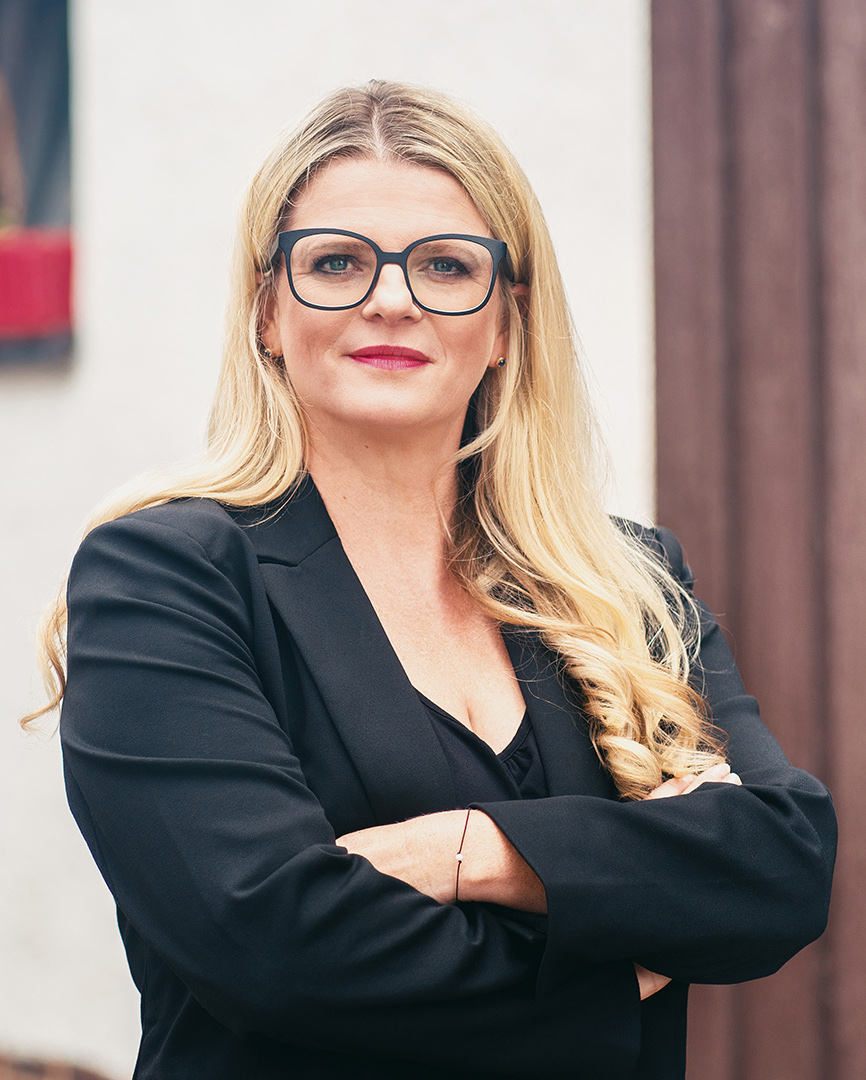

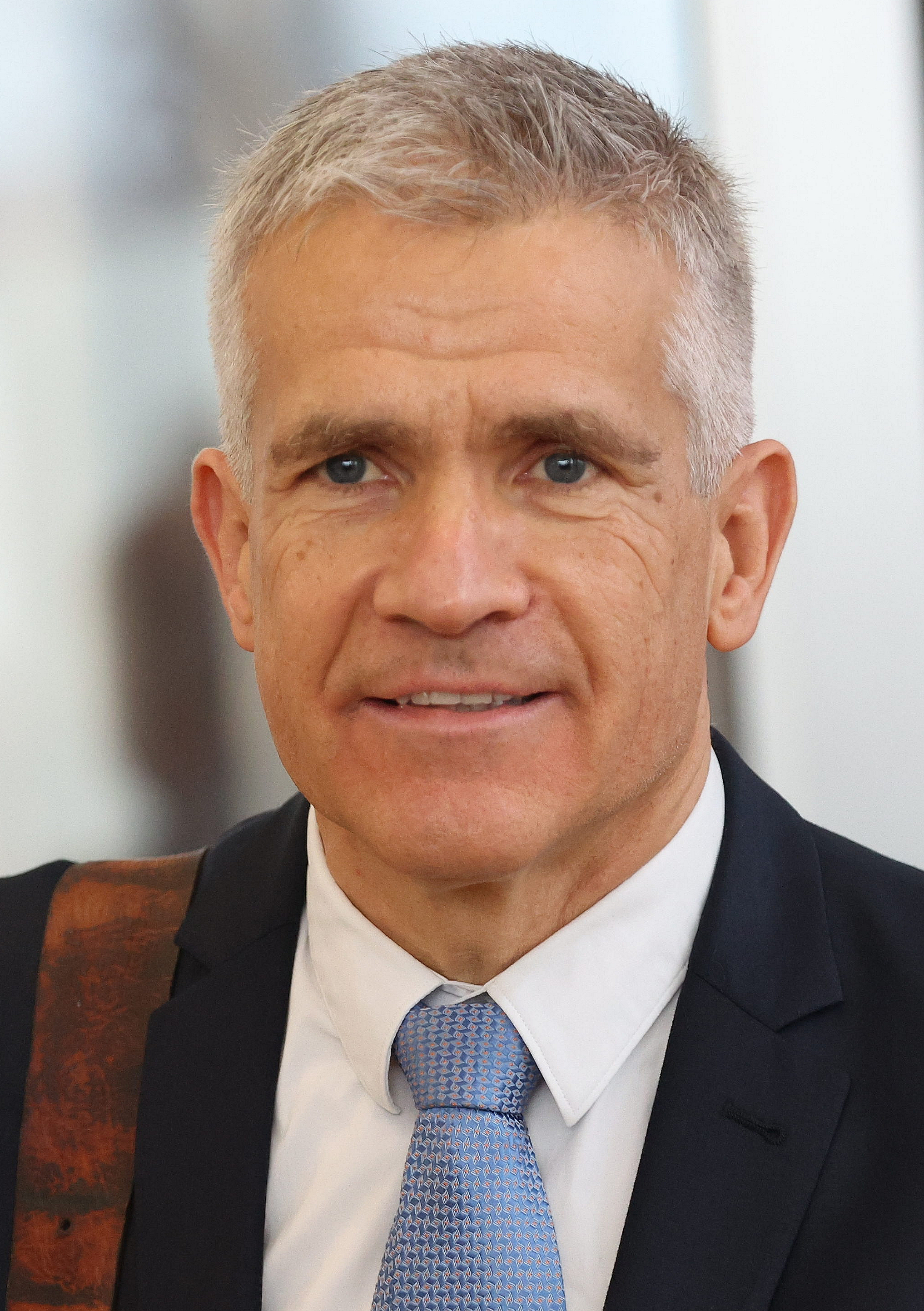
	First party	Second party	Third party
Leader	Michael Kretschmer	Jörg Urban	Sabine Zimmermann
Party	CDU	AfD	BSW
Last election	45 seats, 32.1%	38 seats, 27.5%	Did not exist
Seats won	41	40	15
Seat change	▼4	▲2	▲15
Popular vote	749,114	719,279	277,568
Percentage	31.9%	30.6%	11.8%
Swing	▼0.2 pp	▲3.1 pp	New party
	Fourth party	Fifth party	Sixth party
Leader	Petra Köpping	Wolfram Günther & Katja Meier	Susanne Schaper
Party	SPD	Greens	Left
Last election	10 seats, 7.7%	12 seats, 8.6%	14 seats, 10.4%
Seats won	10	7	6
Seat change	0	▼5	▼8
Popular vote	172,021	119,980	104,891
Percentage	7.3%	5.1%	4.5%
Swing	▼0.4 pp	▼3.5 pp	▼5.9 pp
	Seventh party
Leader	Matthias Berger
Party	FW
Last election	0 seats, 3.4%
Seats won	1
Seat change	▲1
Popular vote	53,027
Percentage	2.3%
Swing	▼1.1 pp
- Results for the single-member constituencies
Government before election
Kretschmer II
CDU–Greens–SPD
Government after election
Kretschmer III
CDU–SPD

The 2024 Saxony state election was held on 1 September 2024 to elect members to the 8th Landtag of Saxony. It was held on the same day as the 2024 Thuringian state election. Going into the election, the state government was led by Michael Kretschmer of the CDU as Minister-President, in a coalition with the Greens and the SPD.

The CDU remained the largest party with slight losses, followed closely by the Alternative for Germany (AfD) which obtained its best ever result. The SPD remained steady while the Greens fell to just over 5% of the vote; the incumbent coalition lost its majority. The Sahra Wagenknecht Alliance ran for the first time and won 12% and fifteen seats. The Left fell below the 5% electoral threshold but retained its representation in the Landtag after winning two direct constituencies. The Free Voters of Saxony (FW) elected a single member after lead candidate Matthias Berger won the constituency of Leipzig-Land III.

== Background ==
The 2019 election was marked by high gains for the Alternative for Germany (AfD), which gained almost 28 percent of the vote and became the second strongest force. After losses, the CDU ended up with almost 32 percent as the strongest party ahead of the AfD. The Left and the SPD received 10.4 and 7.7 percent of the vote, respectively. The Greens increased and achieved their best result in a state election in Saxony with 8.6 percent, the Free Democratic Party (FDP) again missed entering parliament with 4.5 percent.

== Parties and lists ==
Party	2019 result	Con. candidates	List candidates	Lead candidate
Christian Democratic Union (CDU)	32.1%	60	78	Michael Kretschmer
Alternative for Germany (AfD)	27.5%	60	75	Jörg Urban
The Left (LINKE)	10.4%	60	47	Susanne Schaper
Alliance 90/The Greens (GRÜNE)	8.6%	60	30	Katja Meier
Social Democratic Party (SPD)	7.7%	60	54	Petra Köpping
Free Democratic Party (FDP)	4.5%	60	48	Robert Malorny
Free Voters of Saxony (FW)	3.4%	59	33	Matthias Berger
Die PARTEI	1.6%	3	9	Sabine Kuechler
Pirate Party Germany (PIRATEN)	0.3%	–	9	Stephanie Henkel
Ecological Democratic Party (ÖDP)	0.3%	2	11	Jonas Bialon
Civil Rights Movement Solidarity (BüSo)	0.1%	4	12	Michael Gründler
Bündnis Sahra Wagenknecht (BSW)	–	39	30	Sabine Zimmermann
Free Saxons (FS)	–	35	30	Martin Kohlmann
Values Union (WU)	–	5	7	Heiko Petzold
Alliance Germany (BD)	–	3	16	Steffen Grosse
Grassroots Democratic Party (dieBasis)	–	3	11	David Murcek
Alliance C – Christians for Germany (Bündnis C)	–	–	7	Thomas Lamowski
V-Partei^{3}	–	–	4	Simone Schwarzbach
Action Party for Animal Welfare (Tierschutz hier!)	–	–	3	Uwe Werner
Other	–	13	–	

== Opinion polls ==
=== Graphical summary ===
Local regression of polls conducted.

=== Party polling ===
Polling firm	Fieldwork date	Sample size	CDU	AfD	Linke	Grüne	SPD	FDP	FW	BSW	Others	Lead
2024 state election	1 Sep 2024	–	31.9	30.6	4.5	5.1	7.3	0.9	2.3	11.8	5.6	1.3
Wahlkreisprognose	26–31 Aug 2024	1,000	33	31	3	5.5	6	–	–	13.5	8	2
Forsa	27–29 Aug 2024	1,012	33	31	3	6	7	–	–	12	8	2
Forschungsgruppe Wahlen	26–29 Aug 2024	1,973	33	30	4	6	6	–	–	12	9	3
INSA	19–23 Aug 2024	1,000	30	32	4	5	6	–	3	15	5	2
Forschungsgruppe Wahlen	19–22 Aug 2024	1,028	33	30	4	6	7	–	–	11	9	3
Infratest dimap	19–21 Aug 2024	1,566	31	30	4	6	7	–	–	14	8	1
Wahlkreisprognose	10–18 Aug 2024	1,000	34.5	30	4.5	4.5	5	1	–	14	6.5	4.5
Forsa	7–14 Aug 2024	1,041	33	30	3	6	6	–	–	13	9	3
INSA	5–12 Aug 2024	1,500	29	32	5	5	5	2	4	15	3	3
Forschungsgruppe Wahlen	5–8 Aug 2024	1,003	34	30	4	6	6	–	–	11	9	4
Infratest dimap	12–18 Jun 2024	1,157	29	30	3	7	7	–	–	15	9	1
INSA	10–17 Jun 2024	1,500	30	32	4	5	5	2	–	15	7	2
2024 EP election	9 Jun 2024	–	21.8	31.8	4.9	5.9	6.9	2.4	2.4	12.6	11.3	10
Civey	19 Mar – 2 Apr 2024	3,002	31	30	5	6	6	3	–	10	9	1
INSA	11–18 Mar 2024	1,000	30	34	5	5	6	2	3	11	4	4
Wahlkreisprognose	6–15 Mar 2024	1,200	31.5	31	3	6.5	6	1.5	–	13.5	7	0.5
Infratest dimap	18–23 Jan 2024	1,177	30	35	4	7	7	–	–	8	9	5
Forsa	7–10 Jan 2024	1,507	30	34	6	8	7	3	3	4	8	4
Wahlkreisprognose	2–9 Jan 2024	970	33.5	32	8.5	7	6	2.5	–	–	10	1.5
Wahlkreisprognose	2–9 Jan 2024	970	30.5	28.5	6	5.5	5.5	2	–	15.5	6.5	2
Civey	18 Dec – 1 Jan 2024	3,004	33	37	8	7	3	1	–	–	11	4
Civey	19 Nov – 3 Dec 2023	3,002	33	33	7	7	7	2	3	–	8	Tie
Wahlkreisprognose	31 Oct – 7 Nov 2023	1,173	28.5	32.5	7.5	5.5	8.5	4	–	–	13.5	4
Wahlkreisprognose	31 Oct – 7 Nov 2023	1,173	27.5	31	4.5	5.5	6	–	–	14.5	11	3.5
INSA	11–22 Aug 2023	1,500	29	35	9	6	7	5	–	–	9	6
Wahlkreisprognose	8–12 Jun 2023	1,558	30	32.5	9	7	10	5	–	–	6.5	2.5
Wahlkreisprognose	16–28 May 2023	987	31	32	9.5	7	9.5	4	–	–	7	1
Wahlkreisprognose	18–20 Dec 2022	1,020	29.5	31	8	9.5	10.5	3.5	–	–	8	1.5
Wahlkreisprognose	17–19 Sep 2022	1,000	34	30	10	7	7	3	–	–	9	4
Wahlkreisprognose	9–15 Jun 2022	1,204	35	28	7.5	9.5	9	3	–	–	8	7
Wahlkreisprognose	9–16 May 2022	1,023	33	27	5.5	9.5	12	4	–	–	9	6
INSA	1–6 Apr 2022	1,000	25	28	9	9	12	7	3	–	7	3
Wahlkreisprognose	26 Mar – 1 Apr 2022	1,100	29	26.5	6	9	15	5	–	–	9.5	2.5
Infratest dimap	17–22 Feb 2022	1,178	27	24	10	8	13	7	3	–	8	3
Wahlkreisprognose	5–12 Oct 2021	1,002	22	25.5	7	9	19	10	–	–	7.5	3.5
2021 federal election	26 Sep 2021	–	17.2	24.6	9.3	8.6	19.3	11.0	2.3	–	7.7	5.3
INSA	6–13 Sep 2021	1,000	31	26	11	7	11	8	–	–	6	5
Infratest dimap	13–18 Aug 2021	1,179	35	21	10	7	11	6	4	–	6	14
INSA	2–9 Aug 2021	1,001	34	25	13	7	8	8	–	–	5	9
INSA	18–25 May 2021	1,000	24	26	11	13	6	12	–	–	8	2
Wahlkreisprognose	9–17 Dec 2020	–	40	30	9.5	8	7	1.5	–	–	4	10
INSA	1–15 Dec 2020	1,008	34	26	11	10	7	5	–	–	7	8
Wahlkreisprognose	25 Aug – 3 Sep 2020	–	38	27.5	10	10.5	5	3	2	–	4	10.5
INSA	29 Jun – 2 Jul 2020	1,020	36	26	11	10	7	4	–	–	6	10
Wahlkreisprognose	2–9 Jun 2020	–	40	26	8.5	9.5	6	3	1	–	6	14
Wahlkreisprognose	1–5 Apr 2020	–	36.5	29	9	7.5	7.5	4	1.5	–	5	7.5
2019 state election	1 Sep 2019	–	32.1	27.5	10.4	8.6	7.7	4.5	3.4	–	5.8	4.6

=== Minister-President polling ===
Polling firm	Fieldwork date	Sample size								None/ Unsure	Lead
Polling firm	Fieldwork date	Sample size	Kretschmer CDU	Urban AfD	Chrupalla AfD	Gebhardt Linke	Günther Grüne	Dulig SPD	Zimmermann BSW	None/ Unsure	Lead
Forschungsgruppe Wahlen	26–29 Aug 2024	1,973	70	15	–	–	–	–	–	15	55
INSA	19–23 Aug 2024	1,000	45	18	–	–	–	–	–	37	27
Forschungsgruppe Wahlen	19–22 Aug 2024	1,028	68	13	–	–	–	–	–	19	55
Infratest dimap	19–21 Aug 2024	1,566	58	20	–	–	–	–	–	22	38
Forsa	7–14 Aug 2024	1,041	50	14	–	–	–	–	2	34	36
Forschungsgruppe Wahlen	5–8 Aug 2024	1,003	64	14	–	–	–	–	–	22	50
Infratest dimap	12–18 Jun 2024	1,157	58	17	–	–	–	–	–	25	41
Wahlkreisprognose	2–9 Jan 2024	970	56	23	–	–	–	–	–	21	33
Wahlkreisprognose	2–9 Jan 2024	970	56	–	29	–	–	–	–	15	27
Wahlkreisprognose	31 Oct – 7 Nov 2023	1,173	57	26	–	–	–	–	–	17	31
Wahlkreisprognose	8–12 Jun 2023	1,558	45	21	–	–	–	–	–	34	24
Wahlkreisprognose	18–20 Dec 2022	1,020	39	24	–	4	3	9	–	21	15

== Results ==
Party	Party-list			Constituency			Total seats	+/–
Party	Votes	%	Seats	Votes	%	Seats	Total seats	+/–
Christian Democratic Union	749,114	31.90	14	805,257	34.43	27	41	▼3
Alternative for Germany	719,279	30.63	12	794,223	33.96	28	40	▲3
Bündnis Sahra Wagenknecht	277,568	11.82	15	148,361	6.34	0	15	New
Social Democratic Party	172,021	7.33	10	144,425	6.18	0	10	▼1
Alliance 90/The Greens	119,980	5.11	5	119,033	5.09	2	7	▼6
The Left	104,891	4.47	4	149,124	6.38	2	6	▼8
Free Voters	53,027	2.26	0	113,062	4.83	1	1	▲1
Free Saxons	52,100	2.22	0	12,693	0.54	0	0	0
Action Party for Animal Welfare	23,606	1.01	0				0	0
Free Democratic Party	20,995	0.89	0	33,650	1.44	0	0	0
Die PARTEI	19,752	0.84	0	2,606	0.11	0	0	0
Pirate Party	6,772	0.29	0				0	0
Bündnis Deutschland	6,718	0.29	0	972	0.04	0	0	New
Values Union	6,474	0.28	0	1,818	0.08	0	0	New
Grassroots Democratic Party of Germany	4,486	0.19	0	702	0.03	0	0	New
Alliance C	4,370	0.19	0				0	0
V-Partei3	3,283	0.14	0				0	0
Ecological Democratic Party	1,955	0.08	0	321	0.01	0	0	0
Civil Rights Movement Solidarity	1,582	0.07	0	752	0.03	0	0	0
Team Zastrow				6,988	0.30	0	0	0
Solutions for our region				2,152	0.09	0	0	0
Party of Progress				249	0.01	0	0	0
We Are Leipzig				382	0.02	0	0	0
Independents				2,040	0.09	0	0	0
Total	2,347,973	100.00	60	2,338,810	100.00	60	120	–
Valid votes	2,347,973	99.17		2,338,810	98.78			
Invalid/blank votes	19,634	0.83		28,797	1.22			
Total votes	2,367,607	100.00		2,367,607	100.00			
Registered voters/turnout	3,182,683	74.39		3,182,683	74.39			
Source: wahlen.sachsen.de

AfD vote

CDU vote

BSW vote

Linke vote

SPD vote

Green vote

=== Electorate ===
Demographic	CDU	AfD	Linke	Grüne	SPD	BSW
Total vote	31.9%	30.6%	4.5%	5.1%	7.3%	11.8%
Sex
Men	29%	35%	4%	5%	7%	11%
Women	34%	26%	5%	5%	8%	13%
Age
16–24 years old	18%	31%	13%	8%	7%	10%
25–34 years old	18%	28%	11%	10%	9%	9%
35–44 years old	26%	31%	5%	8%	8%	11%
45–59 years old	33%	33%	2%	5%	6%	11%
60–69 years old	38%	34%	2%	2%	6%	13%
70 and older	45%	24%	2%	1%	8%	15%
Employment status
Self-employed	25%	35%	6%	6%	7%	8%
Employees	29%	28%	5%	7%	8%	12%
Workers	23%	45%	3%	3%	3%	11%
Pensioners	45%	28%	2%	1%	8%	13%
Education
Simple education	28%	45%	3%	1%	5%	10%
Medium education	30%	39%	2%	2%	5%	13%
High education	34%	19%	8%	10%	11%	10%
Urban structure
Large cities	28%	21%	10%	11%	11%	11%
Small municipalities	34%	36%	2%	2%	5%	12%
Population change of district
Shrinking rapidly	33.8%	35.8%	2.2%	1.7%	4.8%	12.9%
Growing	30.5%	25.9%	6.5%	7.9%	9.3%	11.2%
Source: Infratest dimap

== Aftermath ==
The first announcement of the seat distribution, which was early in the morning of 2 September, showed 42 seats for CDU, 41 for AfD, 9 for SPD, and 6 for the Greens. Later in the morning, the state electoral committee announced there had been an error in calculating the seat distribution: one seat was deducted from CDU's and AfD's blocs, and one seat was added to SPD's and Greens' blocs. The committee blamed a software bug that resulted in the 117th through 120th seats being allocated incorrectly. External observers initially speculated that the seat distribution was mistakenly calculated with the D'Hondt method, even though the Sainte-Laguë method was to replace it beginning with this election; administrators denied this and stated it was a coincidence that the incorrect seat distribution matched the D'Hondt method's result. Notably, the loss of this one seat denied AfD a Sperrminorität ("blocking minority") that would have given it veto power over certain parliamentary actions requiring a two-thirds supermajority, such as judicial appointments and constitutional amendments, even if it is not in government.

Saxony has a version of the Grundmandatsklausel ("basic mandate clause") that is present in federal elections, which grants full proportional seating to parties that win two constituency seats even if they do not reach the electoral threshold of 5% of party-list votes. This enabled Die Linke, which received only 4.5% of party-list votes, to win list seats and receive representation in parliament proportionate to its vote share.

=== Electoral fraud investigation ===
The State Criminal Police Office prosecuted a case of electoral fraud, in which 111 mail ballots in Dresden, 14 in Radeberg, and one in Dohna had their actual votes pasted over and replaced with votes for the right-wing extremist Free Saxony. Initial suspicions were raised after the postal voting district Langebrück-2/Schönborn in Dresden returned an unusually high result of 10.2% of votes for the party, which polled around 2% or less nearly everywhere else in the state. The Dresden and Bautzen electoral committees invalidated all of the modified ballots in their final canvasses of the results on 5 September. The state electoral committee decided this was sufficient and took no further action in its final canvass on 13 September.

Experts from TU Dresden later noticed the neighboring postal voting district Langebrück-1 had returned a similarly unusual figure of 13.4% in June 2024 local elections. Police confirmed that 154 manipulated postal ballots from that election were discovered. Michael Schleinitz, a 44-year-old Free Saxony member from Langebrück who was elected to its district council because of the modified ballots, was suspected of both cases. On 28 October, Schleinitz was arrested for electoral fraud and two unrelated charges of attempted arson against shelters for asylum seekers. In June 2025, he confessed to all charges before the court and was sentenced to four years and three months in prison.

=== Government formation ===
After the elections in both Thuringia and Saxony, Sahra Wagenknecht, leader of the BSW, stated her preferences to go into a coalition with either the CDU and/or the SPD in an interview with ARD.

Though a right-wing CDU-AfD coalition would have a majority, the national CDU has prohibited any state faction from working with that party. Because of this, the only possible majority coalition was between the CDU, BSW and SPD, also known as the "blackberry coalition".

Kretschmer met with Wagenknecht on 9 September "to explore possibilities for constructive political cooperation", with an eye toward beginning negotiations with BSW on the state level. Federal CDU leader Friedrich Merz appealed to nervous party members to trust Kretschmer and Mario Voigt in their respective negotiations, but reiterated that the party would refuse any cooperation or even discussions with AfD. Kretschmer admitted successful government formation would be a "major challenge" but repeatedly ruled out a minority government.

In a speech on 20 September, Merz described a potential coalition including BSW in either Saxony or Thuringia as "very, very, very unlikely", though with a stated goal of keeping AfD out of the Minister-President's office, he did not rule out other forms of cooperation with the party. Exploratory talks between CDU, BSW and SPD began on 23 September.

On 17 October, the three parties produced a report on the exploratory talks concluding that "constructive and solution-oriented cooperation for Saxony is possible". The parties' state executive committees will meet to vote on approving further negotiations in the following days. On 25 October, SPD suspended its participation in protest of several BSW MdLs voting with AfD to establish a parliamentary inquiry committee into the state government's handling of the COVID-19 pandemic; they were resumed the following week after discussions among the parties' leadership.

On 5 November, BSW left the talks permanently and declared they had failed, citing that the parties had irreconcilable differences on the topics of state finances, migration and the War in Ukraine. The only possible remaining government was a CDU-led minority government or coalition, though Kretschmer repeatedly ruled it out. If a Minister-President is not elected in four months after the first sitting of the Landtag (a deadline of 1 February 2025), the state constitution requires a dissolution of the Landtag and new elections.

Despite Kretschmer's previous statements, CDU and SPD leaders announced on 15 November they had begun negotiations toward forming a minority coalition. Kretschmer stated there would be a "consultation process" with the other parties, including AfD, before any legislation is introduced to ensure it has enough support to pass. BSW placed a commitment to halting cuts in social welfare spending and a harder policy toward illegal migration as conditions of supporting the government.

On 4 December, CDU and SPD announced they had completed a coalition agreement. The minority coalition has 51 seats, 10 short of a majority. The agreement was ratified by both parties and signed on 17 December.

The path to enough support for re-electing Kretschmer as Minister-President is unclear; The Left also conditioned it on reversing social-spending cuts, while the Greens categorically ruled it out after he sharply attacked them during the campaign. AfD stated they would only support a minority government if it were CDU alone.

=== Minister-President election ===
The state constitution requires an absolute majority (61 of 120) for any Minister-President candidate on the first ballot. Any member may nominate a candidate. If no candidate succeeds, a second and final ballot is held where the candidate with the plurality of votes is elected. The election was scheduled for 18 December.

AfD leader Jörg Urban stood as a Minister-President candidate. Matthias Berger, the Free Voters leader who sits as an independent, also stood for election and proposed a technocratic government.

To prevent a potential repeat of the "Kemmerich moment", which prompted the 2020 Thuringian government crisis after he was elected Minister-President with unexpected AfD votes, the Greens proposed changing the rules to allow an explicit "against all" vote on the second ballot. The current rules provide yes or no options only when there is one candidate. If there are multiple candidates, members must vote for one of them or abstain. This proposal was made before both ballots and voted down both times.

Minister-President election
Ballot →	First	Second
Required majority →	61 out of 120	Plurality
Matthias Berger	6 / 120	39 / 120
Michael Kretschmer	55 / 120	69 / 120
Jörg Urban	40 / 120	1 / 120
Abstain/invalid	19 / 120	11 / 120
