= Eisenach – Wartburgkreis – Unstrut-Hainich-Kreis =

Federal electoral district of Germany

189 Eisenach – Wartburgkreis – Unstrut-Hainich-Kreis
- Electoral district for the Bundestag
- Eisenach – Wartburgkreis – Unstrut-Hainich-Kreis in 2025
- State: Thuringia
- Population: 263,500 (2019)
- Electorate: 212,267 (2021)
- Major settlements: Eisenach; Mühlhausen; Bad Salzungen
- Area: 2,350.8 km^{2}

Current electoral district
- Created: 1990
- Party: AfD
- Member: Stefan Möller
- Elected: 2025

Eisenach – Wartburgkreis – Unstrut-Hainich-Kreis is an electoral constituency (German: Wahlkreis) represented in the Bundestag. It elects one member via first-past-the-post voting. Under the current constituency numbering system, it is designated as constituency 189. It is located in western Thuringia, comprising the city of Eisenach and the districts of Wartburgkreis and Unstrut-Hainich-Kreis.

Eisenach – Wartburgkreis – Unstrut-Hainich-Kreis was created for the inaugural 1990 federal election after German reunification. From 2021 to 2025, it was represented by Klaus Stöber of the Alternative for Germany (AfD). Since 2025 it has been represented by Stefan Möller of the AfD.

== Geography ==
Eisenach – Wartburgkreis – Unstrut-Hainich-Kreis is located in western Thuringia. As of the 2025 federal election, it comprises the independent city of Eisenach and the districts of Wartburgkreis and Unstrut-Hainich-Kreis.

== History ==
Eisenach – Wartburgkreis – Unstrut-Hainich-Kreis was created after German reunification in 1990, then known as Eisenach – Mühlhausen. In the 2002 election, it was named Eisenach – Wartburgkreis – Unstrut-Hainich-Kreis I. In the 2005 through 2013 elections, it was named Eisenach – Wartburgkreis – Unstrut-Hainich-Kreis II. It acquired its current name in the 2017 election. In the 1990 through 1998 elections, it was constituency 297 in the numbering system. In the 2002 and 2005 elections, it was number 191. In the 2009 through 2021 elections, it was number 190. From the 2025 election, it has been number 189.

Originally, the constituency comprised the districts of Eisenach and Mühlhausen. In the 2002 election, it comprised the city of Eisenach, the district of Wartburgkreis, and the municipalities of Bad Langensalza, Heyerode, and Katharinenberg and the Verwaltungsgemeinschaften of Unstrut-Hainich and Vogtei from the Unstrut-Hainich-Kreis district. In the 2005 through 2013 elections, it gained of the municipalities of Menteroda and Weinbergen and the Verwaltungsgemeinschaften of Bad Tennstedt, Herbsleben, and Schlotheim from the Unstrut-Hainich-Kreis district. It acquired its current borders in the 2017 election.

Election	No.	Name	Borders
1990	297	Eisenach – Mühlhausen	Eisenach district; Mühlhausen district
1994	297	Eisenach – Mühlhausen	Eisenach district; Mühlhausen district
1998	297	Eisenach – Mühlhausen	Eisenach district; Mühlhausen district
2002	191	Eisenach – Wartburgkreis – Unstrut-Hainich-Kreis I	Eisenach city; Wartburgkreis district; Unstrut-Hainich-Kreis district (only Bad Langensalza, Heyerode, and Katharinenberg municipalities and Unstrut-Hainich and Vogtei Verwaltungsgemeinschaften)
2005	191	Eisenach – Wartburgkreis – Unstrut-Hainich-Kreis II	Eisenach city; Wartburgkreis district; Unstrut-Hainich-Kreis district (only Bad Langensalza, Heyerode, Katharinenberg, Menteroda, and Weinbergen municipalities and Bad Tennstedt, Herbsleben, Schlotheim, Unstrut-Hainich and Vogtei Verwaltungsgemeinschaften)
2009	190	Eisenach – Wartburgkreis – Unstrut-Hainich-Kreis II	Eisenach city; Wartburgkreis district; Unstrut-Hainich-Kreis district (only Bad Langensalza, Heyerode, Katharinenberg, Menteroda, and Weinbergen municipalities and Bad Tennstedt, Herbsleben, Schlotheim, Unstrut-Hainich and Vogtei Verwaltungsgemeinschaften)
2013	190	Eisenach – Wartburgkreis – Unstrut-Hainich-Kreis II	Eisenach city; Wartburgkreis district; Unstrut-Hainich-Kreis district (only Bad Langensalza, Heyerode, Katharinenberg, Menteroda, and Weinbergen municipalities and Bad Tennstedt, Herbsleben, Schlotheim, Unstrut-Hainich and Vogtei Verwaltungsgemeinschaften)
2017	190	Eisenach – Wartburgkreis – Unstrut-Hainich-Kreis	Eisenach city; Wartburgkreis district; Unstrut-Hainich-Kreis district
2021	190	Eisenach – Wartburgkreis – Unstrut-Hainich-Kreis	Eisenach city; Wartburgkreis district; Unstrut-Hainich-Kreis district
2025	189	Eisenach – Wartburgkreis – Unstrut-Hainich-Kreis	Eisenach city; Wartburgkreis district; Unstrut-Hainich-Kreis district

== Members ==
The constituency was first represented by Manfred Heise of the Christian Democratic Union (CDU) from 1990 to 1998. Eckhard Ohl won it for the Social Democratic Party (SPD) in 1998 and served a single term. He was succeeded by fellow SPD member Ernst Kranz from 2002 to 2009. Christian Hirte was elected in 2009, and re-elected in 2013 and 2017. He was defeated in 2021 by Klaus Stöber of the Alternative for Germany (AfD).

Election	Member	Party	%
1990	Manfred Heise	CDU	50.6
1994	Manfred Heise	CDU	42.7
1998	Eckhard Ohl	SPD	42.8
2002	Ernst Kranz	SPD	42.6
2005	Ernst Kranz	SPD	35.3
2009	Christian Hirte	CDU	34.8
2013	Christian Hirte	CDU	43.3
2017	Christian Hirte	CDU	34.4
2021	Klaus Stöber	AfD	24.8
2025	Stefan Möller	AfD	38.5

== Election results ==
=== 2025 election ===
Federal election (2025): Eisenach – Wartburgkreis – Unstrut-Hainich-Kreis
Notes:	Blue background denotes the winner of the electorate vote. Pink background denotes a candidate elected from their party list. Yellow background denotes an electorate win by a list member, or other incumbent. A ✓ or ✗ denotes status of any incumbent, win or lose respectively.						
Party	Candidate	Votes	%	±%	Party votes	%	±%
AfD	Stefan Möller	61,093	38.5	▲13.6	64,059	40.4	▲15.8
CDU	Christian Hirte	35,936	22.7	0.0	31,218	19.7	▲1.7
SPD	Tina Rudolph	18,894	11.9	▼12.1	14,825	9.3	▼15.7
Left	Michael Lemm	16,028	10.1	▼1.2	20,761	13.1	▲2.7
BSW	Anke Wirsing	12,823	8.1	New	14,772	9.3	New
Greens	Heike Strecker	3,882	2.4	▼1.1	4,733	3.0	▼1.9
FW	Andreas Böhme	3,768	2.4	▼1.2	2,914	1.8	▼0.7
Independent	Klaus Stöber	3,541	2.2	New			
FDP	Leon Bender	2,345	1.5	▼4.2	4,052	2.6	▼6.0
Volt					676	0.4	▲0.2
BD					430	0.3	New
MLPD	Friedrich Hofmann	338	0.2	▼0.1	264	0.2	0.0
Informal votes		1,305			1,249		
Total valid votes		158,648			158,704		
Turnout		159,953	79.5	▲6.1			
AfD hold	Majority	25,157	15.8	▲15.0			

=== 2021 election ===
Federal election (2021): Eisenach – Wartburgkreis – Unstrut-Hainich-Kreis
Notes:	Blue background denotes the winner of the electorate vote. Pink background denotes a candidate elected from their party list. Yellow background denotes an electorate win by a list member, or other incumbent. A ✓ or ✗ denotes status of any incumbent, win or lose respectively.						
Party	Candidate	Votes	%	±%	Party votes	%	±%
AfD	Klaus Stöber	38,166	24.8	▲3.6	37,737	24.5	▲2.2
SPD	Tina Rudolph	36,729	23.8	▲8.6	38,363	24.9	▲10.5
CDU	✗ Christian Hirte	35,415	23.0	▼11.4	28,249	18.3	▼11.7
Left	Martina Renner	17,216	11.2	▼4.3	15,872	10.3	▼5.4
FDP	Leon Bender	8,869	5.8	▲0.7	13,258	8.6	▲1.4
FW	Andreas Böhme	5,529	3.6	▲0.5	3,882	2.5	▲0.5
Greens	Justus Heuer	5,447	3.5	▲0.4	7,469	4.8	▲1.4
dieBasis	Andreas Wolfschlag	3,007	2.0		2,563	1.7	
Tierschutzpartei					2,226	1.4	
PARTEI	Stephan Hinze	2,502	1.6		1,649	1.1	▼0.1
NPD					624	0.4	▼1.5
Pirates					558	0.4	▼0.1
Menschliche Welt					380	0.2	
Volt					339	0.2	
ÖDP	Peter Schneider	567	0.4		307	0.2	▼0.1
MLPD	Lea Weinmann	431	0.3	▼0.2	298	0.2	0.0
Team Todenhöfer					227	0.1	
Humanists					129	0.1	
LKR	Wladislaw Schel	130	0.1				
V-Partei3					91	0.1	▼0.1
Informal votes		2,105			1,892		
Total valid votes		154,008			154,221		
Turnout		156,113	73.5	▲0.2			
AfD gain from CDU	Majority	1,437	0.8				

=== 2017 election ===
Federal election (2017): Eisenach – Wartburgkreis – Unstrut-Hainich-Kreis
Notes:	Blue background denotes the winner of the electorate vote. Pink background denotes a candidate elected from their party list. Yellow background denotes an electorate win by a list member, or other incumbent. A ✓ or ✗ denotes status of any incumbent, win or lose respectively.						
Party	Candidate	Votes	%	±%	Party votes	%	±%
CDU	✓ Christian Hirte	55,378	34.4	▼9.0	48,340	30.0	▼10.1
AfD	Klaus Stöber	34,052	21.2		35,824	22.3	▲17.2
Left	Sigrid Hupach	24,899	15.5	▼8.0	25,171	15.6	▼6.9
SPD	Michael Klostermann	24,478	15.2	▼3.4	23,206	14.4	▼2.6
FDP	Lars Christian Schröder	8,075	5.0	▲3.4	11,545	7.2	▲4.7
Greens	Andreas Hundertmark	5,066	3.1	▼0.1	5,596	3.5	▼0.6
FW	Andreas Böhme	5,010	3.1	▲0.8	3,185	2.0	▲0.1
NPD	Patrick Wieschke	3,193	2.0	▼2.4	3,019	1.9	▼1.9
PARTEI					1,857	1.2	
BGE					620	0.4	
Pirates					676	0.4	▼1.6
DM					608	0.4	
ÖDP					563	0.3	▼0.2
MLPD	Friedrich Christoph Hofmann	689	0.4		369	0.2	▲0.1
V-Partei³					307	0.2	
Informal votes		2,314			2,268		
Total valid votes		160,840			160,886		
Turnout		163,154	73.3	▲6.2			
CDU hold	Majority	21,326	13.2	▼6.4			

=== 2013 election ===
Federal election (2013): Eisenach – Wartburgkreis – Unstrut-Hainich-Kreis II
Notes:	Blue background denotes the winner of the electorate vote. Pink background denotes a candidate elected from their party list. Yellow background denotes an electorate win by a list member, or other incumbent. A ✓ or ✗ denotes status of any incumbent, win or lose respectively.						
Party	Candidate	Votes	%	±%	Party votes	%	±%
CDU	✓ Christian Hirte	55,220	43.3	▲8.5	51,442	40.2	▲7.6
Left	Anja Müller	30,220	23.7	▼3.9	28,787	22.5	▼5.8
SPD	Michael Klostermann	23,564	18.5	▼4.1	21,731	17.0	▼1.5
AfD					6,307	4.9	
NPD	Patrick Wieschke	5,969	4.7	▲0.9	5,144	4.0	▲0.5
Greens	Rüdiger Bender	4,129	3.2	▼0.6	5,121	4.0	▼1.0
Pirates	Andreas Jacob	3,450	2.7		2,682	2.1	▲0.1
FW	Andreas Böhme	3,113	2.4		2,509	2.0	
FDP	Fred Leise	1,927	1.5	▼4.9	3,123	2.4	▼6.8
ÖDP					616	0.5	▲0.1
REP					254	0.2	▼0.2
MLPD					199	0.2	▼0.1
Informal votes		2,312			1,989		
Total valid votes		127,592			127,915		
Turnout		129,904	67.4	▲2.5			
CDU hold	Majority	25,000	19.6	▲12.4			

=== 2009 election ===
Federal election (2009): Eisenach – Wartburgkreis – Unstrut-Hainich-Kreis II
Notes:	Blue background denotes the winner of the electorate vote. Pink background denotes a candidate elected from their party list. Yellow background denotes an electorate win by a list member, or other incumbent. A ✓ or ✗ denotes status of any incumbent, win or lose respectively.						
Party	Candidate	Votes	%	±%	Party votes	%	±%
CDU	Christian Hirte	44,903	34.8	▲6.1	42,063	32.6	▼6.2
Left	Anja Müller	35,666	27.6	▲5.2	36,508	28.3	▲3.5
SPD	✗ Ernst Kranz	29,106	22.6	▼12.7	23,845	18.5	▼12.8
FDP	Daniel Rudloff	8,211	6.4	▲1.6	11,921	9.2	▲1.7
Greens	Richard Janus	4,921	3.8	▲0.9	6,451	5.0	▲0.7
NPD	Patrick Wieschke	4,864	3.8	▼0.2	4,607	3.6	▼0.2
Pirates					2,516	1.9	
Independent	Klaus Lohfing-Blanke	1,075	0.7				
ÖDP					489	0.4	
REP					467	0.4	▼0.3
Independent	Andreas Grube	317	0.2				
MLPD					268	0.2	▼0.3
Informal votes		1,984			1,912		
Total valid votes		129,063			129,135		
Turnout		131,047	65.0	▼10.1			
CDU gain from SPD	Majority	9,237	7.2				

=== 2005 election ===
Federal election (2005):Eisenach – Wartburgkreis – Unstrut-Hainich-Kreis II
Notes:	Blue background denotes the winner of the electorate vote. Pink background denotes a candidate elected from their party list. Yellow background denotes an electorate win by a list member, or other incumbent. A ✓ or ✗ denotes status of any incumbent, win or lose respectively.						
Party	Candidate	Votes	%	±%	Party votes	%	±%
SPD	✓ Ernst Kranz	53,696	35.3	▼7.5	47,724	31.3	▼10.4
CDU	Christian Hirte	43,695	28.7	▼3.8	40,233	26.4	▼3.7
Left	Rosel Neuhäuser	34,133	22.4	▲6.3	37,711	24.7	▲9.4
FDP	Jürgen Bohn	7,301	4.8	▼0.6	11,506	7.5	▲1.9
NPD	Helmut Eckstein	6,008	3.9		5,727	3.8	▲3.0
Greens	Gisela Rexrodt	4,412	2.9	▼0.3	6,541	4.3	▲0.6
Independent	Fabian Kirschner	2,126	1.4				
GRAUEN					1,166	0.8	▲0.4
REP					1,051	0.7	▼0.1
MLPD	Friedrich Hofmann	789	0.5		774	0.5	
Informal votes		3,206			2,933		
Total valid votes		152,160			152,433		
Turnout		155,366	75.1	▲0.6			
SPD hold	Majority	10,001	6.6				
