= Stefan Möller =

German politician (born 1975)

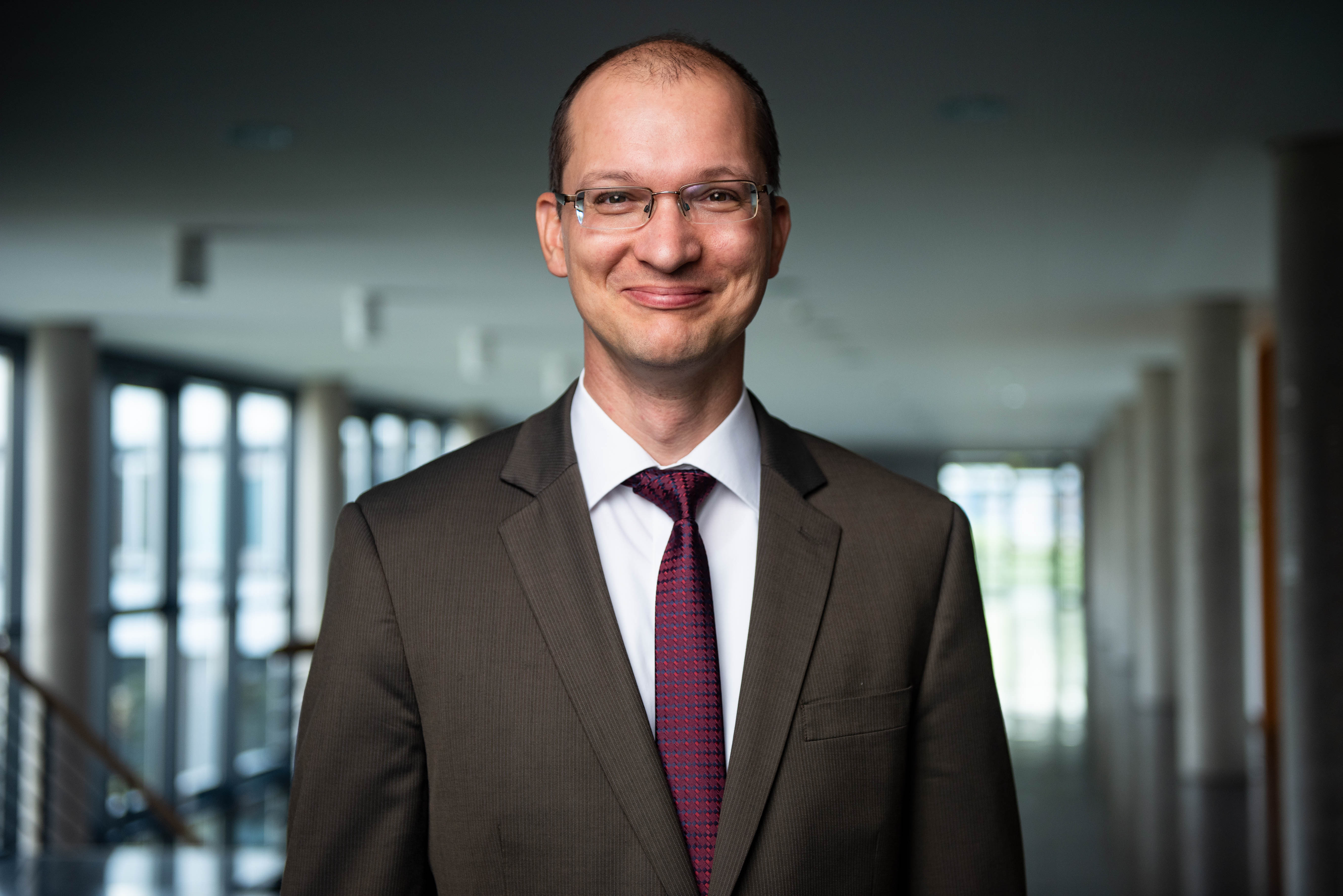
- Möller in 2018

Member of the Bundestag
- Incumbent
- Assumed office March 2025
- Constituency: Thuringia

Personal details
- Born: 23 March 1975 (age 51) Erfurt
- Party: Alternative for Germany

Stefan Möller (born 23 March 1975) is a German politician from Alternative for Germany. Since 2014 he has been one of the two state spokespersons of the AfD Thuringia and a member of the Landtag of Thuringia. Since 2025 he has been a member of Bundestag.

== Life ==
Möller was born in Erfurt and began studying law at the Friedrich Schiller University in Jena in 1994. After completing his legal traineeship, he has been working as a lawyer since 2004 and has had his own law firm in Erfurt since 2007. At the same time, he became corporate lawyer for TEAG Thüringer Energie in 2007.

Möller is married and has two children.

== Political career ==
Möller has been, together with Björn Höcke, one of the two state spokespersons of the AfD Thuringia since 2014. From 2013 to the beginning of 2016 he was also an assessor in the AfD district association of Central Thuringia. In the 2014 Thuringian state election, he entered the Thuringian state parliament via the AfD Thuringia state list. On 22 September 2014, he was elected parliamentary manager of the AfD state parliamentary group. In March 2015, he signed the Erfurter Resolution.

Möller is a member of the Committee for Economics and Science. He is also the AfD parliamentary group's spokesman on energy policy, economic policy and migration policy. From 2015 to November 6, 2017, Möller was a member of the advisory board of the Thuringian Development Bank and the Society for Employment and Economic Development of the Free State of Thuringia mbH. In April 2018, Möller was elected chairman of the Justice Committee in the Thuringian state parliament. The election was preceded by a dispute lasting several months after the previous chairman, Stephan Brandner, moved to the Bundestag; MPs from the SPD, the Left and the Greens accused Möller of a "lack of understanding of the rule of law" and of abusing the rights of parliament with "rules of procedure games".

In the mayoral election in Erfurt on April 15, 2018, Stefan Möller received 14.4 percent of the vote and came in third place.

Along with Björn Höcke, Möller was the co-initiator of the Wednesday demonstrations of the Thuringian regional association of the AfD.

=== Federal parliament ===
In the 2025 federal election, Möller is running in the federal electoral district of Eisenach – Wartburgkreis – Unstrut-Hainich-Kreis and in second place on the AfD state list. He will be one of eight AfD MP from Thuringia, which bringing the völkisch ideology of Björn Höcke in the parliament. "There is also significantly more Björn Höcke in the new AfD faction." (Süddeutsche Zeitung)
