= André Poggenburg =

German politician (born 1975)

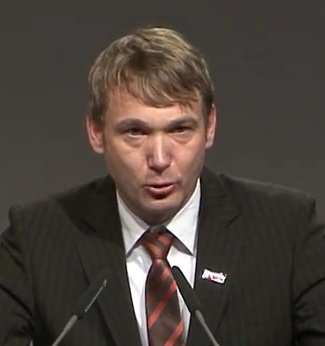
- Poggenburg in 2015

Leader of Awakening of German Patriots
- In office 2019–2019
- Preceded by: Position established
- Succeeded by: Benjamin Przybylla

Leader of Alternative for Germany in Saxony-Anhalt
- In office 2014–2018
- Preceded by: Position established
- Succeeded by: Oliver Kirchner

Member of the Landtag of Saxony-Anhalt for the 41st district (Zeitz)
- In office 2016–2021
- Prime Minister: Reiner Haseloff
- Preceded by: Arnd Czapek
- Succeeded by: Lothar Waehler

Personal details
- Born: March 12, 1975 (age 51) Weißenfels, Bezirk Halle, East Germany
- Party: Alternative for Germany (2013-2019); Awakening of German Patriots - Central Germany (2019); Independent (2019-2024); Freie Sachsen (2024-present)

André Poggenburg is a German politician and former member of the Alternative for Germany (AfD) party. He was state chairman of the party in the federal state of Saxony-Anhalt and was leading candidate for the 2016 Saxony-Anhalt state elections. In 2018 he was forced to resign after making derogatory comments on German Turks. In spite of this, he remained a member of the AfD federal board until January 2019 when he left to form his own, further-right party; the Awakening of German Patriots (AdPM).

== Early life ==
Poggenburg was born in Weißenfels in the Bezirk Halle of East Germany in 1975. He graduated secondary school in 1991 and operated his own car radiator repair business from 1994 to 2015, closing the shop to pursue politics. By 2009 was a Vessel and Apparatus builder. He lost his right thumb in an industrial accident. Poggenburg would be affiliated with the Pegida movement since their early years.

According to the business credit agency Creditreform he had been issued seven threats of imprisonment over unpaid bills and sources close to him stated he only got into politics due to the 5,600 Euro stipend allotted to members of the state Landtag which would make him financially solvent again. According to Poggenburg, these reports were "strongly exaggerated".

== Political career ==
=== Alternative for Germany ===
In 2013 Poggenburg joined Alternative for Germany (AfD), working as the District Chairman for the party in Burgenlandkreis. He said he joined the AfD due to the Euro area crisis and because of German bailouts of other eurozone states. From 2014 to 2018 he was the State Chairman for the AfD in Saxony-Anhalt and from 2015 to 2019 he was on the AfD's Federal Executive Board. He maintained a strong personal hold over the state branch of the party, adopted a Volkish line, and co-founded the Flügel faction with Björn Höcke, the party leader in Thuringia. However, he has described himself as a "national conservative".

He was elected to the Landtag of Saxony-Anhalt in 2016. This election was an immense success for the AfD, going from non-existent to the second largest party in the Landtag with 24.3% of the vote, with this success being credited directly to Poggenburg's leadership by Deutschlandfunk. He championed himself as a "non-academic" and was opposed to increased asylum seekers entering Germany while Saxony-Anhalt saw high homeless rates. Reuters named him one of the four faces of the AfD after this success, alongside Uwe Junge, Joerg Meuthen, and Frauke Petry. In the regional Landtag he served as the chairman of the AfD parliamentary group from 2016 to 2018. During this time he served as the chairman of the commission of inquiry into "Left-Wing Extremism in Saxony-Anhalt."

He was highly criticized in the social and broadcast media for prematurely blaming Merkel's open refugee policy for the 2016 Munich shooting perpetrated by Iranian-German Ali Sonboly. The shooter's motive was ultimately ascertained as enacting revenge on his classmates for bullying.

In 2017 Poggenburg was reprimanded by the AfD for responding to WhatsApp comments with "Of course 'Germany belongs to the Germans' and it should remain so" claiming the statement "massively damaged the image of the party" and was "pushing the party towards right-wing radicalism." At the same time his fellow Flügel member Höcke was reprimanded for criticizing the Holocaust Memorial in Berlin and was nearly expelled from the party.

Poggenburg stepped down as State Chairman in 2018 after he gave a speech where he called German Turks "camel drivers" who should return to their "mud huts and polygamy." He claimed that the media was putting words in his mouth and took the statement out of context, but resigned because "The AfD's success is always more important than the individual's success." After posting offensive tweets he would be further disciplined by the AfD in 2019 when the party barred him for running for office for a 2-year period. He would continue to hold his seat in the Landtag until his term expired in 2021 as an Independent.

=== Awakening of German Patriots ===
Shortly after being barred from seeking office with the AfD, Poggenburg left the party entirely in January 2019 to form his own far-right party, Aufbruch der deutschen Patrioten ("Awakening of German Patriots", AdP). He claimed that he felt the AfD no longer represented his political views and would be joined by other dissatisfied members of the Saxony-Anhalt AfD, who were also affiliated with Pegida. The party immediately came under criticism when it announced that it would use a logo which included a blue cornflower, a symbol associated with the anti-Semitic Schoenerer Movement which was also used by banned Austrian Nazis in the 1930s before the Anschluss in 1938 united Austria with Nazi Germany.

After a poor performance in the 2019 Saxony local election where the AdPM only saw 3,948 votes or 0.2% of the electorate, Poggenburg held a vote for the party to dissolve itself and rejoin the AfD, which failed. Afterwards he would resign from the party altogether. He would be succeeded by Benjamin Przybylla as "interim" leader.

=== Freie Sachsen ===
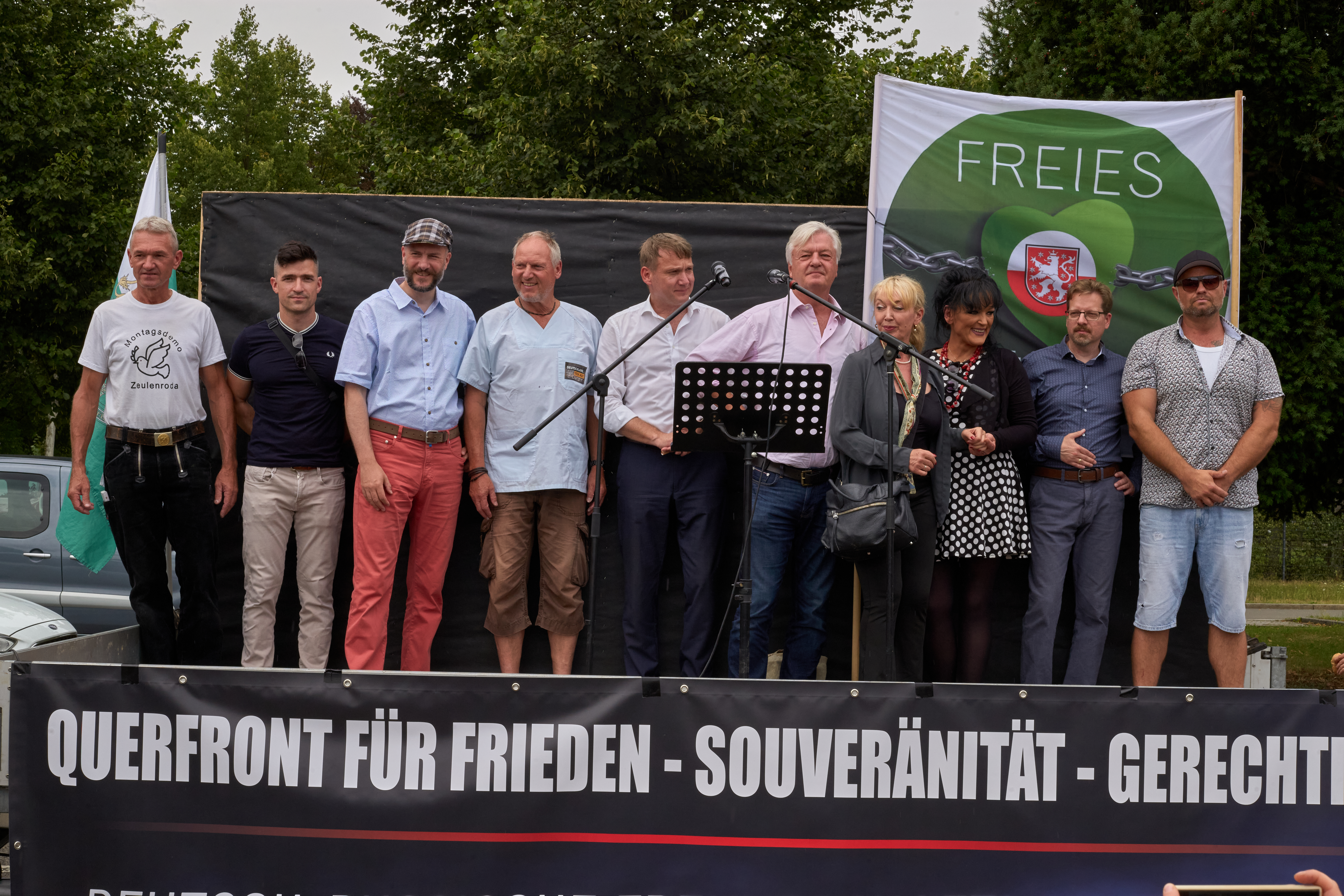
Poggenburg (fifth from left) at a rally for Freie Thüringen 2024

In July 2024 Saxon intelligence reported that Poggenburg was a speaker at two rallies for Freie Sachsen, a small far-right party that supports extensive Saxon autonomy, or outright independence, in Dresden and Chemnitz respectively. By August 2024 Poggenburg openly endorsed Freie Sachsen for the 2024 Saxony state election. Poggenburg hosted a rally later in 2024 for Freie Thüringen, a political movement that seeks to create a similar party in the German state of Thuringia, in Gera that saw numerous far-right politicians attend including Martin Sellner, the leader of the Identitäre Bewegung Österreich, and Jürgen Elsässer, the founder of Compact.

== Personal life ==
Poggenburg is single.
