= Vogtei =

Vogtei may refer to:

- the territory of a Vogt
- Vogtei, Thuringia, a municipality in Thuringia, Germany
- Vogtei (Verwaltungsgemeinschaft), a former local government unit in Thuringia, Germany
