= AfD Thuringia =

- Leader: Björn Höcke and Stefan Möller
- Ideology: Völkisch nationalism; Right-wing populism
- Political position: Far-right
- National affiliation: Alternative for Germany
- Colors: Light blue
- Landtag of Thuringia: 32 / 88

Website
- https://afd-thueringen.de

The AfD Thuringia is the Thuringian state chapter of the far-right party Alternative for Germany (AfD). The state chapter is led by Björn Höcke and Stefan Möller as state chairmen and has been classified as confirmed right-wing extremist by the State Office for the Protection of the Constitution. With Höcke as its lead candidate, the state party first ran in the 2014 state elections and subsequently entered the Thuringian state parliament. In the 2021 federal election, the AfD ran in Thuringia with Stephan Brandner as its lead candidate. Again with Höcke as its lead candidate, the AfD became the second-strongest party in the 2019 state election, entering the state parliament with 22 representatives. In the 2024 state election, again with Björn Höcke as its lead candidate, the Alternative for Germany became the strongest party in a German federal state for the first time.

In March 2021, the AfD Thuringia was classified as "proven right-wing extremist" by the Office for the Protection of the Constitution, which sees it as an "effort against the free democratic basic order."

== History ==
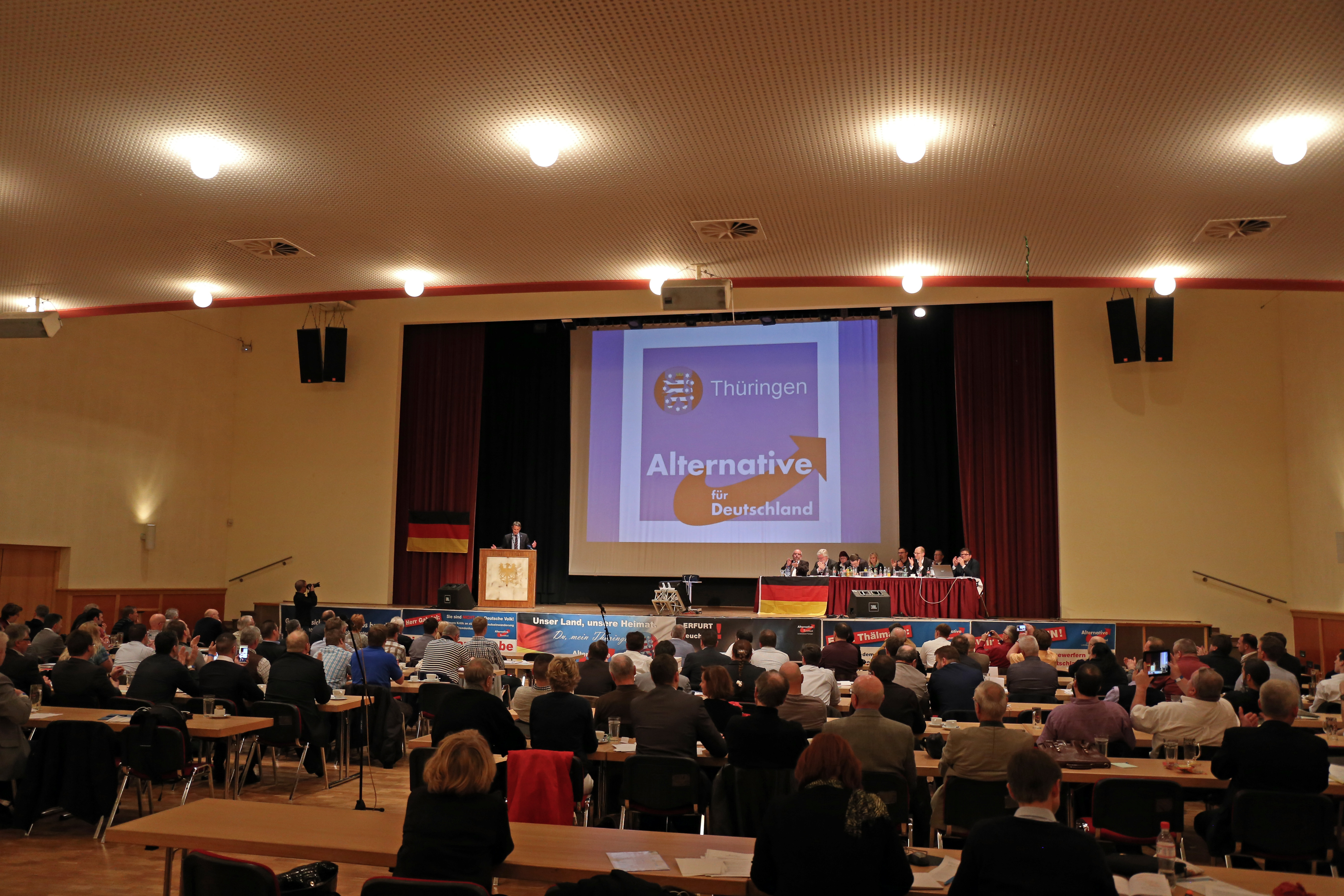
AfD state party conference on 9 April 2016 in Arnstadt

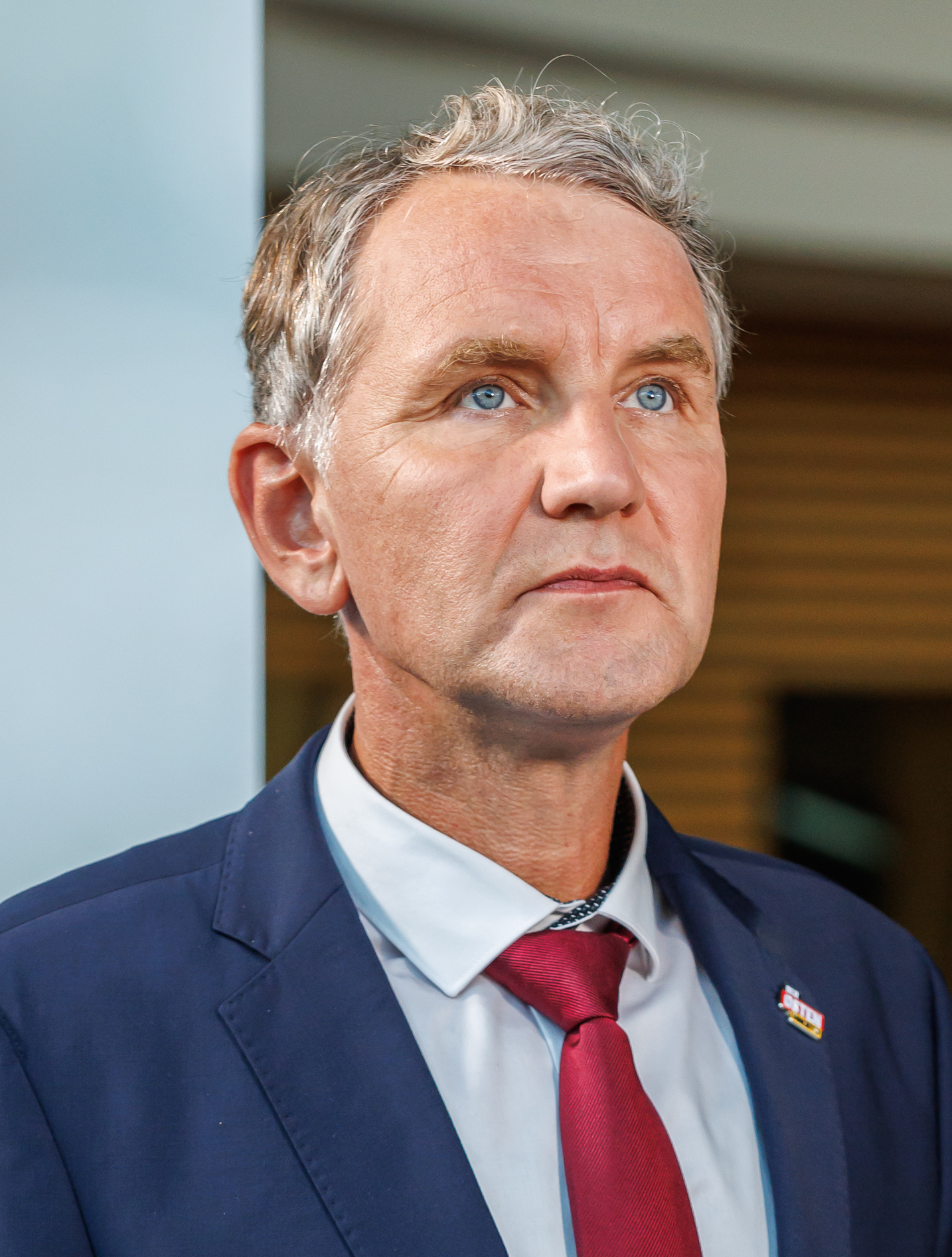
The Thuringian AfD is led by Björn Höcke.

The AfD Thuringia was founded on April 27, 2013, in Herrenhof. The founding of the Ilm-Kreis district association by the controversial AfD member Paul Latussek led to the party distancing itself. The first state chairman, Matthias Wohlfarth, was also accused of right-wing ideology. In 2014, Björn Höcke and Stefan Möller took over the association. In the same year, Sieghardt Rydzewski publicly resigned from the party. Observers were particularly struck by the proximity to the New Right, as Günter Scholdt was a speaker at the regional association. He provided impetus for Höcke's "10 Theses for the Free State of Thuringia", which was considered right-wing populist.

In the 2014 Thuringian state election, the party won 10.6% of the vote in its first participation, gaining seats in the state parliament. It received votes from former voters of the CDU (18,000), Die Linke (16,000), the FDP (11,000), and the Greens (1,000). The election campaign was characterized by a "populist note" on the issue of asylum, according to political scientist Torsten Oppelland. The parliamentary group consisted of eleven members. The parliamentary group executive committee was elected at the constitutive meeting on 22 September 2014. Björn Höcke was elected as parliamentary group leader, with Wiebke Muhsal and Stephan Brandner and parliamentary manager Stefan Möller. Other members of the parliamentary group were Oskar Helmerich, Corinna Herold, Jens Krumpe, Jörg Henke, Olaf Kießling, Thomas Rudy and Siegfried Gentele.

In March 2015, the AfD Thuringia state party conference in Arnstadt adopted the "Erfurt Resolution." On April 15, 2015, the state parliamentary group announced the expulsion of Gentele, who now served as an independent member of the state parliament. In May, Helmerich and Krumpe left the parliamentary group. NacAt the AfD federal party conference in July 2015, at which party leader Bernd Lucke was voted out and subsequently left the AfD, all three MPs left the party. The AfD parliamentary group in the Thuringian Landtag now had eight representatives.

In September 2015, around 5,000 people took part in a demonstration against the asylum policy in Erfurt organized by the AfD Thuringia. Following an appearance by state chairman Höcke on the ARD program "Günther Jauch" on October 18, 2015, the federal executive board distanced itself from him, stating that he was only "authorized to speak for the Thuringia state association, not for the federal party." The "vast majority of AfD members" did not feel represented by his "style of appearance."

In May 2016, research by the Thüringer Allgemeine It was revealed that state parliament members and AfD Thuringia employees had founded an AfD front organization called the Citizens' Alliance for Thuringia in September of the previous year. The organization was founded at the headquarters of the INSA polling institute, owned by Hermann Binkert, who also attended the meeting. The organization was used, for example, to rent a space that the private owner expressly refused to rent to the AfD.

At the beginning of July 2017, the deputy chairwoman of the AfD Thuringia, Steffi Brönner, resigned. She accused the state party of right-wing extremist ideology and of filling key positions with known right-wing extremists. Brönner's resignation was prompted by two concerts planned for July 2017 in Themar with a right-wing extremist background. Bodo Dressel, the mayor of the neighboring municipality of Grimmelshausen, who had resigned from the AfD just days before Brönner's resignation at the end of June 2017, had made his plot of land available for the concert. The AfD Thuringia accused Brönner of resigning out of disappointment over not achieving a place on the party's list for the 2017 German federal election. After the 2017 federal election, Stephan Brandner entered the Bundestag as the state party's top candidate and resigned from his state parliament seat, leaving Klaus Rietschel to take his place in the state parliament. Rietschel, however, left the party and parliamentary group on January 15, 2019; as a result, the parliamentary group shrank to seven members.

In April 2018, the AfD parliamentary group presented a position paper on Leitkultur, identity, and patriotism, which spoke of "peculiarities of the national character" in which "the German soul is expressed" and – according to the literary scholar Heinrich Detering "in a singular that becomes increasingly uncanny upon closer inspection" – "the German way of life".

In November 2020, Björn Höcke was confirmed as AfD state leader at the AfD Thuringia party conference in Pfiffelbach with almost 84 percent of the vote.

On November 30, 2021, the AfD Thuringia regional association accused the Federal Constitutional Court on Facebook of being corrupt and party-aligned, and spoke of "bailiff jurisdiction".

In April 2022, the AfD district association Kyffhäuser-Sömmerda-Weimarer Land anti-Semitically referred to French President Emmanuel Macron as a "Rothschild brat".

In the 2024 Thuringian local elections, the AfD Thuringia supported a voters' group in the Saalfeld-Rudolstadt district, calling itself the Alternative for the Saalfeld-Rudolstadt District (AfL), which ran against the AfD list. This voters' group was founded by opponents of AfD state parliament member Karlheinz Frosch after Höcke allies had only achieved low rankings on the electoral list, led by Frosch. The opponents also argued that 15 list candidates were too few. Frosch filed a lawsuit against their demand for a new list election and won the Gera Regional Court's ruling in March 2024. Höcke unsuccessfully challenged the candidacies three times in court. According to Bild, the voters' group formed as a result of this effort only narrowly exceeded the minimum number of 184 supporting signatures required for a candidacy, with 191, "just in time." The state executive committee, which supported the AfL, initiated expulsion proceedings against nine party members of the Saalfeld-Rudolstadt district association because they had "significantly violated the party's rules in a particularly serious manner and thereby caused serious damage to the party," as stated in a letter to the state arbitration court. Frosch then left the AfD. In the elections, Frosch's official AfD list achieved 18.5 percent and nine seats in the district council, while Höcke's list achieved 13.7 percent and six seats. Thuringia's AfD deputy leader Torben Braga announced a challenge to the election results in the Saalfeld-Rudolstadt district.

In the run-up to the 2024 Thuringian state election, the party sent only a small number of invitations to journalists for its election party. Der Spiegel, Bild, Die Welt, and Die Tageszeitung successfully sought interim legal protection against this. The party then excluded press representatives from the event altogether. In the election, the AfD became the strongest force in a state parliament for the first time, receiving 32.8 percent of the vote.

At the Thuringian AfD state party conference in Arnstadt in mid-December 2024, the chairman of the state association, Björn Höcke, was confirmed in his office by a large majority against his challenger Klaus Stöber.

== Politics ==
=== Party program ===
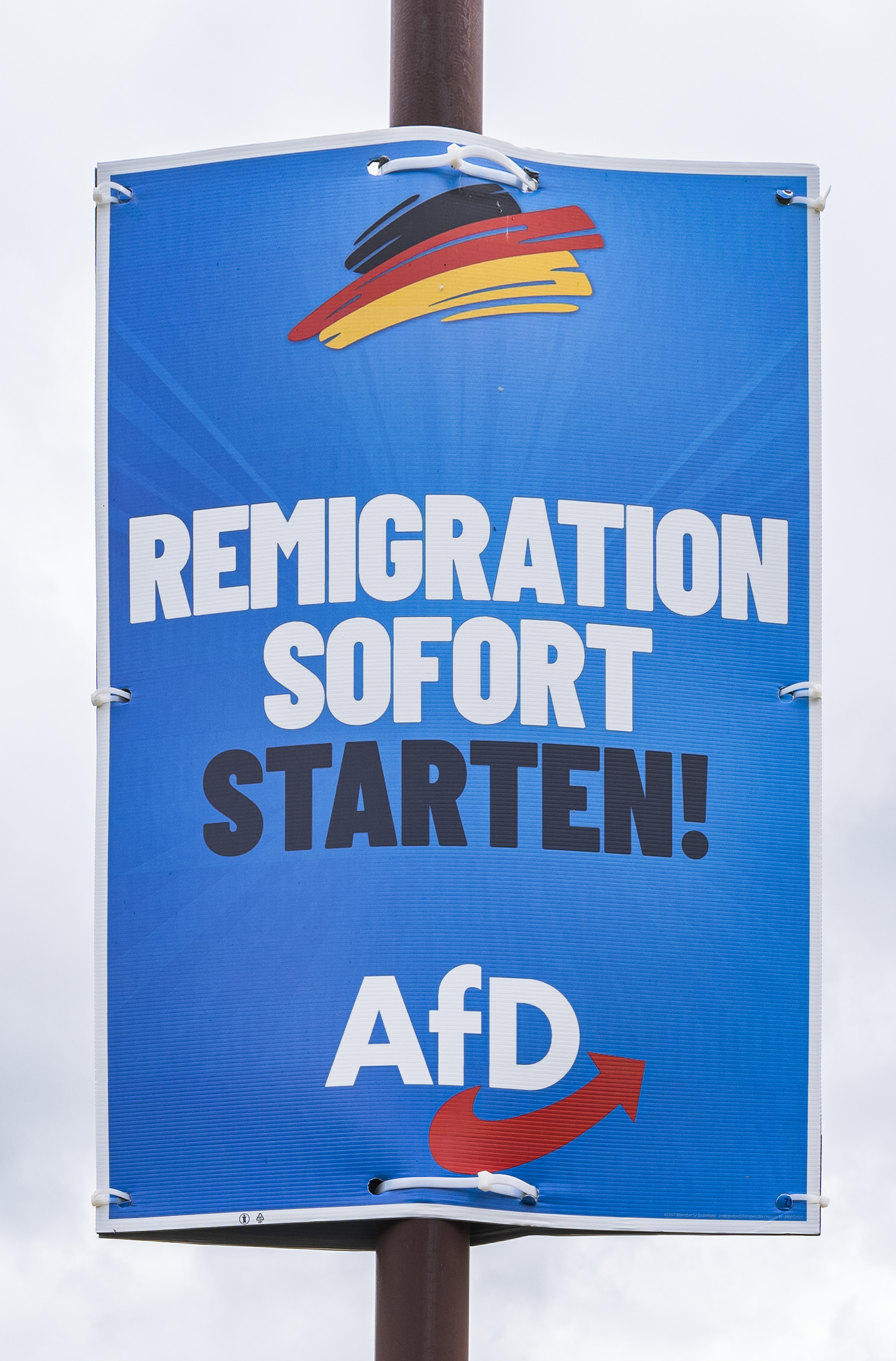
Election poster for the 2024 European Parliament election promoting remigration

Before the 2014 state elections, the AfD Thuringia developed its first election platform. In response to the refugee crisis in Germany beginning in 2015, the AfD Thuringia called for national upper limits. In the Greek sovereign debt crisis, the AfD Thuringia called for an end to financial support from German taxpayers.

The state association advocates for a reduction in the number of representatives in the Thuringian state parliament. A bill introduced by the AfD parliamentary group in May 2016 proposed reducing the number of representatives from the current 91 to 62.

The Thuringian AfD's pension plan, for example, initially proposed maintaining the contribution assessment ceiling. According to social researcher and mathematician Gerd Bosbach, this is antisocial because it would mean that top earners would have to contribute a smaller share of their income than low earners. Employers would benefit from this plan. Furthermore, the goal is to extend working life, both by abolishing the retirement age and by lowering the age at which people enter the workforce. Tax-financed supplements for recipients of small pensions should only be available to German citizens.

The party's election manifesto for the state elections in autumn 2024, adopted at a party conference in Pfiffelbach, listed the dissolution of the State Office for the Protection of the Constitution and a "deportation initiative" as goals. The party also wants to terminate the state media treaties on which public and private broadcasters broadcast. The manifesto also calls for a right of asylum exclusively for those politically persecuted and a reduction in the size of the Thuringian state parliament from the current 88 to 62 members.

=== Ideology ===
Since 2015, "the Thuringian state association of the AfD has been developing political concepts of völkisch-nationalism has taken over the discourse," according to a study by the Competence Center for Right-Wing Extremism at the Friedrich Schiller University Jena (Matthias Quent, Franziska Schmidtke and Axel Salheiser). According to political scientist Hajo Funke (2016), the faction has a "right-wing extremist thrust", He attested that the party leader had "völkisch-Nationalist Ideology". In the Thuringian regional association, "German nationalist voices with clear orientations in a far-right direction" are articulated, as the political scientist Armin Pfahl-Traughber (2016) noted.[1] According to the social scientist Alexander Häusler (2019), "a right-wing radicalization process has developed" in the Thuringian AfD.

The internet platform "ExtremismusMonitor Thüringen", published under the direction of legal scholar Markus Ogorek of the University of Cologne, documents around 150 systematically evaluated public and potentially unconstitutional statements by officials of the Thuringian AfD. According to study director Ogorek, the largest group of statements is classified as "hostility toward the (rule-based) state and political competition." The survey shows that the AfD's outbursts are not mere gaffes, but rather methodical.

At the beginning of 2025, Jena lawyer Raimond Ernst stated that Höcke's internal critics had been "deprived of any real options for power within the AfD." This led to "a cartel of silence, so that perhaps no one in the party will dare to criticize the party leader anymore." One's own future in the party would be "in a sense tied to being in the leader's favor."

== Election results ==
=== Landtag of Thuringia ===
2019 Thuringia state election results. AfD in blue.

2024 Thuringia state election results. AfD in blue.

Year	No. of overall votes	% of overall vote & ranking	No. of overall seats won	+/–
2014	99,548	10.57 (#4)	11 / 91	
2019	259,382	23.4 (#2)	22 / 90	▲11
2024	396,704	32.8 (#1)	32 / 88	▲10

== See also ==
- AfD Saxony
- AfD Saxony-Anhalt
- AfD Brandenburg
- AfD Berlin
- New states of Germany
- Der Flügel
