= Alternative Mitte =

German political party faction

- Formation: July 2017
- Dissolved: November 2019 (de facto)
- Type: Faction within AfD
- Legal status: Active
- Purpose: Campaigning
- Location: Germany
- Official language: German
- Parent organization: Alternative for Germany

The Alternative Mitte (German for "Alternative Midpoint" or "Alternative Centre"), sometimes referred to as Alternative Mitte Deutschland, was a faction and political association within the Alternative for Germany party which was formed in 2017 and presented itself as "liberal patriotic" and "conservative". It has been described by commentators as being founded as a counterweight and a response to the more hardline Der Flügel wing of the AfD. The faction ended its activities in November 2019 without dissolving officially; Der Flügel ended its activities officially in April 2020.

== History ==
In July 2017, a coalition formed within the AfD who took a critical view of rising voices within the party such as that of the Thuringian state spokesman and parliamentary group leader Björn Höcke, who in a speech described the Berlin Memorial to the Murdered Jews of Europe as a "monument of shame." Berengar Elsner von Gronow first founded the Alternative Mitte NRW (AM) in North Rhine-Westphalia with like-minded people in order to "finally give the moderate, the bourgeois, a perceptible and concerted voice." Gronow argued the party had to work harder to counter media accusations that the AfD was a far-right extremist movement and that a vocal minority should not be allowed to dominate the party's external perception.

The formation of the group was welcomed by former AfD chairwoman Frauke Petry and AfD national board member Dirk Driesang, who argued the party would not find peace unless there was an answer to the Der Flügel faction and networking was done to attract intellectual and middle class conservatives back to the AfD in order to strengthen Germany as a whole. In September 2017, the association branched out into Saxony-Anhalt, Hesse, Lower Saxony and Thuringia. The founder of Thuringia wing Helmut Witter argued that the party needed to focus on issues such as freedom of speech, law & order and the European Union while distancing itself from the Identitarian movement.

The AM was officiated nationwide in October 2017 in a meeting of around 200 AfD members in Tettau and was endorsed by AfD spokespeople Konrad Adam, Beatrix von Storch and Alice Weidel. In a speech addressing the group, Von Storch stated its objectives of advocating a balance between the national-conservative and the liberal-conservative parts of the party, for talks between the camps, remembering the "historical responsibility from the Nazi era," support for Israel and observing red lines on extremism.

The AM published an open letter to members and federal delegates of the AfD in which they warned against electing people to the federal executive board who do not respect liberal democratic basic order in Germany.

In February 2018, the AM planned a rally in Paderborn but was forced to cancel the event after the owner of the venue received death threats and threats of protests by left-wing activists.

In March 2018, the group called on AfD to formally reject any collaboration between the party and PEGIDA founder Lutz Bachmann.

== Reception ==
Journalist and author Matthias Kamann saw AM as an attempt to give those in the AfD a platform "who want it to be hard conservative, but factual - not ethnic or insulting. The fact that this voice has been missing so far is one of the many weaknesses of the party." On the other hand, commentator Alan Posener argued the AM was more about getting rid of the "yuck factor" rather than changing the ideological core of the party. Konrad Litschko of Die Tageszeitung described AM as a "current of moderate forces in the AfD." Tilman Steffen wrote in Die Zeit that he considers the AM group to be socio-economically right-wing populist but does not espouse Volkish ethnic nationalism and presents itself as a moderate alternative to Björn Höcke and Goetz Kubitschek and rejects the integration of PEGIDA and the Identitarian Movement into the AfD.

Writing in Frankfurter Rundschau political analyst and journalist Pitt von Bebenburg described the AM's objective as "preserving the nation state within secure borders and thus the local homeland," but rejecting "nationalism, revisionism, totalitarianism or a cult of personality that rises above others."

== Notable people associated with AM ==
- Berengar Elsner von Gronow
- Beatrix von Storch
- Alice Weidel
- Uwe Witt
