= Tina Rudolph =

German politician

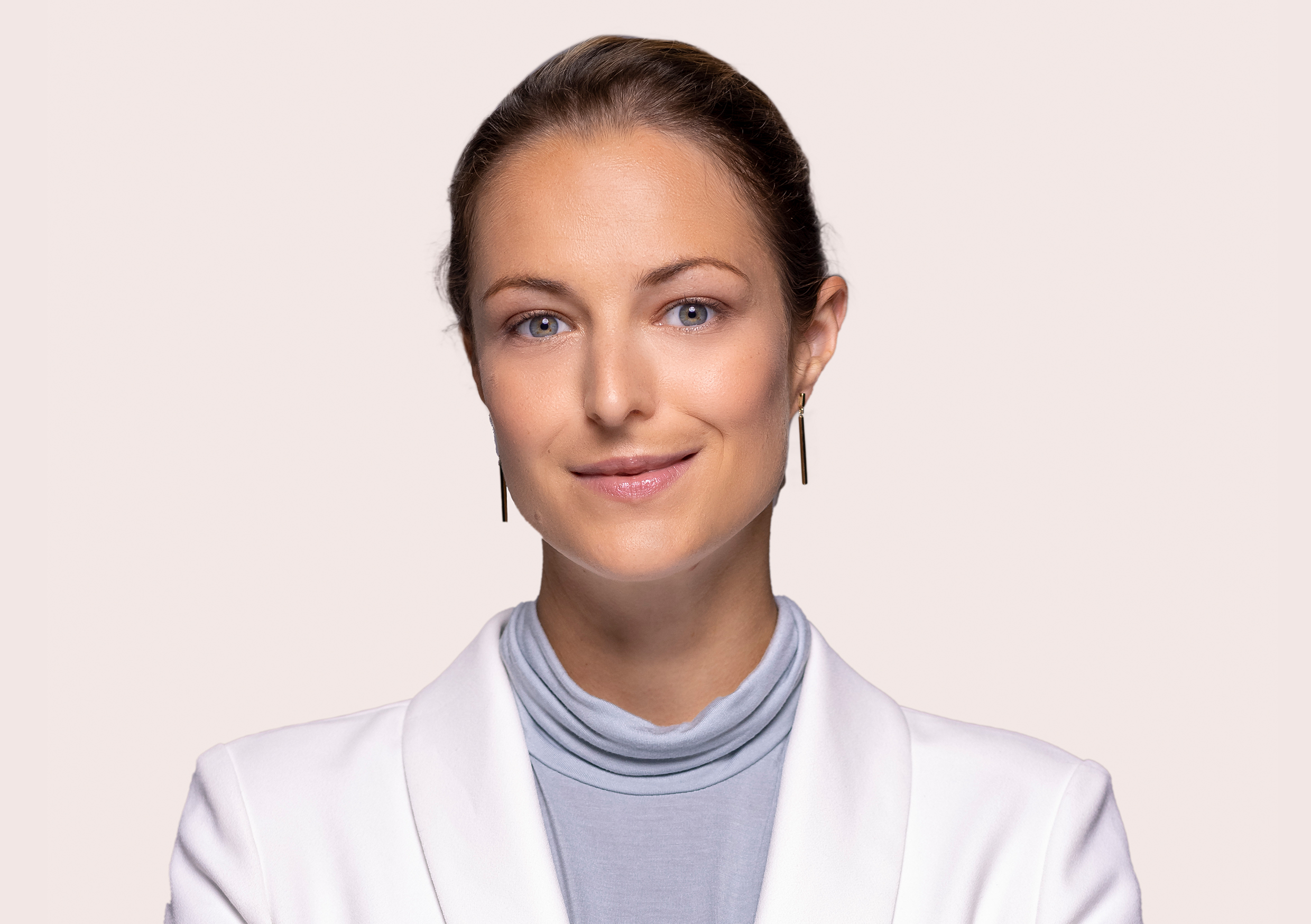
- Tina Rudolph in 2021

Member of the Bundestag
- Incumbent
- Assumed office 2021

Personal details
- Born: 21 May 1991 (age 35) Wolgast, Germany
- Party: SPD
- Education: University of Jena

Tina Rudolph (born 21 May 1991) is a physician and politician of the Social Democratic Party of Germany (SPD) who was elected to the Bundestag in 2021.

== Early life and education ==
Rudolph was born 1991 in Wolgast and grew up in Usedom. She studied medicine (2010–2017), political science (2014–2017) and philosophy (2014–2017) at the University of Jena. During her studies, she completed internships at the Livingstone Central Hospital in Livingstone (Zambia) and the Philippine General Hospital in Manila (Philippines).

From 2018 to 2021, Rudolph worked as parliamentary advisor to Edgar Franke.

== Political career ==
Rudolph was elected to the Bundestag in 2021, representing the Eisenach – Wartburgkreis – Unstrut-Hainich-Kreis district. She was appointed to membership of the Health Committee and its Subcommittee on Global Health.

Rudolph was a founding member of a cross-party group promoting a One Health approach since 2022.

Within her parliamentary group, Rudolph belongs to the Parliamentary Left, a left-wing movement.

== Other activities ==
- German Foundation for World Population (DSW), Member of the Parliamentary Advisory Board (since 2022)
- International Physicians for the Prevention of Nuclear War (IPPNW), Member
- Médecins Sans Frontières, Member
- German United Services Trade Union (ver.di), Member
