= Rhein-Wied-Gymnasium Neuwied =

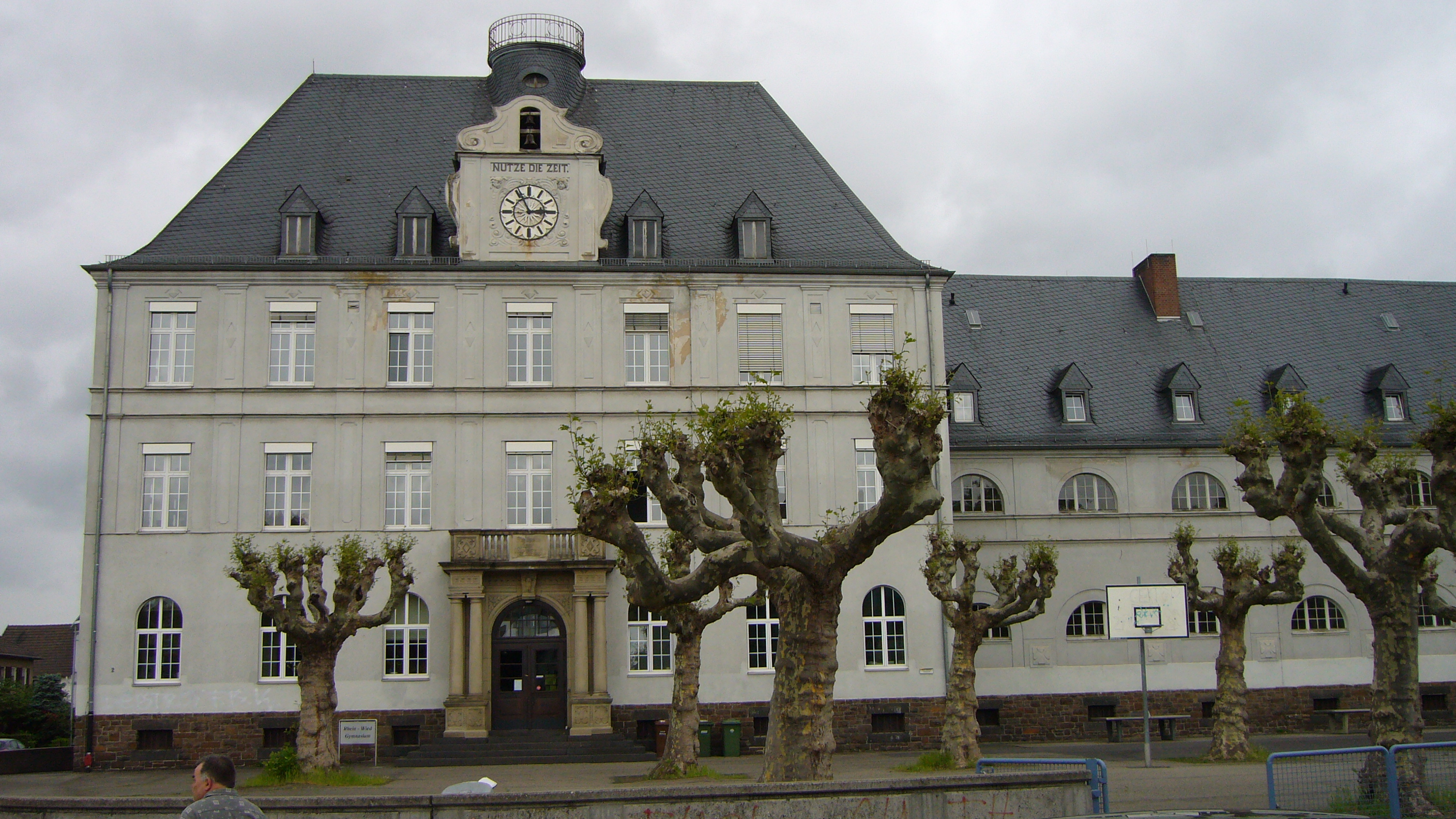

Location
- Im Weidchen 2; 56564 Neuwied; Rhineland-Palatinate; Germany
- Coordinates: 50°25′56.08″N 7°27′39.25″E

Information
- Type: Gymnasium
- Established: 1869 (private school); 1876 (municipal school)
- Local authority: District of Neuwied
- School code: 51214
- Head teacher: Helmut Zender
- Staff: 84 (as of November 2023)
- Enrolment: approx. 1,000 (as of 2023)
- Website: www.rwg-neuwied.de

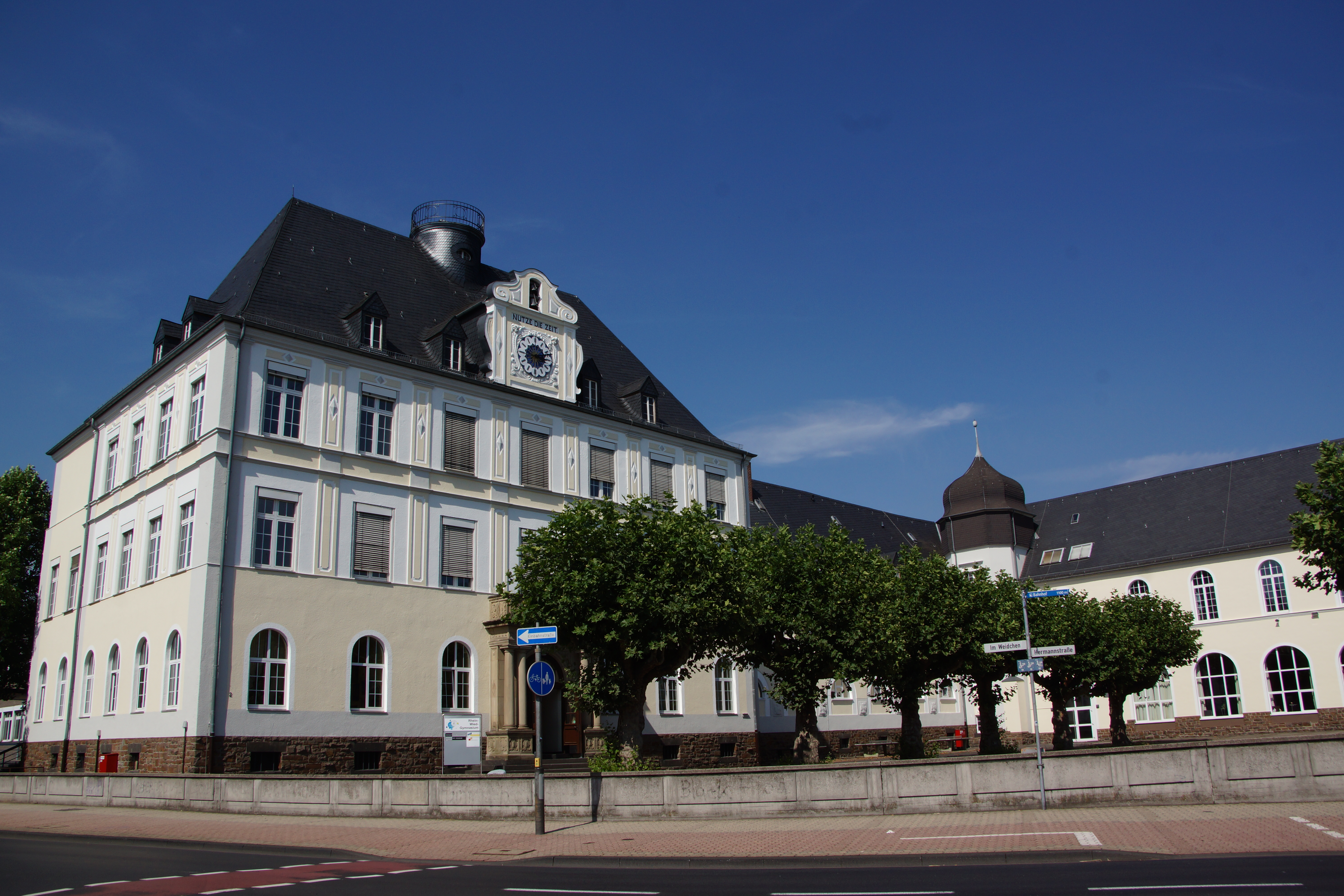
Rhein-Wied-Gymnasium Neuwied

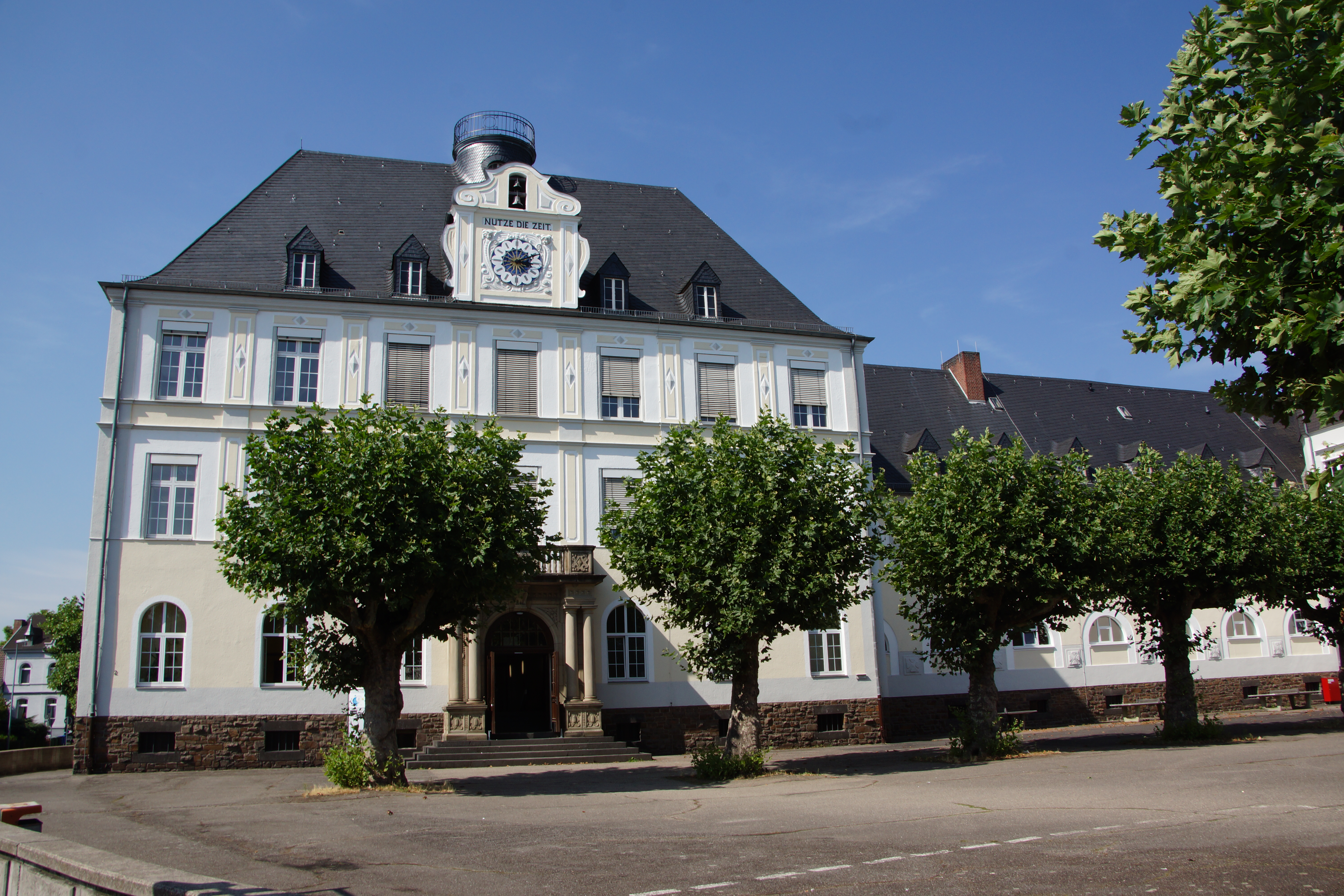
Rhein-Wied-Gymnasium Neuwied

The Rhein-Wied-Gymnasium (RWG) is a state Gymnasium in Neuwied in northern Rhineland-Palatinate. The school traces its origins to a private institution founded in 1869 and was taken over by the city of Neuwied in 1876 as the "Städtische Höhere Mädchenschule" (Municipal Higher Girls' School). Today, the Gymnasium is attended by approximately 1,000 students, who are taught by almost 80 teachers.

== History ==
=== Private School ===
In 1869, citizens of Neuwied decided to found a public school for girls, paritarian and without class barriers, that should pass into municipal hands as soon as possible. In its founding year, 83 students were already taught, with Clemens Nohl as headmaster. Even before this, a private girls' school existed in Neuwied, which alongside the Zinzendorf School of the Herrnhuter Brüdergemeine provided education for girls beyond general knowledge.

=== Municipal Higher Girls' School ===
Just a few years later, in 1876, the city of Neuwied assumed patronage over the school, thereby securing the legal and financial existence of its Higher Girls' School. The year 1876 is considered the actual founding year. In the same year, the school moved together with the city administration into a municipal building constructed in 1863, the present-day "Altes Rathaus" (Old Town Hall) on Pfarrstraße. In 1905, 280 girls attended the school, and by 1910, the number had risen to 360.

In 1908, under the new headmaster Ernst Wasserzieher, the girls' school was transformed into a "Lyzeum with Oberlyzeum and Seminarklasse". After further school reforms carried out in the first half of the 1920s, the school was designated an Oberlyzeum (upper lyceum) from 1924 onwards. This allowed the students to obtain university entrance qualifications for the first time; the first Abitur examinations took place in 1925.

Due to the continuing increase in student numbers, a new school building was constructed in 1912 at the present location at the upper end of Herrmannstraße. During the First World War, the school building was requisitioned by military offices and other authorities.

=== Teacher Training Institute ===
Shortly after its foundation, part of the school was converted into a Lehrerinnenbildungsanstalt (teacher training institute for women) in 1879. After a six-year education, students could attend the school for two more years and then take a teaching examination. Following the Prussian school reform, teacher training was expanded to a three-year Lehrerinnenseminar (women's teacher seminar) in 1893. Until the reform of teacher training in 1925, over 600 teachers graduated from the seminar.

=== Women's School ===
From 1933 to 1945, further changes occurred in the curriculum and designation. The Oberlyzeum became a "Frauenschule" (women's school) in 1936, with domestic science subjects taught in the three-year upper level. From 1938, a language track was re-established, allowing the school-leaving certificate to again enable university attendance.

In September 1944, the school building was severely damaged by a bomb, and classes were suspended. In March 1945, US troops occupied Neuwied and used the school building for their own purposes. School operations were able to resume in October 1945 in ten rooms of the main building. After the war, Neuwied belonged to the French occupation zone. French became the first foreign language; instead of grades, the French points system and a centralized Abitur were introduced. Both were abolished again in 1951.

=== Gymnasium ===
After the first school reforms in the 1950s, the previous Oberlyzeum became a "Staatliches Gymnasium für Mädchen" (State Gymnasium for Girls) in 1960 with the language sequence French, Latin, English. In 1964, the sequence was changed to English, Latin, French. In 1975, the Mainzer Studienstufe (Mainz study level, a form of upper secondary) was introduced.

In 1960, the responsibility for the school (Schulträger) was taken over by the state of Rhineland-Palatinate, while the Baulast (responsibility for building maintenance) remained with the city of Neuwied, which also paid for the multi-wing extension building constructed between 1965 and 1967.

Starting in 1971, the girls' Gymnasium was also opened to boys, initially only in the 5th and 11th grades. Co-education was fully implemented by 1977.

Language sequence: All students begin in year 5 with English as their first foreign language. From year 6, they choose French or Latin as a second foreign language. From year 9, Spanish or Latin are offered as additional foreign languages.

== Activities ==
Since October 2005, a partnership has existed with the SOS-Hermann-Gmeiner-Grundschule, which opened in 1997 in the SOS-Kinderdorf in Byumba in northern Rwanda. This school is attended by about 400 children, about a third of whom live in the children's village.

In the orientation stage (years 5–6), a focus is placed on experiential education. In this context, a three-day trip to the Waldjugendheim Kolbenstein takes place. In cooperation with the ADAC, children are made aware of the dangers of road traffic through the "Achtung Auto" (Attention Car) campaign.

Student exchanges are offered with Verviers (Belgium), London (United Kingdom) and Jönköping (Sweden).

In the upper school, several study trips take place (climbing and skiing project, trips to Rome, Spain, and Paris, as well as individual trips organized by the core courses).

=== Working Groups (AGs) ===
The school has been running working groups in cooperation with students and teachers for some time. These exist in linguistic as well as other subjects. In the mathematics AG "Knobelseminar", for example, mathematics-interested students from all grade levels can solve mathematical puzzles and develop solution strategies. The student magazine "Zoom", run as an AG, has been awarded several prizes, including a second prize in the 2007 Rhineland-Palatinate student newspaper competition and the 2008 special prize "HIV/AIDS prevention" of the German student newspaper award.

Further working groups include the music AG "Rock With Groove" (choir and band), a lower school choir "Chor 75", a volleyball AG, a nature AG, a school medical service, and a Rwanda AG.

There is also a theater AG, whose performances are received with great interest in Neuwied. It recently performed a self-written play "Fairytale gone bad" (2017), which delighted over 400 spectators and served as a fundraising campaign for "Café Asyl". The play was written by three current and former students and dealt with problems in communication and community.

The school has a school zoo and a lower school library. For older students, the school has a library.

Students of the RWG are involved in refugee work in cooperation with the Marienschule Neuwied. For this commitment, students of the RWG have been awarded several times by the state government. The school holds the title Schule ohne Rassismus – Schule mit Courage. In the 2015/2016 school year, a large Festival of Cultures took place as part of a school festival. Several female students of the school are or were recipients of the Johanna-Löwenherz-Medaille of the District of Neuwied.

== Alumni ==
- Jan Bollinger (born 1977), Abitur 1996, politician (AfD)
- Margarita Broich (born 1960), Abitur 1977, actress
- Hans-Peter Burghof (born 1963), Abitur 1984, professor of banking and financial services, University of Hohenheim
- Karin Prien (born 1965), Abitur 1984, Federal Minister for Education, Family, Seniors, Women and Youth (CDU)
- Volker Busch (born 1971), Abitur 1991, neuroscientist and non-fiction author
- Björn Höcke (born 1972), Abitur 1991, politician (AfD)
- Elke Hoff (born 1957), Abitur 1976, politician (FDP)
- Lana Horstmann (born 1986), Abitur 2006, politician (SPD)
- Johannes Huth (born 1989), Abitur 2008, actor
- Aylin Madenci, Abitur 2013, world champion in kickboxing
- Martina Plura (born 1985), Abitur 2005, director
- Monika Plura (born 1985), Abitur 2005, cinematographer
- Karsten Polke-Majewski (born c. 1972), Abitur 1991, journalist
- Niels Ruf (born 1973), television presenter, author and actor

== Notable faculty ==
- Guido Ernst (born 1950), politician (CDU)

== Sources ==
- Renate Schlemper-Rheinsberg im Heimat-Jahrbuch 1977 des Landkreises Neuwied, S. 29–32.
