= Berengar Elsner von Gronow =

German politician

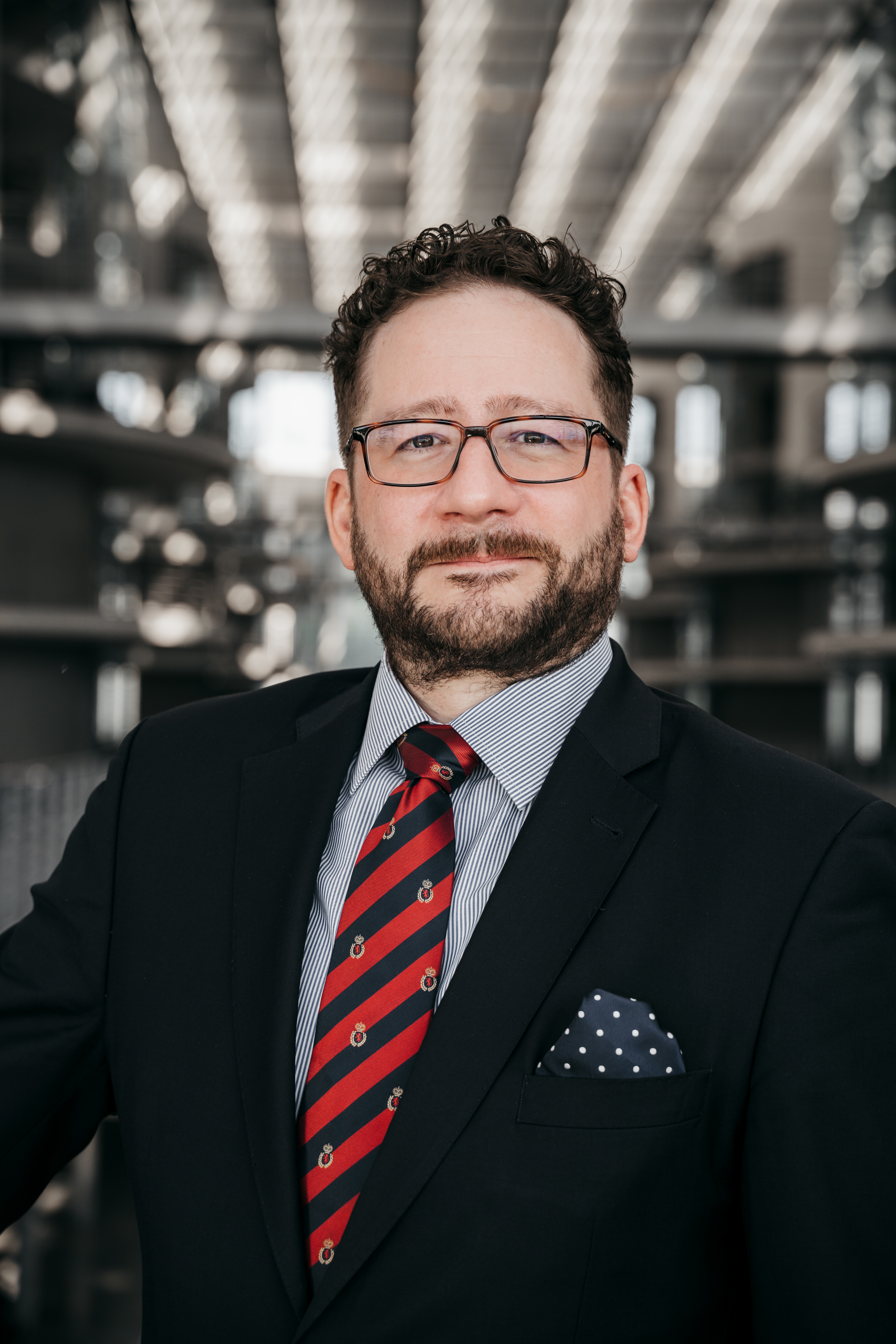

Member of the Bundestag
- In office 24 October 2017 – 26 October 2021

Personal details
- Born: 7 January 1978 (age 48) Bonn, Germany
- Party: AfD

Berengar Elsner von Gronow (born 7 January 1978) is a German politician for the populist Alternative for Germany (AfD) and served as a member of the Bundestag from 2017 to 2021.

== Life and achievements ==
Gronow was born 1978 in the former West German capital Bonn.

In 2013 he entered the newly founded AfD and after the 2017 German federal election he became member of the Bundestag, the first federal legislative body.

Gronow is a leading member of the dovish factional cluster Alternative Mitte (alternative midpoint) of the AfD.

Gronow lost reelection to the Bundestag in 2021 after not getting on the AfD-List, coming in fifth in his constinuency with 7,99%.

He has not held a political office since.
