= Awakening of German Patriots - Central Germany =

- Leader: Benjamin Przybylla
- Chairman: Bernhard Wedlich
- Founder: André Poggenburg
- Founded: January 11, 2019
- Dissolved: 2020
- Split from: Alternative for Germany
- Headquarters: Steinweg 18e 01662 Meissen
- Ideology: Ethnic nationalism German nationalism Right-wing populism Euroscepticism
- Political position: Far-right
- Colours: Light blue

Election symbol
- Cornflower

Awakening of German Patriots – Central Germany (German: Aufbruch deutscher Patrioten – Mitteldeutschland, short-form: AdPM) was a German political party that splintered from the Alternative for Germany (AfD) and was established by André Poggenburg on January 11, 2019, following his forced resignation from AfD in 2018.

== Background ==
In 2018, Poggenburg, the leader of the AfD's Saxony-Anhalt branch, was reprimanded by AfD leadership for messaging "Germany for Germans" to party members over WhatsApp. Later that year he resigned from the party after a censure for calling German Turks "camel drivers" and "caraway seed traders" in a speech to party supporters.

== History ==
=== Establishment ===
Following his ousting from the AfD, Poggenburg formed his own political party, the Awakening of German Patriots, claiming that the AfD no longer represented him politically, and was joined by other radical members of the Saxony-Anhalt AfD that where affiliated with Pegida including Egbert Ermer and Benjamin Przybylla. The party's logo would be unveiled to the German public on January 11, 2019, immediately being faced with criticism for including the Cornflower on the party logo. The Cornflower has long been a symbol of German Nationalists, first developed by Georg von Schönerer as a symbol of pan-Germanism it became a symbol of support for the Kaiser and later as a secret symbol of the Nazi party of Austria during the period from 1933 to 1938 when the party was banned; and most recently as the symbol of the Freedom Party of Austria until 2017.

Poggenburg announced that the party would follow what had been the AfD's party line from 2017 and prior, before what Poggenburg called a "shift to the left" within the party when it began to expel its more radical members. Poggenburg stated that the party intended to contest the upcoming elections and could enter regional parliaments. He also stated that the party intends to be a "middle German movement," with branches in Brandenburg, Saxony and Saxony-Anhalt.

In their first election, the May 2019 election, the party received only 0.6% of the vote in the Zwickau district and 0.4% of the vote at the Meißen district. In the September 2019 Saxony state election the party only won 0.2% of the votes cast.

=== Decline ===
After the poor performance in the local elections, Poggenburg applied at the August 2019 party congress for the party to dissolve and rejoin the AfD. The vote was rejected and Poggenburg left the party alongside his deputy[Egbert Ermer. Poggenburg was succeeded by Benjamin Przybylla as "interim" leader who stated his, and the party's, objectives would still be to expand into other states.

The party has staged no public events since spring of 2020 and only had 45 registered members.

Poggenburg later endorsed the Freie Sachsen (Free Saxons) for the 2024 Saxony state election.
