= Hallungen =

- Ortsteil of Südeichsfeld
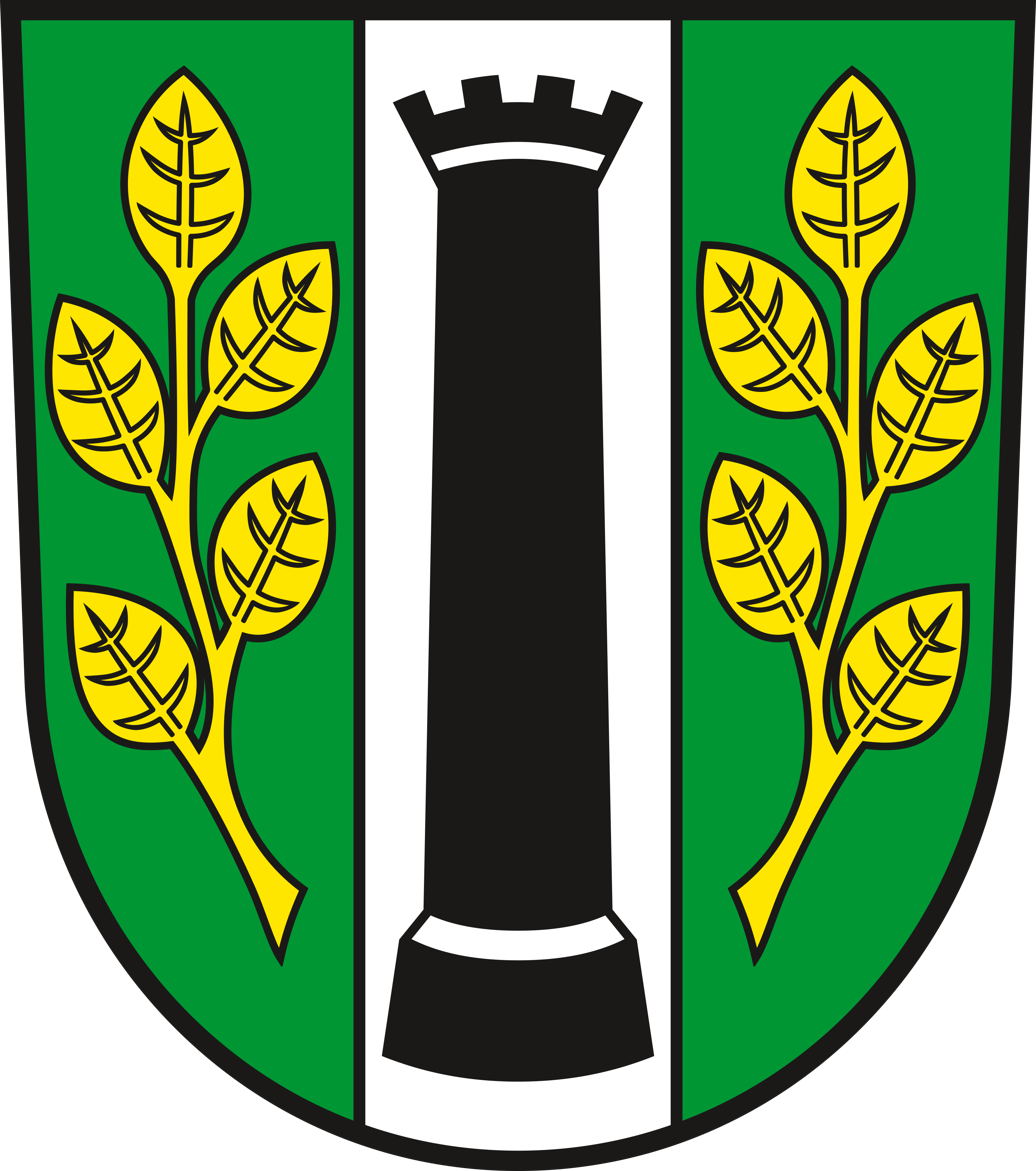
- Coat of arms
- Interactive map of Hallungen
- Location within Germany Location within Thuringia
- Coordinates: 51°8′N 10°20′E
- Country: Germany
- State: Thuringia
- District: Unstrut-Hainich-Kreis
- Municipality: Südeichsfeld

Area
  - Total: 3.98 km^{2} (1.54 sq mi)
- Elevation: 280 m (920 ft)

Population (2022-12-31)
  - Total: 184
  - Density: 46.2/km^{2} (120/sq mi)
- Time zone: UTC+01:00 (CET)
  - Summer (DST): UTC+02:00 (CEST)
- Postal codes: 99826
- Dialling codes: 036924

Hallungen (German pronunciation: [ˈhalʊŋən]) is a village and a former municipality in the Unstrut-Hainich-Kreis district of Thuringia, Germany. On 1 January 2024 it became part of the municipality Südeichsfeld, and changed from the Wartburgkreis to the Unstrut-Hainich-Kreis.
