= Hildebrandshausen =

- Ortsteil of Südeichsfeld
- Interactive map of Hildebrandshausen
- Location within Germany Location within Thuringia
- Coordinates: 51°12′N 10°13′E
- Country: Germany
- State: Thuringia
- District: Unstrut-Hainich-Kreis
- Municipality: Südeichsfeld

Area
  - Total: 6.08 km^{2} (2.35 sq mi)
- Elevation: 310 m (1,020 ft)

Population (2010-12-31)
  - Total: 414
  - Density: 68.1/km^{2} (176/sq mi)
- Time zone: UTC+01:00 (CET)
  - Summer (DST): UTC+02:00 (CEST)
- Postal codes: 99976
- Dialling codes: 036027
- Website: lg-suedeichsfeld.de

Hildebrandshausen (German pronunciation: [hɪldəbʁantsˈhaʊzn̩]) is a village and a former municipality in the Unstrut-Hainich-Kreis district of Thuringia, Germany. Since 1 December 2011, it is part of the municipality Südeichsfeld.
