= Südeichsfeld =

- Municipality
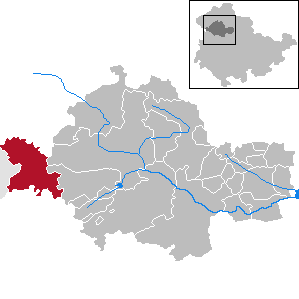
- Location of Südeichsfeld within Unstrut-Hainich-Kreis district
- Interactive map of Südeichsfeld
- Location within Germany Location within Thuringia
- Coordinates: 51°11′N 10°16′E
- Country: Germany
- State: Thuringia
- District: Unstrut-Hainich-Kreis

Government
  - Mayor (2024–30): Abdreas Dieter Henning

Area
  - Total: 64 km^{2} (25 sq mi)
- Elevation: 310 m (1,020 ft)

Population (2025-12-31)
  - Total: 6,419
  - Density: 100/km^{2} (260/sq mi)
- Time zone: UTC+01:00 (CET)
  - Summer (DST): UTC+02:00 (CEST)
- Postal codes: 99976, 99988
- Dialling codes: 036027
- Vehicle registration: UH

Südeichsfeld (German pronunciation: [ˈzyːtˌʔaɪçsfɛlt, -aɪk-], lit. 'South Eichsfeld') is a municipality in the Unstrut-Hainich-Kreis district, Thuringia, Germany. It was formed by the merger of the previously independent municipalities Heyerode, Katharinenberg, Hildebrandshausen and Lengenfeld unterm Stein, on 1 December 2011. On 1 January 2024, it absorbed the former municipality Hallungen.
