= Lengenfeld unterm Stein =

- Ortsteil of Südeichsfeld
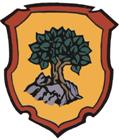
- Coat of arms
- Interactive map of Lengenfeld unterm Stein
- Location within Germany Location within Thuringia
- Coordinates: 51°12′53″N 10°13′18″E
- Country: Germany
- State: Thuringia
- District: Unstrut-Hainich-Kreis
- Municipality: Südeichsfeld

Area
  - Total: 13.34 km^{2} (5.15 sq mi)
- Elevation: 260 m (850 ft)

Population (2010-12-31)
  - Total: 1,246
  - Density: 93.40/km^{2} (241.9/sq mi)
- Time zone: UTC+01:00 (CET)
  - Summer (DST): UTC+02:00 (CEST)
- Postal codes: 99976
- Dialling codes: 036027
- Website: l-u-st.de

Lengenfeld unterm Stein (German pronunciation: [ˈlɛŋənˌfɛlt ʔʊntɐm ˈʃtaɪn], lit. 'Lengenfeld under the Stein'; or Lengenfeld/Stein) is a village and a former municipality in the Unstrut-Hainich-Kreis district of Thuringia, Germany. Since 1 December 2011, it is part of the municipality Südeichsfeld.
