= Christian Hirte =

German lawyer and politician (born 1976)

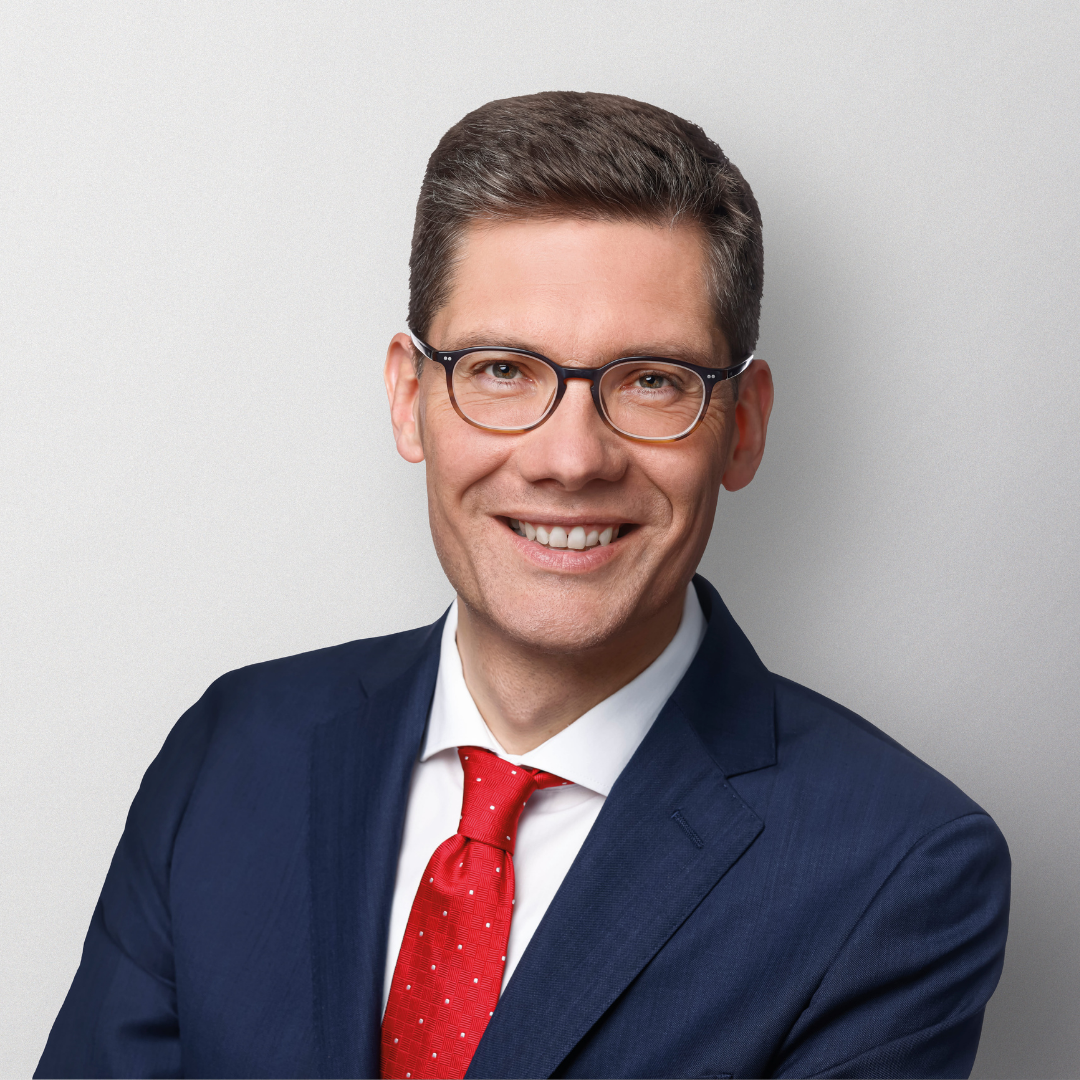
- Hirte in 2021

Leader of the Christian Democratic Union in Thuringia
- In office 19 September 2020 – 17 September 2022
- Deputy: Raymond Walk; Beate Meißner; Thadäus König
- Preceded by: Mike Mohring
- Succeeded by: Mario Voigt

Parliamentary State Secretary for Small Enterprises and the New States
- In office 14 March 2018 – 8 February 2020
- Minister: Peter Altmaier
- Preceded by: Iris Gleicke (New States, Small Enterprises and Tourism)
- Succeeded by: Marco Wanderwitz (New States)

Member of the Bundestag for Eisenach – Wartburgkreis – Unstrut-Hainich-Kreis (CDU List; 2008–2009)
- Incumbent
- Assumed office 15 May 2008
- Preceded by: Bernward Müller

Personal details
- Born: 23 May 1976 (age 50) Bad Salzungen, East Germany (now Germany)
- Party: Christian Democratic Union
- Education: University of Jena
- Website: Official website

Christian Hirte (born 23 May 1976) is a German lawyer and politician of the Christian Democratic Union (CDU) who has been serving as member of the German Bundestag since 2008. From 2020 to 2022, he has been the chairman of the CDU in Thuringia and co-deputy Chairman since then.

From 2018 to 2020, Hirte served as Parliamentary State Secretary in the Federal Ministry for Economic Affairs and Energy and additionally as commissioner of the federal government for the new states in the government of Chancellor Angela Merkel.

== Education and early career ==
Hirte studied law at the University of Jena with a scholarship from the Konrad Adenauer Foundation and passed the first state examination in 2001 and the second in 2003. In 2004 he became an associate in the law firm Dr. Muth & Partner in Fulda, and specialized in tax law.

== Political career ==
Hirte joined the centre-right Junge Union in 1993 and the CDU in 1995.

Hirte has been a member of the Bundestag since 2008. In parliament, he has served on the Committee on the Environment, Nature Conservation and Nuclear Safety (2008-2013), the Committee on Tourism (2009-2013), the Budget Committee (2013-2017) and the Audit Committee (2013-2017). On the Budget Committee, he was his parliamentary group's rapporteur on the annual budget of the Federal Ministry of the Environment, Nature Conservation and Nuclear Safety.

In the negotiations to form a coalition government under the leadership of Chancellor Angela Merkel following the 2017 federal elections, Hirte was part of the CDU delegation. Following the formation of the government, he became Parliamentary State Secretary under the leadership of minister Peter Altmaier. As federal commissioner for the new states, he advocated increased focus on rehabilitating and compensating victims of the East German Communist Party.

For the 2021 elections, Hirte was elected to lead the CDU campaign in Thuringia. Following the elections, he unsuccessfully ran for a position as one of the CDU/CSU parliamentary group’s deputy chairs; in an internal vote, he lost against Sepp Müller.

== Thuringia affair ==
Hirte was removed from his office as Parliamentary State Secretary and commissioner for the new states after he posted a congratulatory message on Twitter to FDP politician Thomas Kemmerich for his election as Minister-President in Hirte's home state of Thuringia. Kemmerich had been elected with the votes of the CDU, the FDP and the AfD, marking the first time a Minister-President has been elected with the votes of the AfD. Due to AfD's involvement, the election was widely condemned, including by Chancellor Merkel and CDU leader Annegret Kramp-Karrenbauer. Hirte's dismissal was condemned by the Values Union, a faction within CDU, which defended him and accused Merkel of silencing party critics.

== FSB agent controversy ==
From March 2023 until 2024, Hirte employed Konstantin Khrapov, a Russian national whom German security authorities subsequently identified as an agent of the Federal Security Service (FSB). Khrapov worked in Hirte's parliamentary office and contributed to speeches concerning the Russo-Ukrainian war. According to the Frankfurter Allgemeine Zeitung, German security authorities concluded that Khrapov had worked for the FSB before his employment in the Bundestag.

Khrapov also maintained contacts with members of the Russian opposition to Vladimir Putin and assisted Hirte in arranging visits by Russian opposition figures to the Bundestag. According to iStories, Khrapov was also associated with the Center for Social and Economic Research (CASE), a Warsaw-based think tank.

Khrapov denied working for Russian intelligence and rejected the allegations reported by the Frankfurter Allgemeine Zeitung. He said that he intended to contact German police in an effort to clear his name and attributed the reporting to political disputes within Germany.

== Other activities ==
=== Corporate boards ===
- Klinikum Bad Salzungen, Member of the Supervisory Board

=== Non-profit organizations ===
- Gegen Vergessen – Für Demokratie, Member of the Board (since 2018)
- Point Alpha Stiftung, Member of the Advisory Board
- German Bishops' Conference, Member of the Working Group on Ecology (2013-2016)

== Political positions ==
In June 2017, Hirte voted against Germany’s introduction of same-sex marriage.

Ahead of the Christian Democrats’ leadership election in 2021, Hirte expressed support for a candidacy of Ralph Brinkhaus. In the run-up to the Christian Democrats’ leadership election in 2022, he publicly endorsed Friedrich Merz to succeed Armin Laschet as the party’s chair.

== Personal life ==
Hirte is Catholic, married and has three children.
