= Heyerode =

- Ortsteil of Südeichsfeld
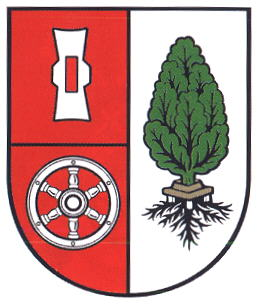
- Coat of arms
- Interactive map of Heyerode
- Location within Germany Location within Thuringia
- Coordinates: 51°9′50″N 10°19′10″E
- Country: Germany
- State: Thuringia
- District: Unstrut-Hainich-Kreis
- Municipality: Südeichsfeld

Area
  - Total: 5.68 km^{2} (2.19 sq mi)
- Elevation: 349 m (1,145 ft)

Population (2010-12-31)
  - Total: 2,264
  - Density: 399/km^{2} (1,030/sq mi)
- Time zone: UTC+01:00 (CET)
  - Summer (DST): UTC+02:00 (CEST)
- Postal codes: 99988
- Dialling codes: 036024
- Website: www.heyerode.de

Heyerode (German pronunciation: [haɪəˈʁoːdə]) is a village and a former municipality in the Unstrut-Hainich-Kreis district of Thuringia, Germany. Since 1 December 2011, it is part of the municipality Südeichsfeld.
