= Der Flügel =

Faction of the Alternative for Germany party

The Wing Der Flügel
- Leader: Björn Höcke
- Founders: Björn Höcke, André Poggenburg
- Founded: 14 March 2015
- Dissolved: 30 April 2020
- Membership: 7,000
- Ideology: Neo-fascism; Ultranationalism; Völkisch nationalism
- Political position: Far-right
- National affiliation: Alternative for Germany
- Colors: Light blue; Red

Website
- www.derfluegel.de (archived)
- A: The Wing has also been described as neo-Nazi by some international academic analysts and institutes.

Der Flügel (German: [deːɐ̯ fly:gel]; lit. 'The Wing') was a far-right, neo-fascist and ultra-nationalist faction of the Alternative for Germany (AfD) party. It was founded by Björn Höcke in the state of Thuringia on 14 March 2015. It was reportedly the most radical faction of AfD, and Germany's domestic intelligence agency placed it under "formal surveillance" due to its alleged right-wing extremism in 2020. It ceased to exist the same year, after the executive committee of the AfD voted to dissolve it on 30 April 2020. After its dissolution, its founder and leader Höcke made a video on Facebook confirming that it no longer exists.

== History ==
AfD members in the eastern states of the former East Germany adopted a hard right-wing ideology primarily focused against Muslim immigrants to act as a counterweight to the liberal wing of Bernd Lucke which sought the party to focus on Atlanticism. Der Flügel was formally founded in 2015 by Björn Höcke, party leader in Thurngia, and André Poggenburg, party leader in Saxony-Anhalt and adopted a völkisch line, calling for the AfD to be the guardians of the Volksgemeinschaft.

== See also ==
- AfD Saxony
- AfD Thuringia
- Alternative Mitte
- List of political parties in Germany
- Stahlhelm-Fraktion
