= Katharinenberg =

- Ortsteil of Südeichsfeld
- Interactive map of Katharinenberg
- Location within Germany Location within Thuringia
- Coordinates: 51°10′57″N 10°15′44″E
- Country: Germany
- State: Thuringia
- District: Unstrut-Hainich-Kreis
- Municipality: Südeichsfeld

Area
  - Total: 34.78 km^{2} (13.43 sq mi)
- Elevation: 421 m (1,381 ft)

Population (2010-12-31)
  - Total: 2,992
  - Density: 86.03/km^{2} (222.8/sq mi)
- Time zone: UTC+01:00 (CET)
  - Summer (DST): UTC+02:00 (CEST)
- Postal codes: 99988
- Dialling codes: 036024
- Website: www.katharinenberg.de

Katharinenberg (German pronunciation: [kataˈʁiːnənˌbɛʁk]) is a village and a former municipality in the Unstrut-Hainich-Kreis district of Thuringia, Germany. Since 1 December 2011, it is part of the municipality Südeichsfeld.
