= Vogtei (Verwaltungsgemeinschaft) =

Coordinates: 51°09′59″N 10°25′10″E

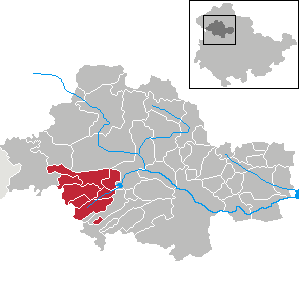

Vogtei is a former municipal association (Verwaltungsgemeinschaft) in the district Unstrut-Hainich-Kreis in Thuringia, Germany. The seat of the association was in Oberdorla. It was disbanded on 31 December 2012.

The Verwaltungsgemeinschaft Vogtei consisted of five municipalities: Oberdorla, Kammerforst, Langula, Niederdorla, and Oppershausen.
