= Klaus Stöber =

German politician

Member of the Bundestag
- In office 26 September 2021 – 23 February 2025

Personal details
- Born: 11 September 1961 (age 64) Eisenach
- Party: AfD

Klaus Stöber (born 11 September 1961) is a German politician for the AfD and was, from 2021 to March 2025, a member of the Bundestag.

== Life and politics ==
Stöber was born in 1961 in the East German town of Eisenach and was directly elected to the Bundestag in 2021.
