= Björn Höcke =

German politician (born 1972)

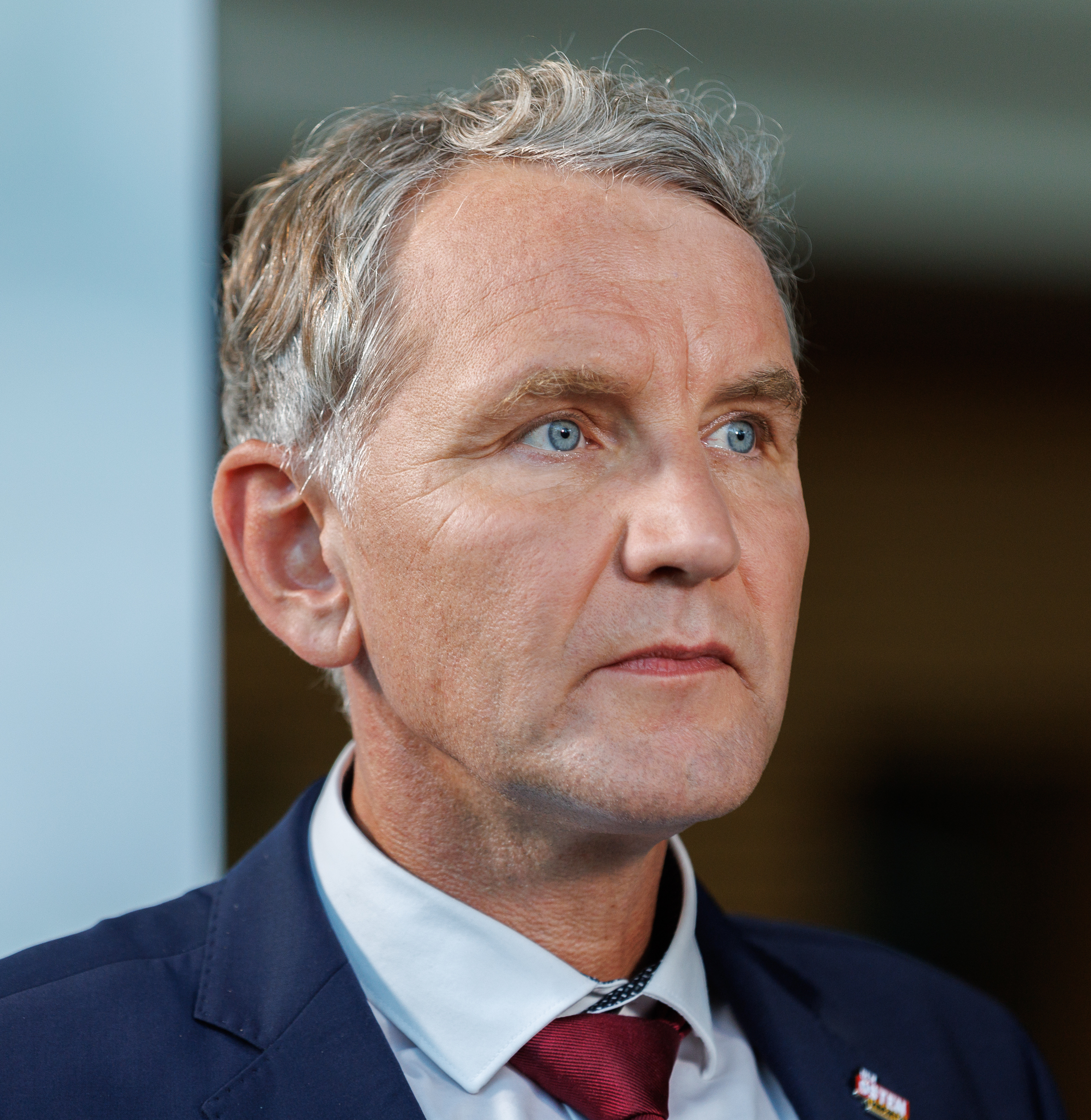
- Höcke in 2024

Leader of Alternative for Germany in Thuringia
- Incumbent
- Assumed office February 2013
- Preceded by: Office established

Member of the Landtag of Thuringia
- Incumbent
- Assumed office 5 December 2014

Leader of Der Flügel
- In office 15 May 2020 – 30 April 2020
- Preceded by: Andreas Kalbitz

Spokesperson of Der Flügel
- In office 15 May 2020 – 30 April 2020
- Preceded by: Andreas Kalbitz

Personal details
- Born: Björn Uwe Höcke; 1 April 1972 (age 54) Lünen, North Rhine-Westphalia, West Germany
- Party: Alternative for Germany (since 2013)
- Children: 4

Björn Uwe Höcke (born 1 April 1972) is a German politician of the far-right party Alternative for Germany (AfD). He is chair of the state branch of the AfD in Thuringia, which is classified as a far-right extremist organization. Höcke led the AfD to its first-ever first place finish in a state election at the 2024 Thuringian state election. It was the first time a far-right party placed first in an election since the Nazi era.

After Andreas Kalbitz was banned from the AfD, Höcke was the sole leader of the party's far-right Der Flügel faction, which the German government's Federal Office for the Protection of the Constitution declared a suspected right-wing extremist organization. Even after its formal dissolution, Höcke is considered the most influential politician in the AfD due to his strong network.

== Early life and education ==
Björn Höcke was born in Lünen and grew up in Anhausen and Neuwied. Höcke's father was a teacher at State School for the Blind and Partially-Sighted (Neuwied) while his mother was a nurse. His father is a Protestant and his mother is a Catholic. In 1986, Björn was baptized and confirmed as a Protestant.

His paternal grandparents were expelled Germans from East Prussia. Höcke took his Abitur at Rhein-Wied-Gymnasium in 1991.

Höcke studied sport and history at University of Giessen and at University of Marburg before working as a teacher. He taught at the Rhenanus School, a comprehensive school in Bad Sooden-Allendorf.

He is married to Nora Höcke and they have four children.

== Political career ==
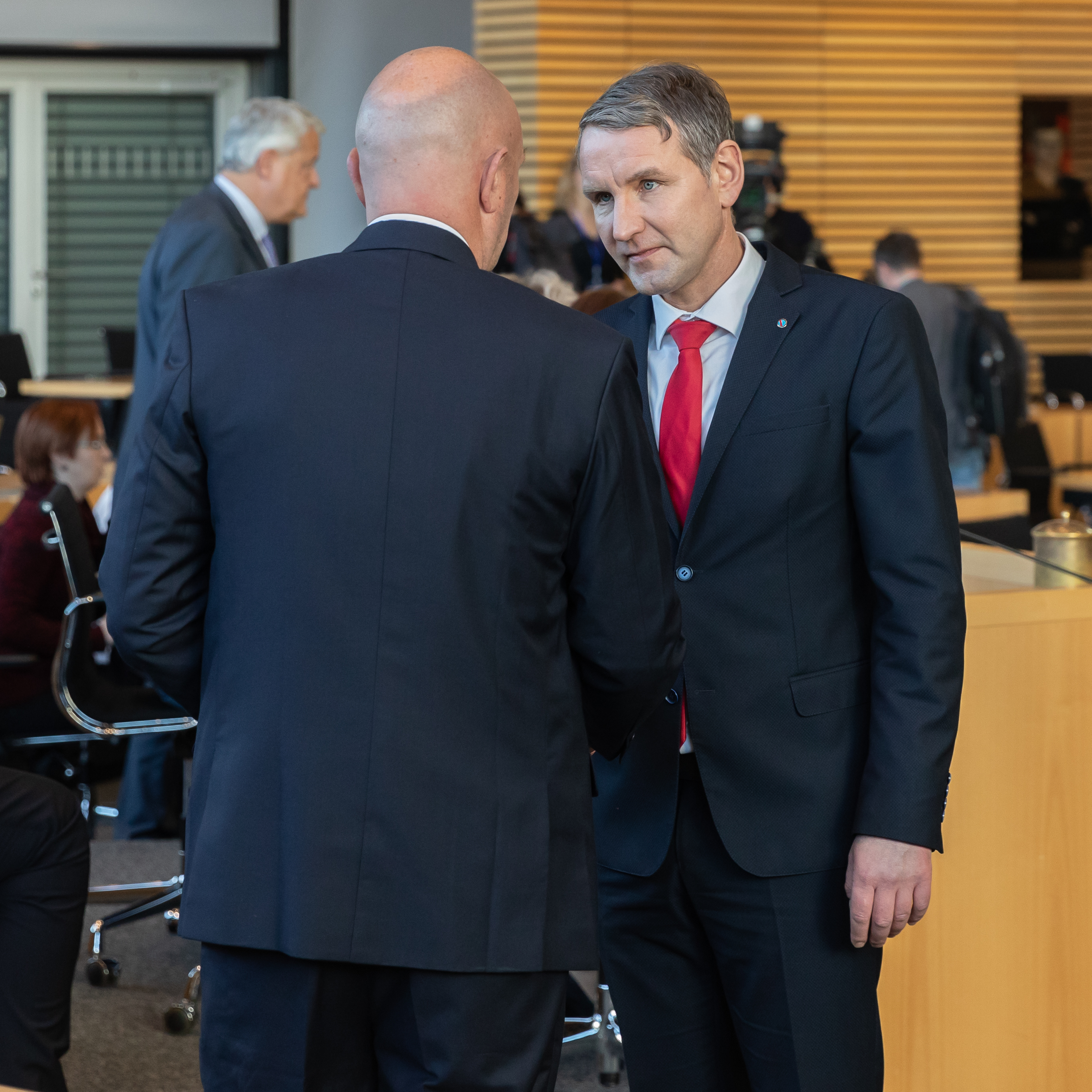
Höcke congratulates FDP's Thomas Kemmerich on his election, during the 2020 Thuringian government crisis.

In 1986, Höcke was briefly a member of Junge Union, the joint youth organisation of the CDU/CSU coalition.

As one of the founders of AfD Thuringia, he was elected to the Landtag or state parliament of Thuringia following the 2014 election. He is the speaker of the parliamentary group of the AfD and the spokesman of the Thuringia Regional Association (Landesverband) of his party. He is said to be the leader of the "national-conservative wing" of the AfD, a faction known as the Flügel (the Wing), with which 40 percent of AfD party members identify themselves.

Previously a rather obscure regional politician of a new party, Höcke became known nationwide in 2015, when party leader Bernd Lucke was ousted in July and the 2015 European migrant crisis unfolded. In October 2015, one day after a knife attack on Cologne mayor Henriette Reker, during the political talkshow "Günther Jauch", Höcke pulled out a small German flag and stated, "3000 years of Europe, 1000 years of Germany".

In September 2019, Höcke threatened "massive consequences" to a ZDF journalist who refused to restart an interview after a series of difficult questions and asked party members whether various quotes were from a book Höcke had written or from Adolf Hitler's Mein Kampf.

Höcke led the AfD in the 2019 Thuringian state election, where it doubled its vote share to 23% and overtook the main opposition party, the Christian Democratic Union (CDU), to place second.

In 2021, the moderate AfD co-leader Jörg Meuthen attempted to remove Höcke from the party on account of his alleged racism, but failed. This led to Meuthen ultimately quitting the party in 2022.

In November 2021, Höcke's parliamentary immunity in the Landtag of Thuringia was cancelled. He was accused of ending a speech in May 2021 with the phrase Alles für Deutschland ("All/Everything for Germany"), a phrase used by the Hitlerian regime's SA paramilitary wing and whose use is illegal under insignia legislation. In June 2023, Höcke was officially indicted for this. He was indicted for an additional charge after making use of the phrase again in December 2023 during an AfD meeting in Gera. He was convicted in both instances in separate trials by the regional court of Halle in May and June 2024, and sentenced to two monetary fines totalling €29,900. Höcke appealled the judgement, but the convictions were upheld by the Federal Court of Justice in September 2025.

Before the 2024 local elections in Thuringia, Höcke attempted to prevent already nominated candidates in the Saalfeld-Rudolstadt district from being elected and to replace them with candidates he favored. To this end, his state executive committee wanted to expel nine local AfD members from the party. Nevertheless, Höcke's internal opponent, Karlheinz Frosch, secured the top spot on the party list. The Gera Regional Court allowed the already nominated candidates to proceed. Höcke then called for the election of an "Alternative for the Saalfeld-Rudolstadt District" (AfL) and had his portrait printed on their posters. In order to achieve the expulsion of those nine AfD members, he accused them of an alleged "conspiracy against the grassroots democratic, undisputed decision-making process," which he claimed had severely damaged the party. Subsequently, several AfD local politicians, including the mayoral candidate for Rudolstadt, Jörg Gasda, demanded that Höcke himself be expelled from the AfD. Furthermore, it was uncertain whether Höcke's alternative list was compatible with the electoral law. In the state election, the CDU received the most votes in that district, while the official AfD list received five percent (three seats) more than Höcke's list.

In the 2024 Thuringian state election, the AfD, under the leadership of Höcke, increased its vote share to a record high of 33%, and became the biggest party in the state. It is the biggest voteshare ever won by the party and the first time AfD placed first in a federal state election.

== Political views ==
Map of the German Reich (German Empire) before its entry into World War I in 1914

Höcke espouses far-right views and advocates for Prussian virtues. During demonstrations in autumn of 2015, Höcke called for Germany to have "not only a thousand year past", but also "a thousand year future." He would go on to describe the period of the German Reich from 1871 to 1914 as the heyday for the German People.

When Höcke was young, his family frequently discussed their expulsion from East Prussia. His grandparents instilled in him a strong sense of belonging to East Prussia, even though he had never lived there. The family obituary for Höcke's grandmother features the coat of arms of the Landsmannschaft Ostpreußen, an organization for people displaced from East Prussia. Höckes speeches often reference the expulsion of Germans from East Prussia at the end of World War II, suggesting that this experience of his grandparents has influenced his views on German identity and victimhood. His father subscribed to the antisemitic magazine Die Bauernschaft, published by prominent Holocaust denier Thies Christophersen, and supported individuals and groups with ties to far-right groups. This suggests that Höcke was exposed to right-wing ideologies from a young age.

Höcke has stated that "the big problem is that one presents Hitler as absolutely evil." He believes that Germans have been denied the right to national pride and expression due to their country's history. He has questioned the amount of time that German schools spend teaching students about Nazis. He has called the Holocaust memorial in Berlin a "monument of shame," and wants a "180-degree change in memory policy."

Höcke has used the term "Lebensraum," which was used by Nazis to refer to territorial expansion and has questioned why this phrase is denounced by the German public. He called former Chancellor Angela Merkel's officials a "Tat-Elite," a term SS officers used to refer to themselves.

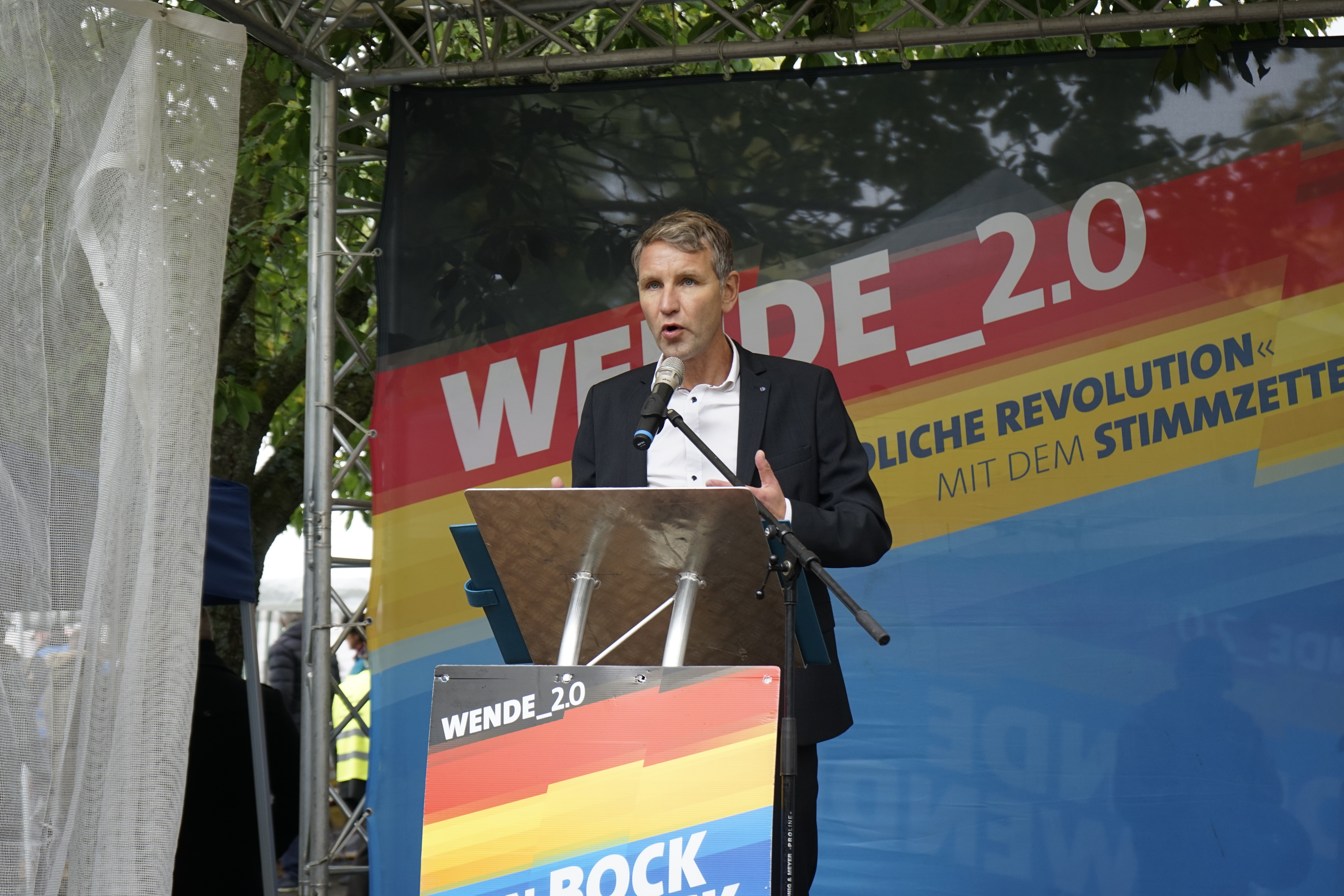
Höcke at a rally for the 2019 state election

Political scientists such as Gero Neugebauer and Hajo Funke have commented that Höcke's opinions are close to the Die Heimat and consider his statements völkisch, racist and fascist. In September 2019, a German court ruled that describing Höcke as fascist was not libelous. However, a later court ruling in 2020 ruled against the FDP politician Sebastian Czaja for stating that the court ruling had classified Höcke as a fascist. He participated in several rallies of the anti-Islam Pegida movement alongside Andreas Kalbitz in the early 2020s.

Höcke has expressed public support for the far-right ecologist magazine Die Kehre (The Turning), which has been published since 2020 in an attempt to "reclaim" environmental conservation from the left.

In April 2026 he laid out his political views for the future of Germany in a 4 ½ hour interview that went viral in Germany, gathering more than a million views in the first day it got published on YouTube.

=== Education ===
He opposes the mainstreaming of students with disabilities, calling for such students to go to separate special education schools. In an interview with far-right publisher Götz Kubitschek, Höcke compared inclusive schooling to communism and claimed that the Convention on the Rights of Persons with Disabilities by the United Nations only applied to newly industrialized and developing countries. He opposes school sexual education, which he called "harmful, expensive, tax-funded social experiments that serve to abolish the natural order of sexes" and a means of "early sexualization of the students". Höcke described sexual education as an attempt to "dissolute the natural polarity of the two sexes", stating that "the higher development of humanity goes back to polarity".

=== Family ===
Höcke has called for more Prussian virtues and promotes natalist views, specifically the "three-child family as a political and social model." He opposes gender mainstreaming and demands an end to what he calls "social experiments" that undermine what he deems the "natural gender order."

=== Foreign affairs ===
Höcke supports closer relations with Russia. He once said that if he ever became the German Chancellor, he would visit Russia in his first trip abroad. In a January 2023 video debate, Höcke said "Today, Russia — whether the mainstream media want to hear it or not — is a country which not only provokes negative associations but is also a country that hopes it could possibly be a pioneer for a world of free and sovereign states without hegemonic influence".

At a state party conference of the Thuringian AfD at the end of 2022, Höcke described the right-wing Hungarian Prime Minister Viktor Orbán as a "role model"; he is "perhaps one of the last statesmen in Europe". Höcke described his election defeat in April 2026 as a "weakening of patriotic forces in Europe"; it is undoubtedly a setback in the short term.

=== Immigration ===
Regarding the 2015 European migrant crisis, Höcke opposed Germany's asylum policy, leading regular demonstrations in Erfurt against the federal government's asylum policy, which regularly attracted several thousand sympathizers. He opposes the euro, favoring a return to national currencies. He has been critical of the Made in Germany – Made by Vielfalt campaign.

He is reported to have declared that if Europe keeps on taking in immigrants, the African "reproductive behavior" will not change. In 2017, Höcke stated, "dear young African men: for you there is no future and no home in Germany and in Europe!"

== Controversies ==
=== Ties to Neo-Nazis ===
Höcke has links with neo-Nazi circles in Germany. Höcke has written with Thorsten Heise, a leader of NPD. In 2015 Höcke was accused of having contributed to Heise's journal People in Motion (Volk in Bewegung) & The Reichsbote under a pseudonym ("Landolf Ladig"). Höcke denied having ever written for NPD papers, but refused to give a statutory declaration as demanded by the AfD Federal Executive Board.

In a 2014 email to party colleagues, Höcke advocated the abolition of section 86 of the German Criminal Code (which prohibits the spread of propaganda by unconstitutional organizations) and section 130 of the German Criminal Code (which criminalizes incitement to hatred towards other groups). This would also have legalized Holocaust denial, which is illegal in Germany.

=== Allegations of antisemitism ===
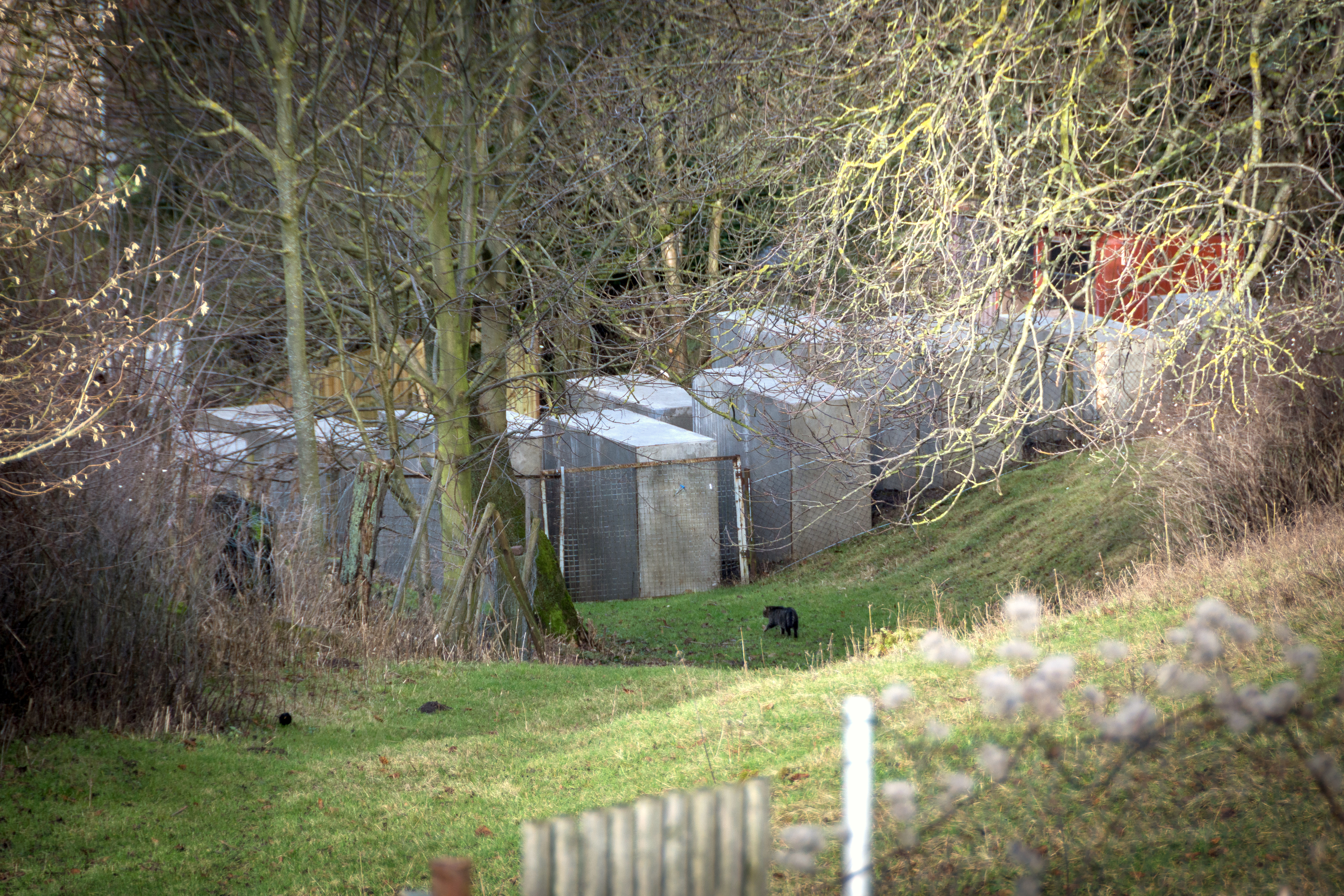
A replica of the Holocaust memorial was erected on the property adjacent to Höcke.

Höcke gave a speech in Dresden in January 2017, in which, referring to the Holocaust memorial in Berlin (the Memorial to the Murdered Jews of Europe), he stated that "we Germans are the only people in the world who have planted a memorial of shame in the heart of their capital," and suggested that Germans "need to make a 180-degree change in their commemoration policy."

The speech was widely criticized as antisemitic or neo-nazi by Jewish leaders in Germany, among others, and in response he was described by his party chairwoman, Frauke Petry, as a "burden to the party." As a result of his speech, the majority of leaders of the AfD asked in February 2017 that Björn Höcke be expelled from the party. In May 2018 an AfD tribunal ruled that Höcke was allowed to stay in the party.

After Höcke's "monument of shame" comment, the Center for Political Beauty, a Berlin-based art collective, erected a full-scale replica of one section of the Holocaust memorial in Berlin within viewing distance of Höcke's home in Bornhagen as a reminder of German history.

In an interview with The Wall Street Journal, Höcke claimed that "Hitler was regarded as only bad".

In March 2020 a video of Höcke emerged attacking critics of his Flügel Sachsen-Anhalt faction, in which he stated, "Die, die nicht in der Lage sind das Wichtigste zu leben, was wir zu leisten haben, nämlich die Einheit, dass die allmählich auch mal ausgeschwitzt werden" ("Those who are not able to live up to the most important thing we have to achieve, that being unity, they will gradually be sweated out"), with the verb "ausgeschwitzt" sounding similar to Auschwitz. The faction had been placed under surveillance by the Federal Office for the Protection of the Constitution shortly before the video surfaced.

=== Use of Nazi slogan ===
Björn Höcke was accused by the Halle (Saale) public prosecutor's office of having proclaimed the slogan: "Everything for our homeland, everything for Saxony-Anhalt, everything for Germany!" at the end of a speech he gave at an election event for his party in Merseburg on 29 May 2021. The slogan "Everything for Germany" ("Alles für Deutschland") was the motto of the SA and carved in daggers used by the SA. Its public use is punishable by law in Germany. Höcke claimed he did not know the origin of the saying, and argued he was "completely innocent." He was charged in September 2023 and convicted in May 2024. He was fined €13,000.

Höcke was said to have used the slogan again in December 2023, where he said: "Everything for…," to which the audience responded: "Germany!" In July 2024, Höcke was fined by a court in Halle again for using the Nazi slogan "Everything for Germany."

== "Bernd" Höcke ==
In March 2015 the newspaper Thüringer Allgemeine used "Bernd" erroneously as Höcke's first name. After Höcke complained publicly about the incident, the heute-show, a late night satirical news program, started to systematically use "Bernd" for his first name as a running gag. Later, other comedians adopted the idea, referring to him as "Bernd," also. The widespread use among comedians led to reporters and anchormen of various news media erroneously using "Bernd" on several occasions. In January 2018, even an original press release of the Bundestag accidentally used "Bernd," before it was corrected on the same day. In December 2020, the AfD of North Rhine-Westphalia accidentally invited journalists to a party event where "Herrn [Mr.] Bernd Höcke" would be present.

== Petition for ineligibility ==
In 2023, a petition was started with the intention to revoke Höcke's eligibility to run for parliament. The petition is based on article 18 of the German Constitution, which refers to the forfeiture of fundamental rights. The campaign network Campact started the petition and set the goal of collecting 1.7 million signatures to urge the German government to action. Legal scholar Gertrude Lübbe-Wolf first introduced the idea of using article 18 of the constitution to defend German democracy in a way that would be less radical than banning the whole political party (the AfD). It is now the largest German political petition to have ever existed.
