= Die Linke Saxony =

Die Linke Saxony Die Linke Sachsen
- Abbreviation: LINKE
- Chairman: Marco Böhme; Anja Eichhorn
- Deputy Chair: Anja Apel; Markus Pohle
- Founded: 15 July 2007; 19 years ago
- Headquarters: Dresden
- Membership (2026): 11,500 (July 2026)
- Ideology: Democratic socialism; Socialism
- Political position: Left
- National affiliation: Die Linke
- Colours: Purple
- Landtag of Saxony: 6 / 120

Website
- www.dielinke-sachsen.de

The Die Linke Saxony (German: Die Linke Sachsen; Upper Sorbian: Lěwica krajny zwjazk Sakska or Lěwica Sakska) is the regional state association of Die Linke (English: The Left) in the Free State of Saxony, Germany. The state chairpersons are Anja Eichhorn and Marco Böhme. The parliamentary group leader in the Landtag of Saxony is Susanne Schaper.

Until the end of 2017, The Left Party in Saxony was the largest state branch of the party in Germany. Since February 2025, with over 10,000 members, it has been the largest party in Saxony in terms of party membership.

== History ==
=== Founding ===
On 14-15 July 2007, the state branches of the Left Party (PDS) and the WASG merged in Chemnitz to form the Saxony branch of the Left Party. This followed a merger of the PDS and WASG at the federal level in Berlin on 16 June 2007. The merger was the culmination of a two-year process of cooperation, triggered by the snap federal election of 2005. The PDS, which by 2007 already had a long and turbulent history, and the WASG, which had emerged in connection with protests against the policies of the Social Democratic Party (SPD) and the Green Party, and especially against the passage of the so-called Hartz laws, were two very different partners. Drawing on their memories of previous mergers, key figures on both sides emphasized the importance of this union being conducted on an equal footing.

=== History of the WASG Saxony ===
An Extraordinary Congress of the SED (Socialist Unity Party of Germany) took place in Berlin on 8 and 9 December 1989. The crisis into which the then party and state leadership had led the country had made it inevitable, even if not all leading functionaries saw it that way. The party renamed itself SED-PDS and, from mid-January 1990, PDS (Party of Democratic Socialism).

The break with Stalinism as a system was a key message of this party congress. In the three Saxon districts, initiative groups and other grassroots movements emerged in the autumn of 1989 and early 1990. These groups understood the transformation of the party as a process of renewal, drove it forward, assumed responsibility, replaced the old leadership, and, together with representatives of other parties and newly formed political movements, discussed the future of the country at round tables. With the developments in Plauen, Dresden, and Leipzig, Saxony had become the driving force behind the process in the GDR in the autumn of 1989, a process whose non-violence astonished the world. The PDS inherited a difficult legacy with the legal succession of the SED (a matter of controversy even within the party). Even before the establishment of a new state association of the party, the newly forming Saxon district associations faced two major challenges: they had to confront their responsibility—also for their predecessor party—and simultaneously undertake the process of renewal. To this end, a preparatory conference for the re-establishment of a Saxon state association of the PDS took place in Dresden on 30 June 1990.

On 28/29 July 1990, the Saxony branch of the PDS (Party of Democratic Socialism) was founded in Leipzig at its first state delegates' conference. Klaus Bartl (Chemnitz) was elected chairman, and Ronald Weckesser (Dresden), Achim Last (Löbau), and Volker Külow (Leipzig) became his deputies. In the 1990 state election for the first Landtag of Saxony, the Left List.PDS, which was in an electoral alliance with the party "Die Nelken" (The Carnations), the Communist Party of Germany of Saxony, the Marxist Youth Association, and the United Left, received 10.2% of the vote and thus 17 seats in the new parliament. Klaus Bartl became parliamentary group leader. At the second party congress on December 7, 1991, in Leipzig, Peter Porsch was elected party chairman. In the following years, an internal process of clarification took place. Reform-oriented and left-conservative forces came together, enabling them to act politically jointly. Two party conferences and countless regional activities accompanied the further process of renewal. At the Markkleeberg party conference on 6 March 1994, the PDS Saxony adopted its own fundamental program, "Life in Human Dignity," supported by all factions. However, the internal party clarification process was also marked by numerous bitter personal and substantive disputes between the three city associations of Leipzig (Dietmar Pellmann), Chemnitz (Bartl), and Dresden (Ostrowski/Weckesser). In some cases, Peter Porsch, as state chairman, found it difficult to integrate the various factions.

Following the 1994 state election, the PDS entered the new state parliament with 16.5% of the vote and 21 seats. Peter Porsch was elected parliamentary group leader. Also in 1994, the PDS, with Horst-Dieter Brähmig, secured the first mayoralty in the Federal Republic of Germany, in Hoyerswerda. In the 1999 state election, the party increased its share of the vote to 22.2%, entering the state parliament with 30 seats and thus becoming the second-largest parliamentary group and leading opposition party in the Saxon state parliament. Peter Porsch was again elected parliamentary group leader and state chairman, and in the autumn of 2000 was also elected deputy chairman of the PDS at the federal level. In 2001, Cornelia Ernst took over as state chairwoman. "Creative opposition" and "debt-free socialism" became the slogans that characterized the policies of the PDS in Saxony.

In 2004, the PDS presented the Alternative State Development Concept (ALEKSA). In the 2004 state election, information about the PDS's lead candidate Peter Porsch's collaboration with the Stasi reduced the results (23.6%). The PDS again became the second-largest parliamentary group in the Saxon State Parliament with 31 members. For the first time, it won four direct mandates in Leipzig, Chemnitz, and Hoyerswerda. Porsch again became parliamentary group leader. As a result of developments nationwide, the PDS Saxony also began to pursue cooperation with the WASG in 2005. In July 2007, the PDS and the WASG merged to form The Left Party. At the same time, André Hahn, the long-time parliamentary manager of the parliamentary group, assumed the chairmanship of The Left parliamentary group in the Saxon State Parliament.

=== History of the PDS Saxony ===
On 3 July 2004, the association "Electoral Alternative for Labor and Social Justice" (Wahlalternative Arbeit und soziale Gerechtigkeit) was founded at the Bonhoeffer House in Berlin. From the outset, its stated goals included the establishment or transformation into a political party. Thirty-eight initiators from across Germany—including three from Saxony (Thomas Rudolph and Roger Schaumberg, Leipzig; Bernd Rump, Dresden)—signed the founding declaration. This formal act of founding was preceded by the development of an electoral alternative and an initiative for labour and social justice. Since the spring of 2004, open meetings had also been held in Saxony under the auspices of the IG Metall trade union, where the development of a new political organization had been discussed. Werner Kempter, the IG Metall representative, was appointed as the state coordinator.

On 2 June 2004, a working committee was established in Dresden, including Ulrich Stephan and Werner Kempter. Regional associations were set up in Leipzig, Dresden, the Chemnitz region, Freiberg, and Zwickau. Consultations between the various initiative groups led to the state meeting of the ASG Saxony in Chemnitz on 9 October 2004, and there to the founding of the WASG in Saxony. The executive committee, consisting of Michaela Ziegs, Petra Fischer, Monika Krüger, Werner Kempter, Manfred Hauser, Tilo Wirtz, and Christian Fischer, took over the further work. The WASG was particularly active in the demonstrations against Hartz IV, participating in protests against government policy with leaflet campaigns and vigils. At the same time, the public debate began regarding the party's fundamental political orientation and the first drafts of a basic political program..

Following a membership vote in which the majority opted to transform the association into a political party, the WASG constituted itself as a party on 22 January 2005. The official founding of the Saxony state association took place at the WASG's first state party conference on 18 June 2005. Petra Fischer (Dresden), Manfred Hauser (Zwickau), Tilo Wirtz (Dresden), and Enrico Stange (Leipzig) were elected to the executive committee. The state party conference also addressed preparations for the upcoming federal elections on September 18, 2005. A motion from the Leipzig district association, which rejected the candidacy of WASG candidates on the PDS's open lists, was central to the discussions. That evening, the state party conference voted overwhelmingly in favor of this motion. In the weeks that followed, district associations were established almost across the entire state of Saxony: in Bautzen, Riesa-Großenhain, Plauen, Weißwasser, Zwickau, Meissen, Stollberg, Freiberg.

Despite the party congress resolution of 18 June 2005, consultations between the PDS and WASG parties took place in Saxony following the final decision to hold early federal elections after the results of the Lower Saxony state elections in May 2005. The call from Oskar Lafontaine for both left-wing parties to join forces in the upcoming elections played a decisive role in these consultations. Following corresponding agreements at the federal level, these consultations led to a revision of the position adopted at the party congress and, consequently, to the candidacy of WASG candidates on open PDS lists in Saxony. On 3 December 2005, the state executive committees of both parties agreed to form a joint strategy group to prepare for a merger in Saxony, which was to be completed within 18 months. At two programmatic conventions on 7 October 2006, in Dresden and 21 January 2007, in Hof, progress was made toward a compromise and ultimately an agreement was reached.

== Organization and structure ==
The Left Party in Saxony is organized into grassroots groups and local associations. These form district associations, whose boundaries correspond to the ten rural districts and three independent cities. The highest body is the state party congress, which is elected for a two-year term. The most important leadership bodies of the party are the state executive committee and the state council.

The party organization also includes working groups, committees, and forums where party members and non-members interested in specific topics can officially unite. Such statewide associations include, among others, the State Working Group (LAG) on Antifascist Politics, the LAG on Businesses & Trade Unions, the LAG on Civil Rights and Democracy, the LAG on Peace and International Politics, the LAG on Unconditional Basic Income, the Women's Working Group LISA , the Marxistisches Forum, the LAG on Religion and Worldview Communities, the Forum on Democratic Socialism, the Socialist Left, the LAG on Left-Wing Entrepreneurs, and the LAG on Senior Citizens. Youth also occupies an important position within the party, with its State Youth Day. All members of the state association and party supporters up to the age of 27 can participate.

The Left Youth ('solid') is the state youth organization of the party. Within this organization, the university association Die Linke.SDS exists as a working group.

Politically affiliated educational associations include the Rosa Luxemburg Foundation, based in Leipzig with branches in Dresden and Chemnitz, the Saxony Municipal Policy Forum, the Saxony Youth Education Center and the youth association "Roter Baum".

OWUS Saxony is a politically affiliated, open business association.

== Membership ==
=== Party leaders: PDS Saxony and Die Linke Saxony ===
Term of office	Name	Party name
1990–1991	Klaus Bartl	PDS
1991–1995	Peter Porsch	PDS
1995–1997	Reinhard Lauter	PDS
1997–2001	Peter Porsch	PDS
2001–2009	Cornelia Ernst	PDS / Die Linke
2009–2017	Rico Gebhardt	Die Linke
2017–2019	Antje Feiks	Die Linke
2019–2025	Susanne Schaper & Stefan Hartmann	Die Linke
Since 2025	Anja Eichhorn & Marco Böhme	Die Linke

=== Parliamentary group leader in the Saxon Landtag ===
Term of office	Name	Fraktion
1990–1994	Klaus Bartl	Linke Liste PDS
1994–2005	Peter Porsch	PDS-Fraktion
2005–2007	Peter Porsch	Linksfraktion.PDS
2007–2012	André Hahn	Fraktion Die Linke
2012–2024	Rico Gebhardt	Fraktion Die Linke
Since 2024	Susanne Schaper	Fraktion Die Linke

=== State Managing Director ===
Term	Name
1991–1993	Martin Harnack
1993–1995	Ingrid Mattern
1995–1997	Michael Kretschmer
1997–1999	Ralf Eißler
1999–2009	Rico Gebhardt
2009–2017	Antje Feiks
2017–2019	Thomas Dudzak
2019–2021	Janina Pfau
Since 2021	Lars Kleba

== Election results ==
=== State elections ===
Results of the state elections
Year	Voices	Seats
1990 (Note: as LL/PDS (“Left List – PDS”))	10.2%	17 / 160
1994 (Note: as PDS (“Party of Democratic Socialism”))	16.5%	21 / 120
1999	22.2%	30 / 120
2004	23.6%	31 / 124
2009 (Note: as Die Linke)	20.6%	29 / 132
2014	18.9%	27 / 126
2019	10.4%	14 / 119
2024	4.5% (Note: Only through two direct mandates according to the basic mandate clause, because the five percent hurdle was not reached.)	6 / 120

=== Federal elections ===
Results of the federal elections
Year	First votes in %	Second votes in %	Mandates	Members
1990 (Note: as PDS ("Party of Democratic Socialism"))	9.2	9.0	4	Ulrich Briefs (until 1991, then unaffiliated), Uwe-Jens Heuer, Barbara Höll, Angela Stachowa
1994^{; (Note: Entered the Bundestag via the basic mandate clause)}	17.2	16.7	6	Heinrich von Einsiedel, Uwe-Jens Heuer, Barbara Höll, Heidemarie Lüth, Christina Schenk, Steffen Tippach
1998	19.7	20.0	8	Klaus Grehn, Barbara Höll, Evelyn Kenzler, Heidemarie Lüth, Christine Ostrowski, Christina Schenk, Gustav-Adolf Schur, Ilja Seifert
2002	17.7	16.2	–	–
2005	22.3	22.8	8	Barbara Höll, Katja Kipping, Monika Knoche, Michael Leutert, Ilja Seifert, Axel Troost, Jörn Wunderlich, Sabine Zimmermann
2009	24.2	24.5	8	Barbara Höll, Katja Kipping, Caren Lay, Michael Leutert, Ilja Seifert, Axel Troost, Jörn Wunderlich, Sabine Zimmermann
2013	21.5	20.0	8	André Hahn, Susanna Karawanskij, Katja Kipping, Caren Lay, Michael Leutert, Axel Troost, Jörn Wunderlich, Sabine Zimmermann
2017	17.5	16.1	6	André Hahn, Katja Kipping, Caren Lay, Michael Leutert (until 2021, successor Axel Troost), Sören Pellmann, Sabine Zimmermann
2021	11.5	9.3	4	André Hahn, Katja Kipping (until 2022, successor Clara Bünger), Caren Lay, Sören Pellmann
2025	12.8	11.3	4	Clara Bünger, Caren Lay, Sören Pellmann, Zada Salihović

== Literature ==
- Gero Neugebauer: Die PDS in Sachsen. In: Christian Demuth, Jakob Lempp: Parteien in Sachsen. be.bra wissenschaft verlag, Berlin 2006, ISBN 978-3-937233-35-2, S. 121–144. (2. Auflage 2007) (online: Sonderausgabe der Sächsische Landeszentrale für politische Bildung (2006)
