= Four percent threshold =

Results of all National Council elections in Austria since 1994. The dashed line indicates the four percent threshold.

The term four percent threshold (German: Vier-Prozent-Hürde) refers to a threshold clause in elections to the Austrian National Council, introduced in 1992 with the amendment to the National Council Election Regulations (Federal Law Gazette No. 471/1992). This threshold clause also applies to Austrian European elections, according to Section 77, Paragraph 2 of the European Election Regulations (EuWO), meaning that parties receiving less than 4% of the valid votes cast nationwide are not entitled to any seats.

The same threshold is used for local elections.

== Background ==
The National Council Election Regulations (NRWO) divide the federal territory into nine state constituencies, each geographically corresponding to one of the nine Austrian federal states. Based on the results of the last census, each state constituency is allocated a specific number of seats. The least populous state constituency, Burgenland, currently holds seven of the total 183 National Council seats; Lower Austria, the most populous state constituency, holds 37 seats. The number of valid votes cast in each state constituency is divided by the number of seats allocated to that state constituency. The result of this division is called the electoral quota for the respective state constituency and represents the number of votes required to secure a seat for the constituency's representation in the National Council.

Each state constituency is further subdivided into two to seven regional constituencies.

The allocation of mandates to parties takes place in three steps:

- In the first of the three so-called allocation procedures, the number of valid votes a particular party received in a specific regional constituency is divided by the electoral quota of the state constituency to which that regional constituency belongs. The quotient is rounded down. The result represents the number of so-called basic mandates that the party in question wins in that regional constituency. If not all participating parties have received vote counts in all regional constituencies that are exact integer multiples of the applicable electoral quota, not all available seats can be allocated in this first round.
- In the second round of the allocation process, the number of valid votes received by a particular party in a specific state constituency is divided by the electoral quota for that constituency. The quotient is rounded down and reduced by the total number of direct mandates awarded to that party in that constituency. The result represents the number of so-called residual seats or remaining vote seats that the party wins in that constituency. Even after this round, it is almost certain that not all seats have yet been allocated.
- In the third and final stage of the election process, the number of valid votes a particular party has received nationwide is converted into a total number of seats using the D'Hondt method. If this total exceeds the number of basic and residual seats the party received in the first two rounds, it receives a corresponding number of additional residual seats. Conversely, if the party has already received more basic and residual seats in the first two rounds than it would be entitled to in the third round alone, correspondingly fewer additional residual seats are allocated to other parties.

According to § 100 para. 1 and § 107 para. 2 NRWO, only those parties that either received a basic mandate in the first investigation procedure or have amassed at least 4 percent of the valid votes cast nationwide participate in the distribution of residual mandates through the second and third investigation procedures.

== Significance of the blocking clause and the basic mandate ==
The allocation of seats at the regional constituency level is possible independently of the nationwide four percent threshold. A seat won in this way is called a basic mandate. Depending on the size of the regional constituency, it is more or less difficult to win a basic mandate: the larger the number of votes cast (in relation to the electoral quota), the lower the relative share of votes a party needs to receive a basic mandate.

In the 2019 Austrian legislative election, eight parties failed to reach the four percent threshold. Dividing the number of valid votes per federal state by the number of seats to be allocated in the federal states showed that the electoral quota ranged from approximately 23,000 to 27,800, depending on the federal state. This is the number of votes required in a constituency to win a basic mandate. Accordingly, in the Greater Graz constituency (9 seats to be allocated), approximately 11.2% of the votes would have been necessary for a basic mandate, while in the East Tyrol regional constituency (one seat), it was approximately 92.6%. In most constituencies, between 15% and 30% of the valid votes were required for a basic mandate. The percentage is essentially the inverse of the number of seats to be allocated in the constituency, but this is altered by rounding differences in the determination of the number of seats to be allocated per federal state or per regional constituency, as well as by varying voter turnout in the regional constituencies within a federal state. If these differences are disregarded, 1/183 of the votes cast would be necessary for a seat, but then all votes would have to come from one and the same regional constituency.

In practice, securing a direct mandate is considerably more difficult than achieving four percent of the nationwide vote. It has never happened that a party that failed to clear the four percent threshold nevertheless won a direct mandate. In all recent cases where a small party's entry into the National Council was considered conceivable but uncertain, the four percent threshold was the predominant topic of discussion during the election campaign and in the actual election coverage. The fact that it is possible to fail to clear the four percent threshold but still enter the National Council via a direct mandate is therefore virtually unknown to the general public.

However, the issue became relevant during the 2006 Austrian legislative election campaign, as the Alliance for the Future of Austria (BZÖ) was polling close to 4% in all polls and they hoped to win a direct mandate in Carinthia due to its strong support there. However on election night, they narrowly missed winning a direct mandate, but still just barely cleared the four percent threshold.

In the 2024 European Parliament election, both the KPÖ (2.96%) and DNA (2.72%) failed to clear the Austrian four percent threshold, while in Germany, 15 of the 96 seats went to parties with ≤ 2.7% of the vote. However, even without a threshold clause, none of the 20 seats would have been allocated to the KPÖ or DNA using the D'Hondt allocation method as used in Austria.

If, however, the four percent threshold is exceeded in National Council elections, the electoral law stipulates at least party strength (Klub), i.e. at least five seats for the respective group.

== Blocking clauses in Austria at the municipal level ==
In Austria, besides Vienna, which is also a federal state, only one other municipality has introduced a threshold clause for municipal elections: In Innsbruck, following a resolution by the Landtag of Tyrol in October 2023, a four percent threshold applies for entering the municipal council after municipal elections. The first election for which this threshold applied took place in April 2024 and resulted in five of the 13 participating lists failing to win seats on the Innsbruck municipal council.

== See also ==
- Closed list
- Open list
- Five percent hurdle
