= Dual mandate (disambiguation) =

A dual mandate in politics is serving in multiple public positions simultaneously.

Dual mandate may also refer to:

- In the monetary policy of the United States, the Federal Reserve's twin objectives of controlling inflation and promoting employment
- The Dual Mandate in British Tropical Africa, 1922 book by Frederick Lugard

== See also ==
- Mandate (disambiguation)
