= Group status in German state parliaments =

The following list provides an overview of the minimum requirements that must be met in each federal state of Germany for an association of members of the corresponding state parliament to receive the status of either a recognized parliamentary group (Fraktion) or a lesser group (Gruppe).

== List ==
State Parliament	Minimum requirements
Baden-Württemberg	6 MPs from one party.
Bavaria	Members of a party that obtained at least 5 percent of the total number of votes and at least five seats in the previous state election.
Berlin	As many MPs from a party or MPs nominated by a party as candidates for election that they correspond to at least 5 percent of the minimum number of members in the House of Representatives (subject to the approval of the House of Representatives, also MPs who do not belong to the same party or are nominated by the same party as candidates have been nominated). It is possible for fewer MPs to form a group.
Brandenburg	5 MPs from a party, political association or list association or MPs who have been nominated as candidates for election by a party/political association/list association. A parliamentary group can also consist of 4 MPs if their party/political association/list association achieved a total second vote share of at least five percent in the previous state election. (A different composition is also possible subject to the approval of the Landtag) It is possible for at least 3 MPs to form a group.
Bremen	5 MPs from a party or MPs nominated by a party as candidates for election. (A different composition is also possible subject to the approval of the parliament) The merger of at least 3 MPs into a group is possible.
Hamburg	So many deputies that they correspond to at least 5 percent of the minimum number of members of the citizenship. Fewer MPs can form a group if the MPs have at least one seat on a committee.
Hesse	5 MPs are needed to form a group.
Lower Saxony	Members of a party who, in the previous state election, achieved the proportion of the total number of votes required by the state elections law. (5 percent).
Mecklenburg-Vorpommern	4 MPs are needed to form a group.
North Rhine-Westphalia	The group must have obtained at least 5 percent of the members of the state parliament. (Exceptions can be decided by the state parliament.)
Rhineland-Palatinate	Members of a party that was elected to the state parliament in the previous election (5 percent of the second votes, ie proportional representation votes, are required for this).
Saarland	2 MPs are needed to form a group.
Saxony	7 MPs from a party or MPs who were elected to the state parliament on the basis of party nominations. (The deputies of a party or the deputies who were elected to the Landtag on the basis of a party's nominations may not form several factions.)
Saxony-Anhalt	5 MPs from a party or list association or MPs who have been nominated by a party/list association as candidates for election, whereby the party/list association must have achieved the required share of the total number of votes according to the state election law in the previous state election (5 percent). (A different composition is also possible with the approval of the Landtag.)
Schleswig-Holstein	The party must have obtained at least 4 members in the state parliament. (Subject to the approval of the Landtag, members of parliament who do not belong to the same party can also join forces.) However the member(s) of the South Schleswig Voters' Association representing the Danish minority are entitled to the rights of a parliamentary group.
Thuringia	The party or list must have obtained at least 5 percent of the minimum number of members in the state parliament.

== Comparisons with the federal parliament ==
For comparison: In the German Bundestag, a parliamentary group is formed by at least five percent of the members of the Bundestag, with at least three MPs and fewer than five percent of the seats, a group is spoken of. There are currently six parliamentary groups in the Bundestag.
