= Mandate =

Mandate most often refers to:

- League of Nations mandates, quasi-colonial territories established under Article 22 of the Covenant of the League of Nations, 28 June 1919
- Mandate (politics), the power granted by an electorate

Mandate may also refer to:

- Mandate (aftershave), British aftershave brand
- Mandate (criminal law), an official or authoritative command; an order or injunction
- Mandate (international law), an obligation handed down by an inter-governmental body
- Mandate (magazine), a monthly gay pornographic magazine
- Mandate (trade union), a trade union in Ireland
- HMS Mandate, various ships of Britain's navy
- Mandate (typeface), a brash-brush typeface designed by R. Hunter Middleton
- The formal notice of decision from an appellate court
- A requirement for a health maintenance organization to provide a particular product

== See also ==
- Contract of mandate, a contract of bailment of goods without reward, to be carried from place to place, or to have some act performed about them
- Individual mandate, an often controversial government requirement for the purchase of goods by individuals
- Mandate of Heaven, a traditional Chinese concept of legitimacy used to support the rule of the kings of the Shang Dynasty and later the Emperors of China
- Basic mandate, an aspect of the electoral system
- Divine mandate, a political and religious doctrine
- North Atlantic mandates, aspect of the Danish electoral system
- Mandatory
