= Parliamentary group (Germany) =

A parliamentary group (German: Gruppe) in Germany is an association of several members of a parliament, especially in the Bundestag, whose number does not reach the minimum size of a fraktion. The rights of a group are usually limited compared to a fraktion, but the group has more rights than an Independent Member of Parliament.

Until March 2025, there were two groups in the German Bundestag, the Die Linke group with 28 members and the BSW group with ten members. Until 2024 there were two groups in the German state parliaments, the FDP group in Thuringia and the BVB/FW group in Brandenburg.

== Description ==
The minimum number of MPs required to form a group and the rights of the group are regulated differently in each legislature. The legal provisions can be found in the respective rules of procedure of the respective parliament or in a separate parliamentary group law. Legislators who do not reach the size of a parliamentary group can join to form a group. A group can be formed, for example, by members of a party who enter parliament on the basis of a basic mandate clause (Basic mandate) without passing the five percent hurdle. A group can also be formed if a parliamentary group dissolves because it does not meet the minimum size or if several MPs leave a party through crossing the floor.

The rights of a parliamentary group always remain the prerogative of the parliamentary group. The Rules of Procedure of the German Bundestag do not contain any detailed regulations in this regard; rather, the Bundestag determines the rights of the group in detail between when it recognises the group and when it does not. As an association without partial legal capacity, groups cannot assert parliamentary rights of the Bundestag in their own name. For example, they do not have the right to ask major questions, minor questions or to request a current affairs hour. Groups also receive significantly less money and speaking time than parliamentary groups in the Bundestag. Groups have no right to cite a member of the government to appear in the Bundestag and no right to a roll-call vote or to request a headcount in the Bundestag.

In contrast, the parliamentary group law for the Hamburg Parliament regulates in detail the group's right to representation in committees and also to proportional funding in accordance with the regulations for parliamentary groups. According to Section 11 of the Rhineland-Palatinate parliamentary group law, state funding for associations of non-affiliated MPs takes place following a resolution of the state parliament. According to Section 11 of the Landtag of Rhineland-Palatinate parliamentary group law, state funding for associations of non-affiliated MPs takes place following a resolution of the state parliament.

== Groups in the German Bundestag ==
Groups in the Bundestag (explanatory video from tagesschau)

In the German Bundestag, according to Section 10 Paragraph 4 of the Rules of Procedure of the German Bundestag, a group can be recognised if its members do not reach the minimum parliamentary group size.

Groups were not initially provided for in the rules of procedure. However, as early as the third meeting, the National Rights group was formed from five members, which later renamed itself the German Reich Party group, grew to nine representatives in the meantime and disbanded in September 1950. After the All-German Bloc/League of Expellees and Deprived of Rights (BHE) was founded in October 1950, five representatives formed the BHE/DG group. Four of the BHE members came from the Economic Reconstruction Association (WAV) fraktion, which lost its faction status and also acted as a group until December 1951.

Groups have been provided for in the Rules of Procedure of the German Bundestag since January 1952. At the same time, the minimum size of a parliamentary group was increased from ten to 15 members. With the increase in the minimum size of parliamentary groups, the parliamentary fraktion of the Communist Party of Germany lost its parliamentary status and formed a group. In April 1953, five members of the WAV formed a group again.

On 14 July 1955, a group of former members of the GB/BHE parliamentary group, the so-called Kraft/Oberländer group, was founded in the 2nd German Bundestag. All members joined the CDU/CSU faction as guests the following day. On 15 March 1956, 14 MPs left the Free Democratic Party (FDP) and formed the Working Group of Free Democrats, later the Democratic Working Group. From October 26, 1956, this group had 15 members and thus parliamentary group status; it was finally called the Bundestag parliamentary group of the Free People's Party. This group also formed a technical working group with the DP parliamentary group, with which it eventually merged. In the 3rd German Bundestag, the German Party parliamentary group lost its parliamentary group status on 1 July 1960 when nine members left; the remaining six members formed a group. In 1961, more MPs left the DP, and the three remaining members of the party, now called Gesamtdeutsche Partei (GDP), remained without a parliamentary group. At the beginning of the 5th Bundestag, the minimum size of a parliamentary group was set at five percent of the MPs.

The 24 representatives from the Party of Democratic Socialism (PDS) who were members of the 11th German Bundestag after reunification on October 3, 1989, formed a group. In the 12th German Bundestag (1990–94), Alliance 90/The Greens with eight seats and the PDS with 17 seats each formed a group. Both parties had only overcome the barrier clause in the eastern electoral district, a special rule for the first election after reunification.

In the 13th German Bundestag (1994–98), the PDS was again represented as a group with 30 representatives. The party had missed the five percent hurdle, but entered the Bundestag through the basic mandate clause. In contrast, the two PDS representatives Gesine Lötzsch and Petra Pau, who were directly elected to the 15th Bundestag in the 2002 federal election, were denied recognition as a group due to the small size of the planned group.

Following the decision to dissolve the Die Linke faction on 6 December 2023, the 28 remaining members of Die Linke were granted group status on 2 February 2024. The ten members of the Bündnis Sahra Wagenknecht, who had previously left the Die Linke, were also recognised as a group on 2 February 2024. After the 2025 federal election both groups were dissolved, the BSW lost all its seats and Die Linke once again formed a faction.

Official groups in the German Bundestag
Name	Members	Time of existence	Reason for establishment	Reason for dissolution
Deutsche Reichspartei	5–9	15 September 1949 to 18 September 1951		Disintegration of the group
BHE/DG	5	13 October 1950 to 21 March 1952	Founding of the BHE	Too few members after death of a member
KPD	14	1 January 1952 to 7 September 1953	Increasing the minimum fraction size	Retired after the 1953 federal election
WAV	5	29 April 1953 to 7 September 1953		Retired after the 1953 federal election
Gruppe Kraft/Oberländer	7	14 to 15 July 1955	Withdrawal from GB/BHE group	Guest of the CDU/CSU faction
Demokratische Arbeitsgemeinschaft	16	15 March 1956 to 15 October 1956	Leaving the FDP parliamentary group	Formation of the FVP faction
DP Gruppe	6	1 July 1960 to 3 May 1961	Dissolution of the DP faction	Disbanded after resignations
Gruppe Bündnis 90/Die Grünen	8	20 December 1990 to 10 November 1994	Overcoming the barrier clause (only) in the Eastern electoral district	Fraktion after the 1994 federal election
PDS Gruppe	24	3 October 1990 to 20 December 1990	Deputies from the People's Chamber after reunification	
PDS Gruppe	17	20 December 1990 to 10 November 1994	Overcoming the electoral threshold (only) in the Eastern electoral district	
PDS Gruppe	30	10 November 1994 to 26 October 1998	Collection through basic mandate clause	Fraktion after the 1998 federal election
Gruppe Die Linke	28	2 February 2024 to 25 March 2025	Dissolution of the Die Linke faction	Fraktion after the 2025 federal election
Gruppe BSW	10	2 February 2024 to 25 March 2025	Dissolution of the Die Linke faction	Retired after the 2025 federal election

== Groups in German state parliaments ==
From January 2024 to September 2024, there was a FDP parliamentary group in Thüringia and a BVB/FW group in Brandenburg. In both cases, one MP had resigned from the previously existing parliamentary groups.

In the Landtag of Brandenburg, the three members of the BVB/FW fought for group rights before the Constitutional Court of Brandenburg in the summer of 2016. The BVB/FW entered the state parliament in the 2014 Brandenburg state election through the basic mandate clause. The group dissolved in September 2017. After losing the special fraktion status it had acquired after the 2019 Brandenburg state election in November 2023, the BVB/FW reconstituted itself as a group in December 2023.

In the Bürgerschaft of Bremen, after the defection of an SPD representative, a two-member group of Citizens in Rage (BIW) existed from October 2013 to June 2015. From June 2017 to June 2019 there was a BIW group of three parliamentarians, two of whom had defected to the BIW. Before that, after the 2015 state election, there was an AfD group of four members from June 2015 to June 2017, which was later renamed the Bremer Bürgerliche Reformer and, with one member less, the ALFA Group Bremen or the Group Liberal-Conservative Reformers. Three months after the 2019 state election, at the beginning of September, three of the five AfD MPs left the AfD parliamentary group and formed the Magnitz, Runge, Felgenträger group.

In the Landtag of Schleswig-Holstein, the South Schleswig Voters' Association which represents the Danish minority in Germany, has had the rights of a parliamentary group since 1955. The SSW has been represented in the state parliament since 1958, from 2009 to 2012 and since 2022 in parliamentary group strength.

In the Hamburg Parliament, a parliamentary group must be large enough to be entitled to at least one committee mandate. This currently does not apply to the incumbent two FDP MPs.

In some state parliaments, no special status is provided for groups. For example, from 2017 to 2019, the members of the Blue Party in the Landtag of Saxony (five members) and in the Landtag of North Rhine-Westphalia (three members) each referred to themselves as the Blue Group , but were not officially recognized as a group by the respective parliament.
