= 1999 Saxony state election =

State election in Saxony, Germany

← 1994	19 September 1999	2004 →

All 120 seats in the Landtag of Saxony 61 seats needed for a majority
- Turnout: 2,164,072 (61.1%) ▲2.7 pp
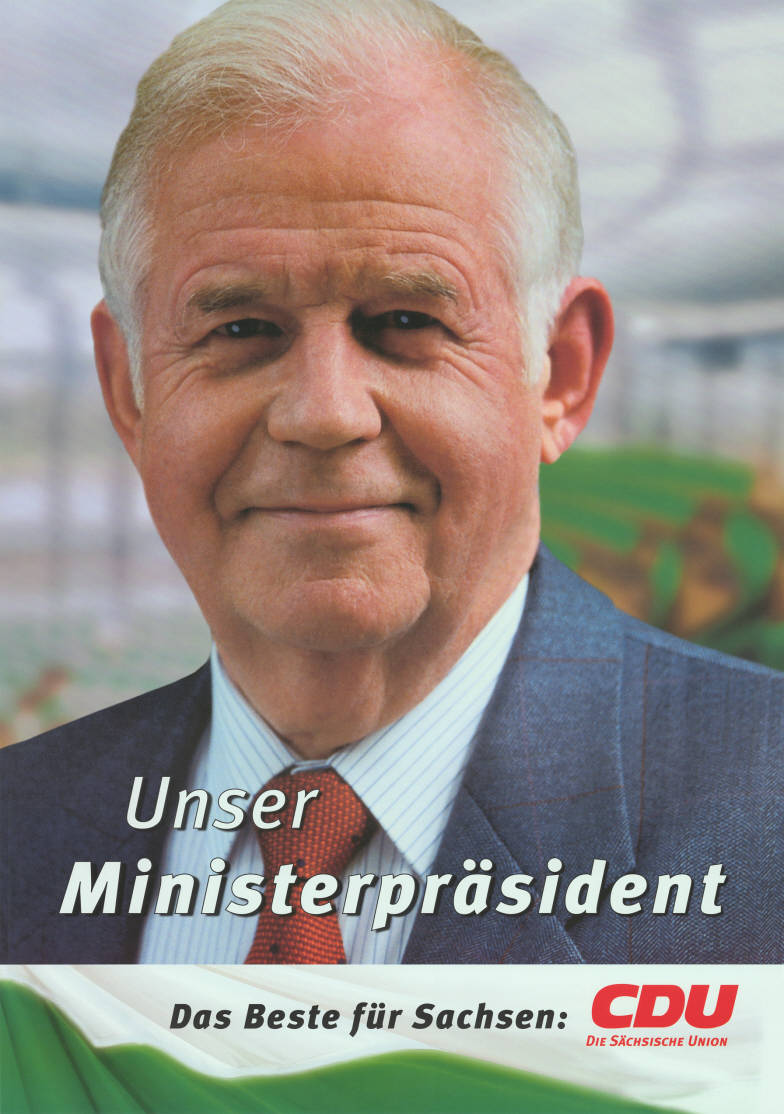

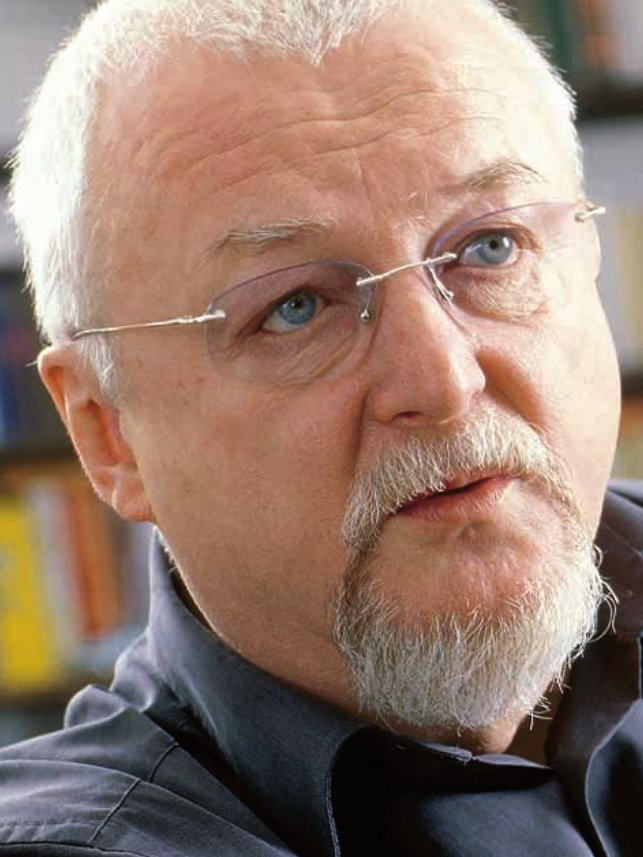

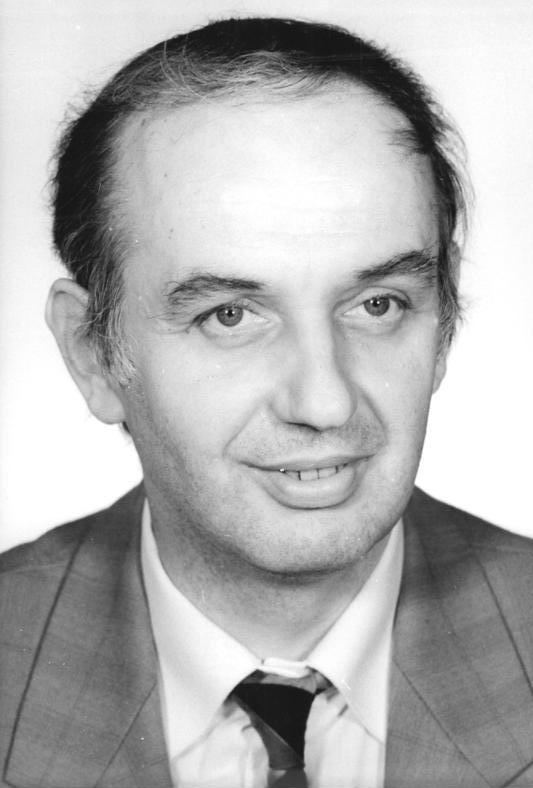
	First party	Second party	Third party
Leader	Kurt Biedenkopf	Peter Porsch	Karl-Heinz Kunckel
Party	CDU	PDS	SPD
Last election	77 seats, 58.1%	21 seats, 16.5%	22 seats, 16.6%
Seats won	76	30	14
Seat change	▼1	▲9	▼8
Popular vote	1,231,254	480,317	204,438
Percentage	56.9%	22.2%	10.7%
Swing	▼1.2 pp	▲5.7 pp	▼5.9 pp
- Results for the single-member constituencies
Minister-President before election
Kurt Biedenkopf
CDU
Elected Minister-President
Kurt Biedenkopf
CDU

The 1999 Saxony state election was held on 19 September 1999 to elect the members of the 3rd Landtag of Saxony. The incumbent Christian Democratic Union (CDU) government led by Minister-President Kurt Biedenkopf retained its majority and continued in office.

As of 2024, this is the most recent Saxony state election, where a party received more than 50% of the vote. Every Saxony state election since 1999, The CDU has seen its support in elections decrease.

== Parties ==
The table below lists parties represented in the 2nd Landtag of Saxony.

Name		Ideology	Leader(s)	1994 result	
Name		Ideology	Leader(s)	Votes (%)	Seats
CDU	Christian Democratic Union of Germany; Christlich Demokratische Union Deutschlands	Christian democracy	Kurt Biedenkopf	58.1%	77 / 120
SPD	Social Democratic Party of Germany; Sozialdemokratische Partei Deutschlands	Social democracy	Karl-Heinz Kunckel	16.6%	22 / 120
PDS	Party of Democratic Socialism; Partei des Demokratischen Sozialismus	Democratic socialism	Peter Porsch	16.5%	21 / 120

== Opinion polling ==
Polling firm	Fieldwork date	Sample size	CDU	SPD	PDS	Grüne	FDP	Others	Lead
1999 state election	19 Sep 1999	–	56.9	10.7	22.2	2.6	1.1	6.5	34.7
Infratest dimap	Sep 1999	–	57	16	18	3	1	5	39
Emnid	Jul–Aug 1999	1,132	53	18	19	3	2	5	34
Infratest dimap	Aug 1999	–	54	16	20	3	2	5	34
Infratest Burke	Jul–Aug 1999	900	57	20	17	2	1	3	37
1999 European election	13 Jun 1999	–	54.5	14.0	18.4	3.0	2.5	7.6	36.1
Infratest Burke	Apr–May 1999	900	52	17	22	3	2	4	35
Emnid	Apr 1999	1,028	49	21	19	4	2	5	28
Infratest Burke	Mar 1999	900	51	24	18	4	1	2	27
Emnid	Dec 1998	–	43	26	19	4	2	6	17
1998 federal election	27 Sep 1998	–	32.8	29.1	20.0	4.4	3.6	10.2	3.7
Emnid	Nov 1997	–	44	22	19	8	2	5	22
Emnid	Nov 1996	–	49	19	18	8	1	5	30
Emnid	Mar 1996	–	53	14	19	7	1	6	34
Emnid	Jun 1995	–	50	16	19	6	4	5	31
Emnid	Jan 1995	–	55	18	19	4	1	3	36
1994 state election	11 Sep 1994	–	58.1	16.6	16.5	4.1	1.7	2.9	41.5

== Election result ==

Summary of the 19 September 1999 election results for the Landtag of Saxony
Party	Votes	%	+/-	Seats	+/-	Seats %
Christian Democratic Union (CDU)	1,231,254	56.9	▼1.2	76	▼1	63.3
Party of Democratic Socialism (PDS)	480,317	22.2	▲5.7	30	▲9	25.0
Social Democratic Party (SPD)	232,311	10.7	▼5.9	14	▼8	11.7
Alliance 90/The Greens (Grüne)	55,609	2.6	▼1.5	0	±0	0
Pro Deutsche Mark (Pro DM)	46,469	2.1	▲2.1	0	±0	0
The Republicans (REP)	32,793	1.5	▲0.2	0	±0	0
National Democratic Party (NPD)	29,593	1.4	▲1.4	0	±0	0
Free Democratic Party (FDP)	23,369	1.1	▼0.6	0	±0	0
Others	32,357	1.5		0	±0	0
Total	2,164,072	100.0		120	±0	
Voter turnout		61.1	▲2.7			

Popular Vote
CDU	59.60%
PDS	22.20%
SPD	10.73%
B'90/GRÜNE	2.57%
Other	7.61%

Landtag seats
CDU	63.33%
PDS	25.00%
SPD	11.67%
