= Mandatory =

Mandatory may refer to:

- Mandatory (company)
- Mandatory (typeface)

== See also ==
- Mandate
