= Cornelia Ernst =

German politician and Member of the European Parliament (born 1956)

Cornelia Ernst MEP
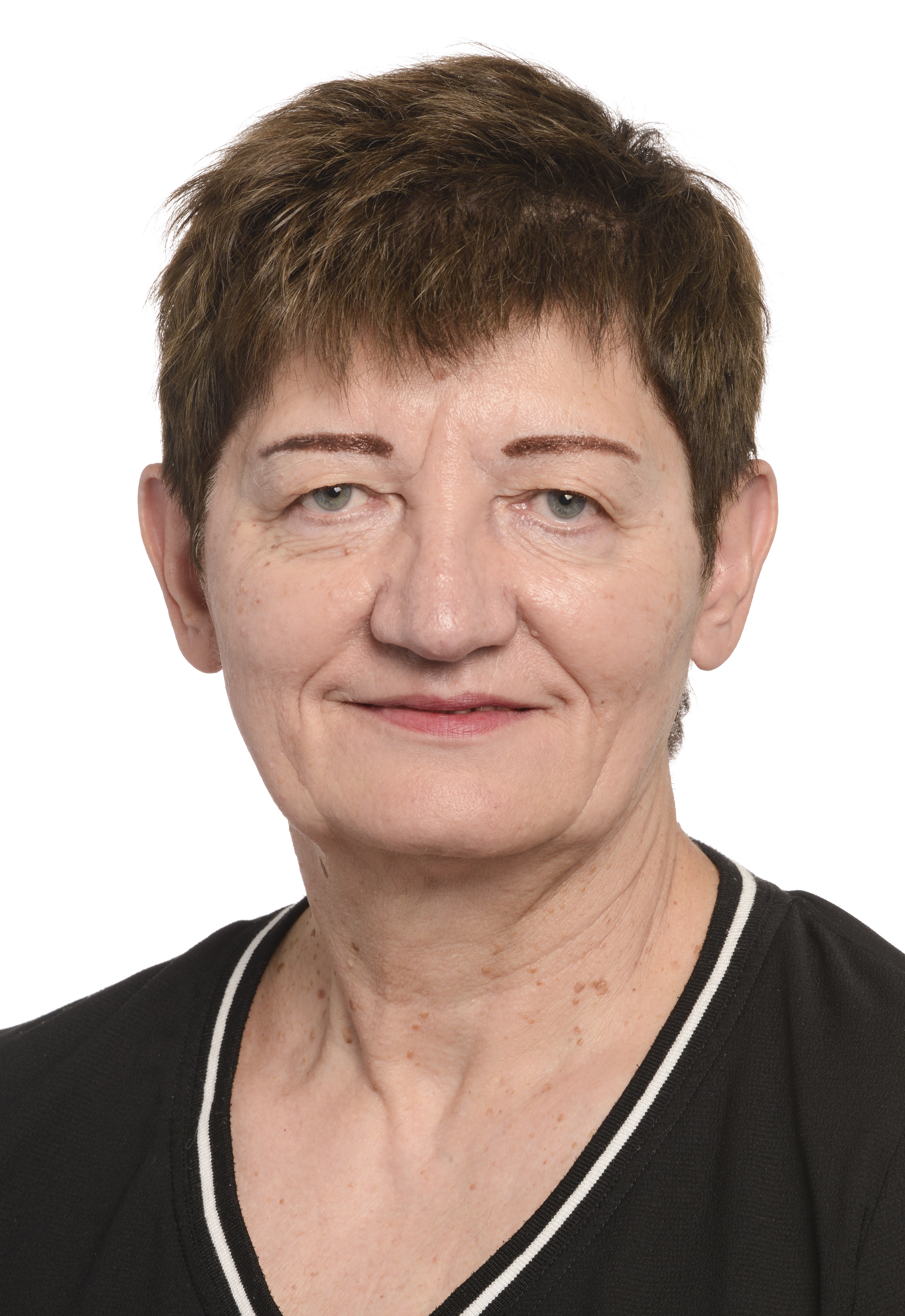

Member of the European Parliament
- Incumbent
- Assumed office 14 July 2009
- Constituency: Germany

Personal details
- Born: 30 November 1956 (age 69) Bad Saarow, East Germany
- Party: German; The Left Party; EU; European United Left–Nordic Green Left
- Website: www.cornelia-ernst.de

Cornelia Ernst (born 30 November 1956) is a German politician and Member of the European Parliament (MEP) from Germany. She is a member of The Left Party, part of the European United Left–Nordic Green Left.

She was elected to the European Parliament in 2009, prior to which she had been a member of the Parliament of Saxony from 1998. From 2007 till 2009 she had been the regional chairman of the Left Party in Saxony. On 15 February 2014 she got voted on place 3 of the group of nominated candidates of the Left party for the European Parliament and was re-elected to the European Parliament in 2014.

== Life and work ==
After graduating from secondary school in 1974 and her entry into the SED she finished her degree/diploma in education science in 1979. Ernst got her PhD in 1983 at Leipzig University with the thesis on "Zur Geschichte des Internationalen Frauentages in der Übergangsperiode vom Kapitalismus zum Sozialismus auf dem Gebiet der DDR (1945/46 - 1961)" (English: The history of the International Women's Day in the transition period from capitalism to socialism on the territory of the GDR (1945/46 - 1961) and was a teachers trainer at the departement for teachers training in Großenhain.

== Political career ==
From 1991 until 1999 Ernst had been a parliamentary advisor for the state parliamentary group of the PDS in Saxony and substitute chairman of the PDS in Saxony.

She became a Member of the Parliament of Saxony in 1998. In November 2001 Ernst got elected as chairman, as successor of Peter Porsch. After the merger of WASG and PDS forming the party DIE LINKE she got elected as chairman of the state association of DIE LINKE in Saxony. In state parliament she was a member of the committee for Home Affairs and a member of the committee for Constitutional, Legal and European Affairs. As local politician she also was a member of the City Council in Dresden.

Since 2009 Ernst is a Member of European Parliament. In her first term she was on the board of the Confederal Group of the European United Left/Nordic Green Left, a member of the Committee on Civil Liberties, Justice and Home Affairs, a substitute on the Committee on Regional Development and the Committee on Women's Rights and Gender Equality and a Member of the Delegation for relations with Iran. After the reelection in 2014 she stayed in the Committee on Civil Liberties, Justice and Home Affairs and became a substitute on the Committee on Industry, Research and Energy. Additionally to the Iran delegation she became a Member of the Delegation for relations with Bosnia and Herzegovina, and Kosovo. And got elected as the speaker of the German Delegation of Left party.
