= Basic mandate =

The Basic mandate (German: Grundmandat) is intended to represent regional or positional minorities in parliamentary systems in the Germanosphere. They can take very different forms and functions.

== Right to vote ==
=== Germany ===
The term "basic mandate" describes different situations in Germany:

1. In federal elections and some state elections, basic mandates are an alternative way of overcoming the electoral threshold clause in mixed-member proportional representation (basic mandate clause)
2. In the Kommunalparlament, basic mandates are seats on committees with limited rights for council members who are not affiliated with any party or who come from smaller parties (Grundmandatsträger).
3. In political parties and associations, delegate allocations with basic mandates serve to ensure the representation of member associations with few members at party or association conferences.

==== Bundestag ====
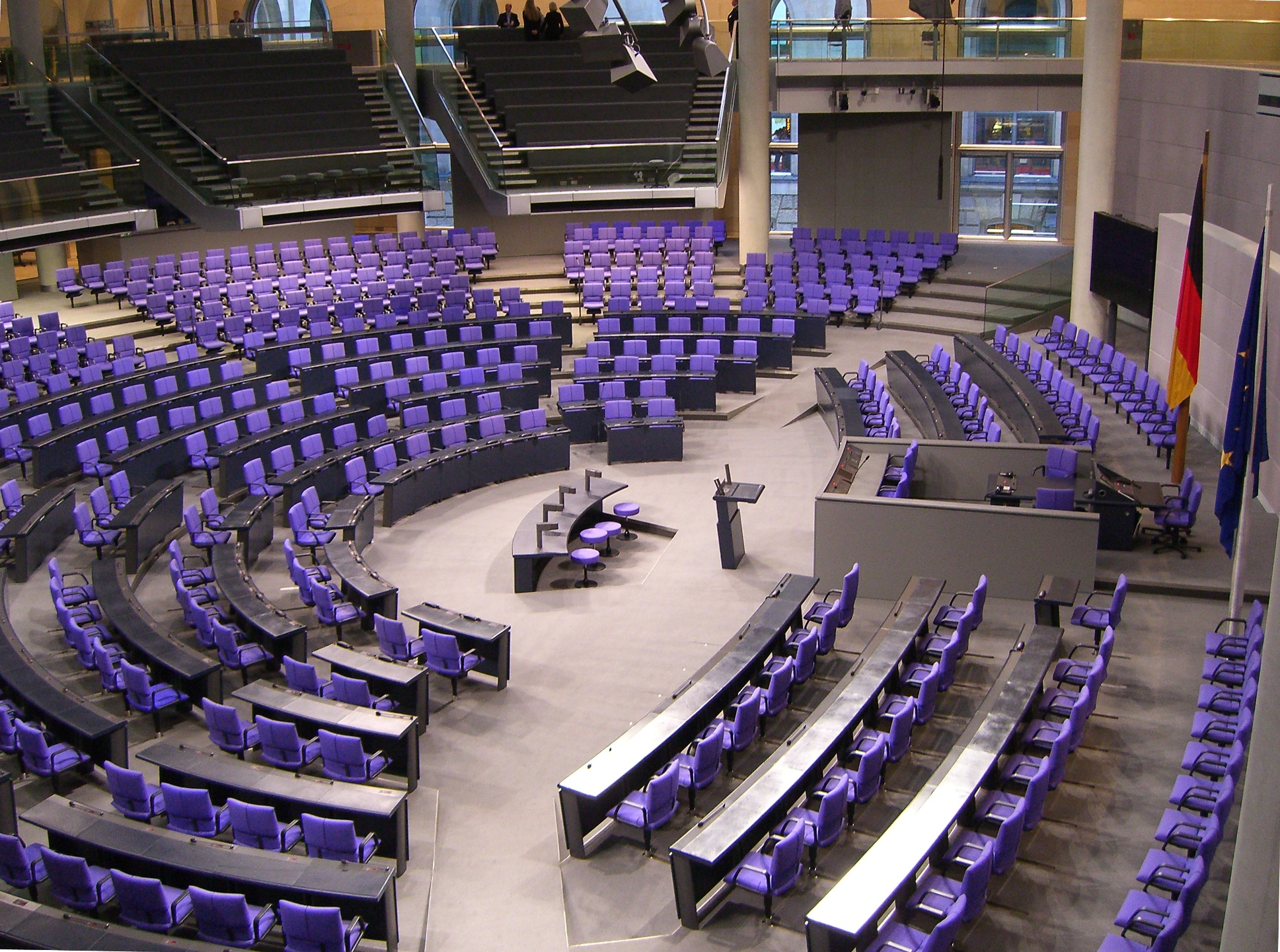
The basic mandate is used for elections to the Bundestag.

After the Second World War, the legislature decided to create a five percent threshold for elections to the German Bundestag in order to reduce excessive differentiation of the party system and the associated difficulties in forming a stable government.

To this day, only parties representing a recognized national minority or those entering the Bundestag via direct mandates are exempt from this five percent rule. If a party wins a certain minimum number of direct mandates, it enters parliament with a number of seats proportional to its share of the second vote, even if it does not clear the five percent threshold. In the Bundestag elections of the early 1950s, winning just one direct mandate was sufficient. Later, the minimum number of direct mandates required to circumvent the five percent clause was increased to three. One way to utilize the direct mandate clause is through the piggyback method.

A party that enters parliament via the basic mandate clause is not necessarily considered a Fraktion in the Bundestag, but only a "group" if it does not win at least 5% of the seats. This entails limited parliamentary procedure. For example, the ability to submit inquiries to the government (small inquiry, large inquiry) is restricted.

In 2024, the abolition of the basic mandate clause was declared unlawful by the Federal Constitutional Court.

===== Case studies =====
In the history of the Federal Republic of Germany, only four parties have been able to send additional members of parliament to the Bundestag via basic mandates. The German Party (DP) and the German Centre Party (Zentrum) benefited from the basic mandate clause of the Bundestag electoral law in the 1950s; after German reunification, the PDS, later The Left Party, also benefited.

In the 1953 West German federal election, the German Party (DP) and the Centre Party entered the Bundestag based on their direct mandates. The DP received 3.3 percent of the vote and won ten constituencies, thus securing 15 seats in the Bundestag. The Centre Party received 0.8 percent of the vote and also entered the Bundestag due to winning one direct mandate.

Following the 1957 West German federal election, the German Party entered the Bundestag with 17 representatives. It had won six direct mandates; the CDU had refrained from nominating direct candidates in some constituencies in favour of the DP (piggyback system).

In the 1994 German federal election, the PDS received 4.4 percent of the vote. Thanks to four directly elected seats in Berlin, it was able to form a parliamentary group in the Bundestag with 30 members. Its successor party, Die Linke, narrowly missed the five percent threshold in the 2021 German federal election with 4.9 percent of the vote, but won three directly elected seats and was therefore represented in the Bundestag with parliamentary group status.

Until 2023, the following applied: If a party won one or two direct mandates and at the same time remained below the five percent threshold, then only these one or two directly elected candidates entered the Bundestag, as was the case with the PDS after the 2002 German federal election. This provision was abolished by the 2023 electoral reform and was not reintroduced even with the transitional arrangement ordered by the Federal Constitutional Court.

===== Criticism =====
The exception to the five percent threshold is not without legal and political controversy. It has been argued that this exception could lead to the paradox of a highly unequal distribution of seats. For example, if a party wins only two percent of the second votes but three or more direct mandates, it will enter the Bundestag; another party that wins four percent of the second votes and a maximum of two direct mandates, however, would fail to do so.

In the 1990s, there was also political debate about increasing the number of directly elected seats required to override the five percent rule to five. This was justified by the larger size of the Federal Republic after reunification in 1990. This view was predominantly held by bourgeois and conservative politicians. They were accused of wanting to make it more difficult for the PDS to return to the Bundestag with this proposal.

===== Literature =====
- Wolfgang Schreiber: Lemma Grundmandatsklausel. in: Sommer & von Westphalen: Staatsbürgerlexikon. Oldenbourg Verlag München Wien 2000, 423
- Dieter Nohlen: Lemmata Personalisierte Verhältniswahl und Sperrklausel in: Lexikon der Politik. 7. Bände. München: Beck Verlag 1992–1998. Digitale Bibliothek 2003
- Dieter Nohlen: Wahlrecht und Parteiensystem: Zur Theorie und Empirie der Wahlsysteme. 6. Auflage Opladen: Leske und Budrich, UTB 2004

==== State elections ====
In some German states, a basic mandate clause also applies to state elections, requiring one or two directly elected seats. This rule was first applied in the 2014 Brandenburg state election, when the BVB/FW party entered the Landtag of Brandenburg with three seats through a single directly elected seat, despite having received only 2.7% of the second votes. In Saxony, the Die Linke secured its return to the Landtag in 2024, despite receiving 4.5% of the second votes, thanks to winning two constituencies.

==== Local elections ====
In local councils, independent council members or smaller factions often only receive a basic mandate on committees because their small size means they are not mathematically entitled to a seat. As holders of this basic mandate, they have the right to speak and submit motions in the respective committee, but they cannot vote (see, for example, Section 71 Paragraph 3 of the Lower Saxony Municipalities Act). In the local councils of North Rhine-Westphalia, these so-called basic mandate holders only have the right to become members of a committee. They can choose the committee themselves, but they do not have voting rights. In the council itself, they may vote, but they cannot submit motions. This relegates them to mere spectators. They cannot fulfill their political mandate of conveying the will of the people to the council through motions due to their lack of the right to submit motions. They cannot comment on motions from other parties, as these are discussed and pre-approved in the specialized committees, and the council itself is only the final decision-making body. Substantive discussion is generally not permitted due to the committee work. So-called lone wolves are thus largely excluded from political information and decision-making.

==== Parties and associations ====
Many parties and associations have very different levels of membership across different regions. To prevent regions with particularly small memberships from being completely unrepresented at a party conference, for example, delegate allocations with basic mandates are used. First, each region is allocated a fixed number of basic mandates (usually one or two). Then, the remaining mandates are distributed according to a specific method (for example, the D’Hondt method) based on membership size.

=== Austria ===
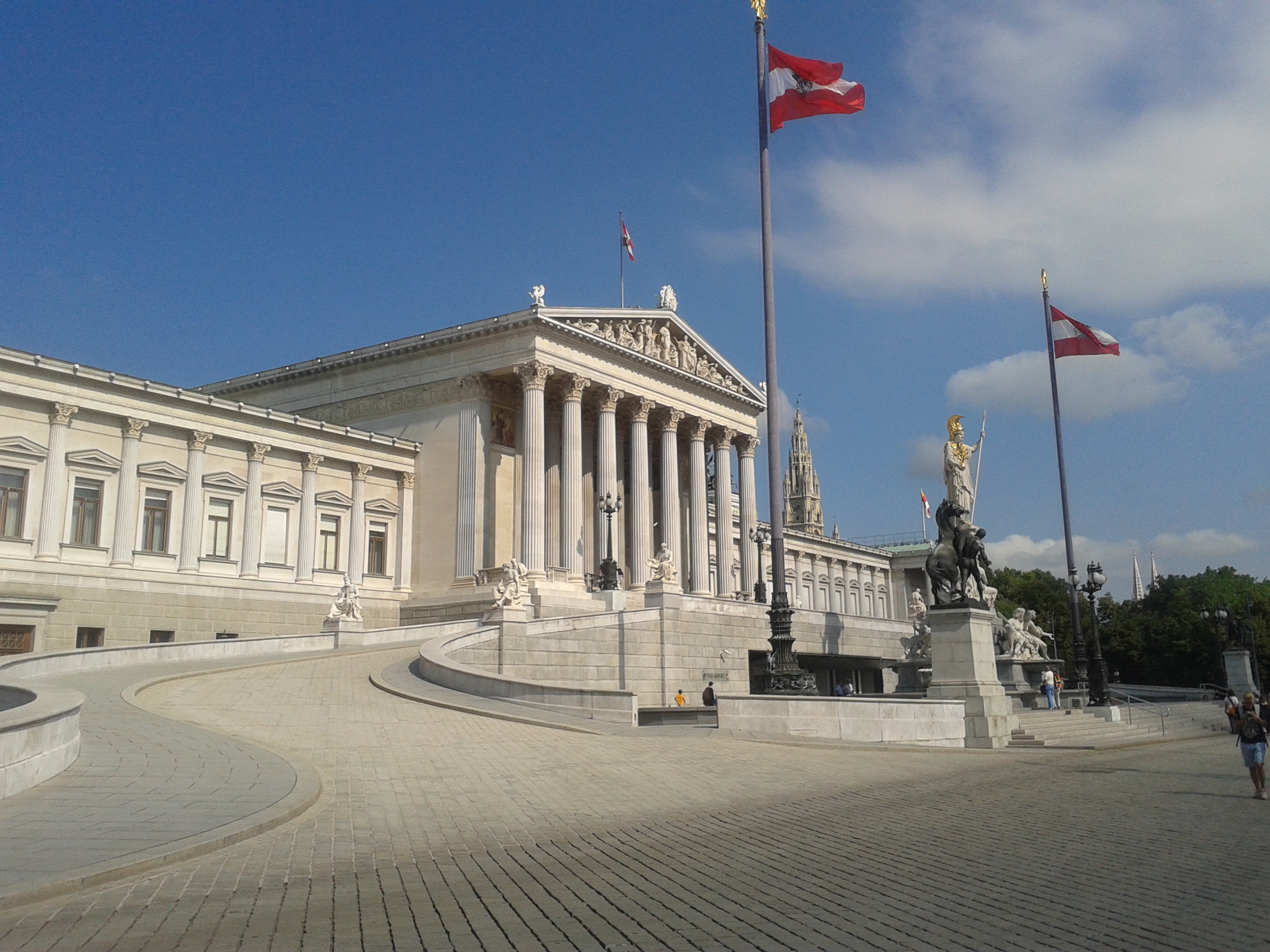
The basic mandate is used in elections to the Austrian Parliament

The allocation of seats in the National Council elections takes place in a three-stage process: the first stage at the regional constituency level, the second at the state constituency level, and the third at the federal level. The "threshold clause" stipulates that parties may only participate in the second (§101(1) NRWO 1992) and third (§107(2) NRWO 1992) stages of seat allocation if they have received at least four percent of the valid votes nationwide. Therefore, securing a seat at the regional constituency level is still possible regardless of the Four percent hurdle. A seat obtained in this way is referred to as a "basic mandate".

If a party wins a direct mandate in the National Council election, it will be considered in the second (state lists) and third (federal lists) allocation rounds, regardless of its nationwide vote total. This eliminates the need to overcome the 4% threshold, which is otherwise required to enter the National Council, making a direct mandate potentially significant.

The electoral quota is calculated by dividing the number of valid votes cast in a federal state by the number of seats to be allocated there (and then rounding up to the next whole number). If a party receives at least as many votes in a regional constituency as the electoral quota for that federal state, a basic seat is awarded in the first allocation procedure. (§96(7) and §97 NRWO 1992)

The allocation of seats in state elections is very similar, although logically there is no third determination process at the federal level, and the number of votes must be calculated for each individual constituency (and not for the federal states). Furthermore, the threshold for representation is 5% instead of 4% in some federal states; in Styria, a party must win a direct mandate to participate in the statewide allocation of seats.

== Examples ==
State of Carinthia | Valid votes: 338,000 | Seats to be filled: 13

The electoral quota is therefore 338,000 / 13 = 26,000. This is how many votes are needed in a constituency in Carinthia to win a basic mandate.
