= Susanne Schaper =

German politician (born 1978)

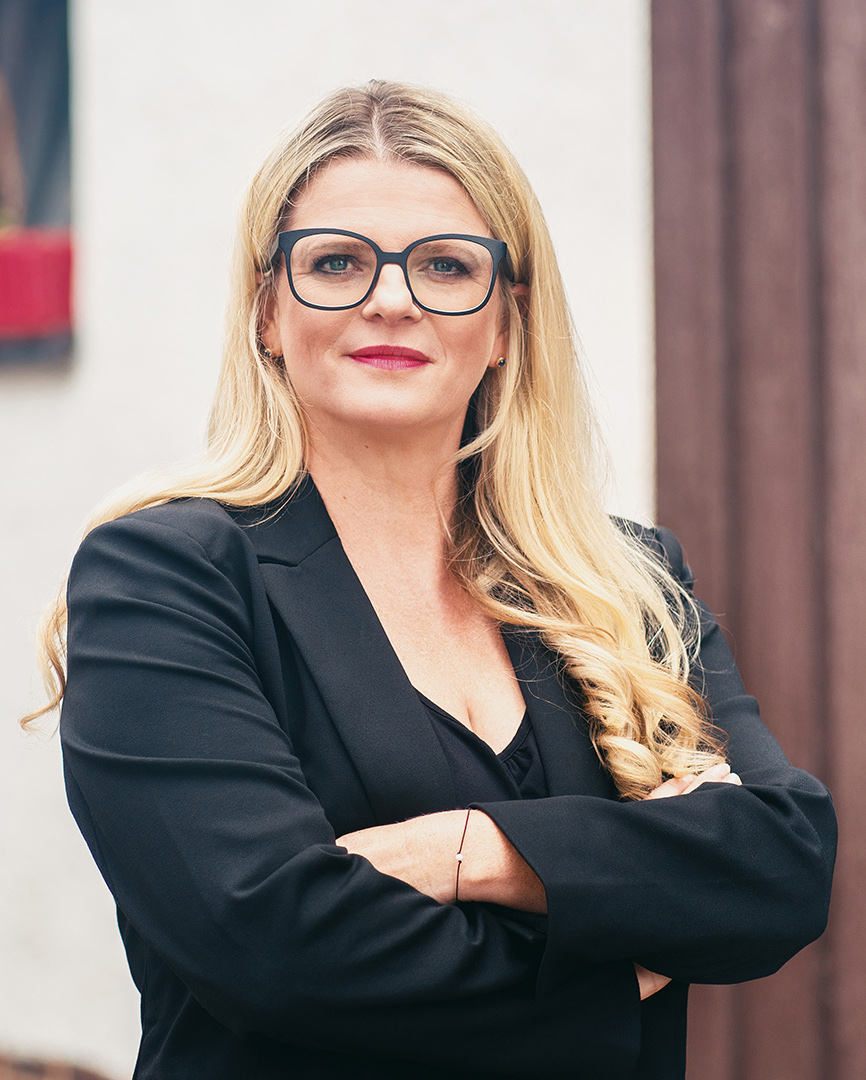
- Susanne Schaper in 2023

Member of the Landtag of Saxony
- Incumbent
- Assumed office 2014

Personal details
- Born: 17 January 1978 (age 48) Chemnitz, Germany
- Party: Die Linke

Susanne Schaper (born 17 January 1978 in Chemnitz) is a German politician from Die Linke. She is an elected member of the Landtag of Saxony.

== Life ==
Schaper's parents were both members of the Socialist Unity Party of Germany (SED), and has faced discrimination because of this fact. From 1994, she completed vocational training as a nurse and is working in her profession. From 2011 to 2018, she studied nursing management alongside her job. As a nurse, she regularly takes part in excursions to Vietnam with the DEVIEMED association, which operates on children with malformations there.

Schaper lives in Chemnitz, is married and has three children.

== Political career ==
In 1994, Susanne Schaper became a member of the Party of Democratic Socialism (PDS) and has since held various offices within Die Linke Saxony and the Chemnitz city association. In 2009, she was elected to the Chemnitz city council for the first time. Since the 2014 local elections, she has been the parliamentary group leader of the Left Party city council group. In the 2014 Saxony state election, she won a mandate via the state list, but with 30.0 percent, no direct mandate. In the 2019 Saxony state election, she received 19.0 percent of the direct votes in her constituency and again received her mandate via the state list.

As a member of the state parliament, Susanne Schaper is chairwoman of the Committee for Social Affairs and Social Cohesion and a member of the Evaluation Committee. She is also the spokesperson for the Left Party in the Saxon state parliament for social and health policy, animal welfare, care, rescue services, family and the labor market. She was also deputy chairwoman of the nursing inquiry and a member of the presidium of the Landtag of Saxony.

In November 2016, Schaper had to leave her office because there had been an increase in probably politically motivated attacks in the previous months, such as stone throwing or swastika graffiti.

Since November 2019, Schaper has been co-chair of the state association of Die Linke Saxony together with Stefan Hartmann.

n February 2020, Susanne Schaper was confirmed as a candidate for the 2020 mayoral election in Chemnitz by a general meeting of the Chemnitz Left Party . Schaper lost the mayoral election to her competitors Sven Schulze (SPD) and Almut Patt (CDU).

Schaper then applied for the position of social mayor and was shortlisted. However, she was unable to prevail against the candidate favoured by the CDU, FDP, AfD and Pro Chemnitz, who was subsequently rejected by the incumbent mayor Sven Schulze. Since November 2021, the office has been filled by Dagmar Ruscheinsky, who won in a second round of voting.

At a state party conference of the Saxon Left in November 2023, Schaper was elected together with Stefan Hartmann as the top duo for the 2024 Saxony state election.
