= Electoral districts of Bremen =

Electoral districts in the state of Bremen

The two Bremen electoral districts are the constituencies for the election of the Bremen Parliament. The Bremen electoral district covers the area of the city of Bremen, while the Bremerhaven electoral district covers the area of the city of Bremerhaven. The Bremen Parliament has 87 representatives. Of these, 72 are elected in the Bremen electoral district and 15 in the Bremerhaven electoral district .

The election is held separately for each of the two electoral districts in a list election based on proportional representation. This results in the nationwide peculiarity that the five percent hurdle is also applied separately for each electoral district. A result above 5% in one of the two electoral districts results in the party in question sending members to the Parliament, even if it falls below 5% at the state level. In the event of a party withdrawing from the Parliament, candidates from the relevant party list in the respective electoral district also take their place.

== Electoral districts and mandates ==
=== State election ===
The Free Hanseatic City of Bremen has been divided into two electoral districts for state elections since 1947. The Bremen electoral district comprises the city of Bremen, while the Bremerhaven electoral district comprises the city of Bremerhaven. The electoral districts are not divided into constituencies. The electoral districts are regulated in Section 5 of the Bremen Electoral Law.

The distribution of seats between the two electoral districts was declared inadmissible by the Bremen State Court Bremen State Court in 2004. Until then, Bremerhaven had received 16 seats. Following the decision, the law was amended in 2006, and the number of representatives from Bremerhaven was reduced to 15.

Since 2007, the Bremen Parliament (state parliament) has comprised 83 members. Of the members of the Bremen Parliament (state parliament), 68 members in the Bremen electoral district (previously 67) and 15 members in the Bremerhaven electoral district (previously 16) are elected in general, direct, free, equal, and secret proportional representation based on list nominations from parties and voters' associations. Nominations are made separately for the cities of Bremen and Bremerhaven.

=== Local elections ===
The city of Bremerhaven will be re-elected for the 48 members of the City Council. The electoral area for the election of the City Council of Bremerhaven is the city of Bremerhaven, with 75 ballot box and 20 postal voting districts.

In the city of Bremen, the 330 council members of the 22 district councils will be newly elected. For council elections in the city of Bremen, the city is divided into 22 council districts. The electoral area is the respective council district. 335 ballot box districts will be established for voting within the city of Bremen, and an additional 82 postal voting districts will be established for postal voting.

In the city of Bremen and the city of Bremerhaven, the electoral districts, polling stations and electoral boards are the same for the combined state and local elections.

== List of electoral districts ==
Electoral districts for the election to the Bremen Parliament, the City Council and the district councils
No.	electoral area	seats	Community	Districts of Bremen / Districts of Bremerhaven
1	Bremen electoral district	72 (state parliament) representatives, or 330 advisory council members in the 22 district advisory councils (local elections)	Bremen	Advisory council area district/city district no. (No information on the 82 postal voting districts) 1 Blockland district (OT 411) 2 Blumenthal district (OT 531–535) 3 district of Borgfeld (OT 351) 4 Burglesum district (OT 511–515) 5 Findorff district (OT 421–424) 6 Gröpelingen district, Industrial Harbours district (OT 441–445, 122) 7 Hemelingen district (OT 381–385) 8 Horn-Lehe district (OT 341–343) 9 Huchting district (OT 241–244) 10 Mitte district (OT 111–113) 11 Neustadt district (OT 211–218) 12 Oberneuland district (OT 361) 13 Obervieland district (OT 231–234) 14 Eastern Suburb District (OT 311–314) 15 Osterholz district (OT 371–375) 16 Schwachhausen district (OT 321–327) 17 Seehausen district (OT 261) 18 Strom district (OT 271) 19 Vahr district (OT 331–335) 20 Vegesack district (OT 521–525) 21 Walle district, Handelshäfen district (OT 431–436, 121) 22 Woltmershausen district, Neustädter Hafen district, Hohentorshafen district (OT 251–252, 124, 125) Since 1991, advisory councils in the Bremen area have been directly elected on the day of the state parliament elections, with the Bremerhaven Overseas Port Area (OT 123) being an advisory council-free area. Unlike state parliament elections, there is no (five percent) threshold for advisory council elections.
2	Bremerhaven electoral district	15 (state parliament) representatives or 48 members of the city council (local elections)	Bremerhaven	1 City District North Ballot Box Voting District Postal Voting District (###.B99) 11 Weddewarden 1110 Weddewarden 111.01 12 Leherheide 1210 Königsheide 121.01 121.02 121.03 121.04 121.B99 1220 Fehrmoor 122.01 122.02 122.B99 1230 Leherheide-West 123.01 123.02 123.03 123.04 123.05 123.B99 13 Lehe 1310 Speckenbüttel 131.01 131.02 131.03 131.B99 1320 Eckernfeld 132.01 132.02 132.03 132.B99 1330 Twischkamp 133.01 133.02 133.03 133.B99 1340 Goethestraße 134.01 134.02 134.03 134.04 134.B99 1350 Klushof 135.01 135.02 135.03 135.04 135.05 135.06 135.B99 1360 Schierholz 136.01 136.02 136.03 136.B99 1370 Buschkämpen 137.01 14 Middle 1410 Center-South 141.01 141.02 141.03 141.B99 1420 Central-North 142.01 142.02 142.03 142.04 142.05 142.B99 2 City District South 21 Geestemünde 2110 Geestemünde-Nord 211.01 211.02 211.03 211.04 211.B99 2120 Geestendorf 212.01 212.02 212.03 212.04 212.05 212.06 212.07 212.B99 2130 Geestemünde-Süd 213.01 213.02 213.B99 2140 Bürgerpark 214.01 214.02 214.03 214.04 214.B99 2150 Grünhöfe 215.01 215.02 215.03 215.B99 22 Schiffdorferdamm 2210 Schiffdorferdamm 221.01 221.02 221.B99 23 Surheide 2310 Surheide 231.01 231.02 231.B99 24 Wulsdorf 2410 Dreibergen 241.01 241.02 241.03 241.B99 2420 Jedutenberg 242.01 242.02 242.03 242.04 242.B99 25 Fishing port 2510 Fishing Port 251.01
