= Basic mandate clause =

Stipulation within a state election system

The Basic mandate clause (German: Grundmandatsklausel) in proportional representation systems linked to direct elections stipulates that a political party will be considered in the allocation of seats according to its share of the vote if it wins a specified minimum number of direct mandates. These required direct mandates are the basic mandates.

== Germany ==
In Germany, four federal states have basic mandate clauses for state elections. These clauses are always linked to a threshold clause. Parties are only considered in the allocation of seats based on their share of the vote if they meet either the threshold clause or the basic mandate clause. Therefore, winning a certain number of basic mandates is an alternative way to overcome the threshold clause.

=== Bundestag ===
For federal elections, the five percent threshold clause is stipulated in the Federal Election Act (BWahlG) in Section 4 Paragraph 2 Sentence 2 No. 2 BWahlG.

In addition, the basic mandate clause applies to parties that fail to meet the threshold: A party that receives a relative majority of first votes in three constituencies will be considered in the distribution of seats according to the ratio of second votes.

On 17 March 2023, the German Bundestag passed an electoral reform law abolishing the basic mandate clause. On 12 May 2023, the Bundesrat waived its right to convene the Mediation Committee with regard to this reform, thereby approving it.

In its decision of 30 July 2024, the Federal Constitutional Court declared the five percent threshold clause without exceptions (following the abolition of the basic mandate clause in the Federal Election Law amended in 2023) unconstitutional and established the incompatibility of this threshold clause with the Basic Law. In the same decision, it ordered the continued application of the threshold clause and issued a regulation corresponding to the former basic mandate clause until the legislature enacts a new regulation for the threshold clause.

The basic mandate clause was applied in the 1953 federal election (in favor of the DP and the Centre Party, where one direct mandate was sufficient), the 1957 federal election (DP), the 1994 federal election (PDS), and the 2021 federal election (Die Linke). In contrast, the PDS only won two direct mandates in the 2002 German federal election, so only those who won these two entered the Bundestag. In the 2021 German federal election, The Left Party entered parliament with enough seats to form a Fraktion due to the basic mandate clause, having fallen below the five percent threshold with 4.9% of the second votes, but winning three direct mandates. This gave Die Linke 39 seats, representing 5.3% of all members of parliament, enough to form a parliamentary group.

The DP also formed parliamentary groups after the elections of 1953 and 1957, as it had reached the then necessary limit of 15 members of parliament in each case.

Parties that entered the Bundestag solely on the basis of the basic mandate clause
Election	Party	Direct mandate	Second vote share	Assigned mandates	Size of the Bundestag
1953	German Party	10	3.3%	15	509
1953	Centre Party	1	0.8%	3	509
1957	German Party	6	3.4%	17	519
1994	Party of Democratic Socialism	4	4.4%	30	672
2021	Die Linke	3	4.9%	39	735

=== Constitutionality ===
The constitutionality of the basic mandate clause is disputed. Some legal scholars consider the basic mandate clause unconstitutional because it violates the principle of equality of suffrage. It prevents parties that have not won at least three direct mandates or have not received at least 5% of the vote from entering parliament. Conversely, a party that has won at least three direct mandates but received significantly fewer votes is successful.

The CSU and Die Linke challenged the abolition of the basic mandate clause. This and other objections to the Federal Election Law in the form of the 2023 reform were the subject of proceedings before the Federal Constitutional Court. In the corresponding joint judgment, the Second Senate of the Federal Constitutional Court reiterated the view that the basic mandate clause was constitutional.

=== State elections ===
In state elections, basic mandate clauses apply in Berlin, Brandenburg, Saxony and Schleswig-Holstein. In Saxony, winning two constituencies is required, while in the other states a single basic mandate is sufficient.

In the 2014 Brandenburg state election, Christoph Schulze won the direct mandate in the Teltow-Fläming III constituency, which he had previously held, with 27% of the vote. This time, however, he was no longer running for the SPD as in the 2009 election, but for the political association Brandenburg United Civic Movements/Free Voters, for which he was also the lead candidate.

Die Linke reached the threshold of two direct mandates in the 2024 Saxony state election and therefore entered the state parliament with six members despite receiving only 4.5% of the party list votes.

Overview of state elections
Federal State	Election	Affected party	Basic mandates		second vote share	Seats
Federal State	Election	Affected party	necessary	reached	second vote share	Seats
Brandenburg	2014	BVB / FW	1	1	2,7 %	3
Saxony	2024	Die Linke	2	2	4,5 %	6

== Austria ==
The allocation of seats in the National Council elections takes place in a three-stage process: the first stage at the regional constituency level, the second at the state constituency level, and the third at the federal level. The "threshold clause" stipulates that parties may only participate in the second (§101(1) NRWO 1992) and third (§107(2) NRWO 1992) stages of seat allocation if they have received at least four percent of the valid votes nationwide. Therefore, securing a seat at the regional constituency level is still possible regardless of the Four percent hurdle. A seat obtained in this way is referred to as a "basic mandate".

Before the 1992 amendment to the NRWO (North Rhine-Westphalia Election Regulations), the basic mandate threshold itself was the decisive barrier clause. In the elections from 1971 to 1990, the lowest level was that of the state constituencies (above which were the constituency associations), which is why basic mandates were significantly easier to obtain. In the first republic and from 1945 to 1970, the lowest level consisted of constituencies that were larger than today's regional constituencies; this also made basic mandates easier to obtain than they are today.

Initially, winning a direct mandate was the sole prerequisite for entering the state parliament in state elections. It was only in the Second Republic that percentage-based thresholds (4% or 5%, depending on the state) were gradually introduced, exceeding which allows entry even without a direct mandate. Only in Styria is a direct mandate still a necessary condition for entering the Landtag of Styria.

== Application in non-German-speaking areas ==
Similar rules regarding the basic mandate clause exist in New Zealand with a minimum of one direct mandate and in South Korea with a minimum of five direct mandates.

== See also ==
- Wolfgang Schreiber: Artikel Grundmandatsklausel. in: Sommer & von Westphalen: Staatsbürgerlexikon. Oldenbourg Verlag München Wien 2000, S. 423
