= Mandate (aftershave) =

British aftershave brand

Mandate is a British aftershave brand.

In the 1970s, there were television commercials for Mandate featuring the French pop singer Sacha Distel.
