= Marco Böhme =

German politician (born 1990)

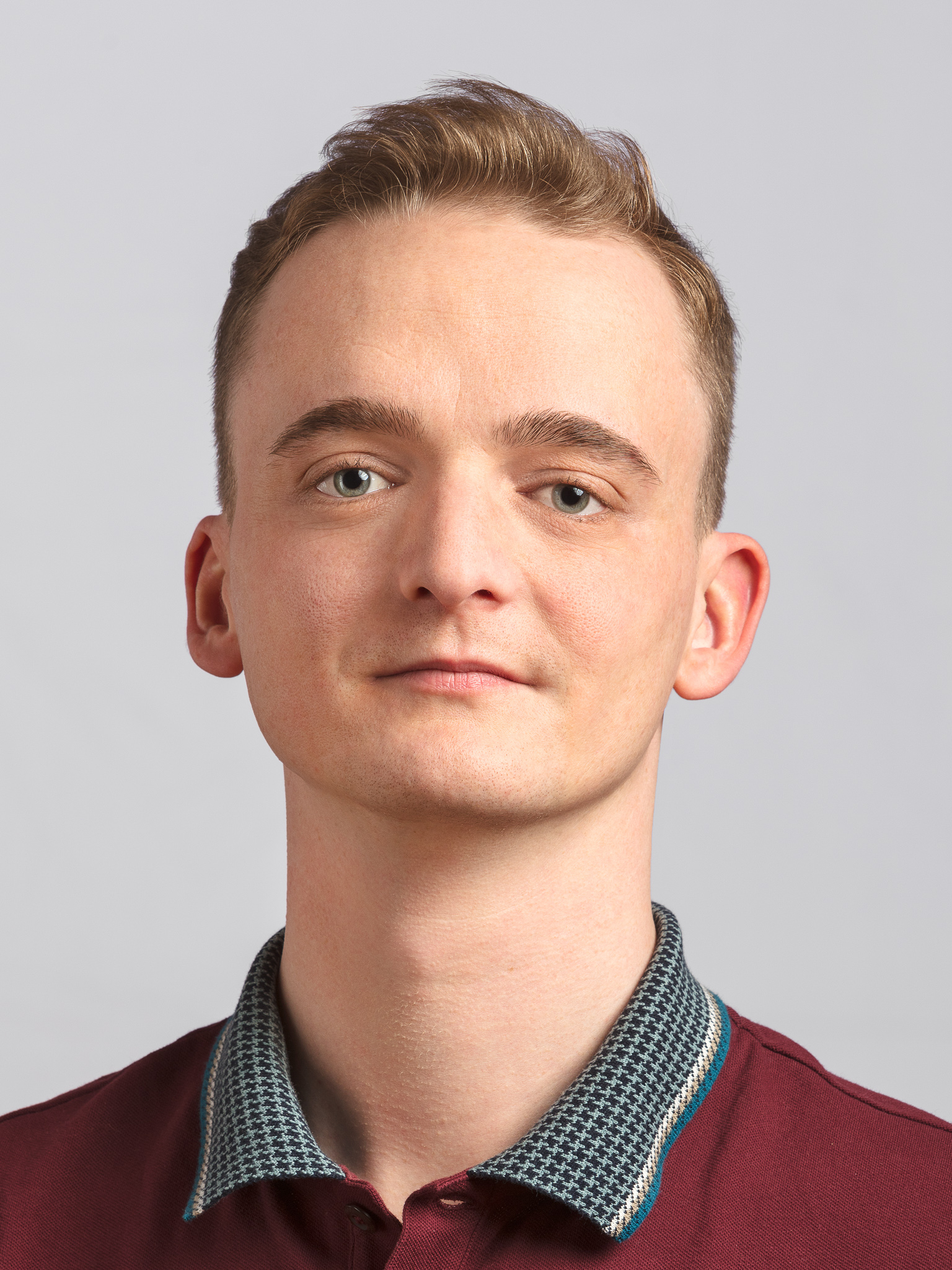
- Böhme in 2019

Member of the Landtag of Saxony
- In office 29 September 2014 – 1 October 2024

Personal details
- Born: 12 April 1990 (age 36) Leipzig
- Party: Die Linke (since 2008)

Marco Böhme (born 12 April 1990) is a German politician serving as co-chairman of Die Linke in Saxony since 2025. From 2014 to 2024, he was a member of the Landtag of Saxony.
