= East Tyrol (National Council electoral district) =

Parliamentary electoral district in Austria

- Osttirol
- Electoral District for the National Council
- Location of East Tyrol within Austria
- District: Lienz
- State: Tyrol
- Population: 48,841 (2024)
- Electorate: 39,536 (2019)
- Area: 2,020 km^{2} (2023)

Current Electoral District
- Created: 1994
- Seats: 1 (1994–present)

East Tyrol (German: Osttirol), also known as Electoral District 7E (German: Wahlkreis 7E), is one of the 39 multi-member regional electoral districts of the National Council, the lower house of the Austrian Parliament, the national legislature of Austria. The electoral district was created in 1992 when electoral regulations were amended to add regional electoral districts to the existing state-wide electoral districts and came into being at the following legislative election in 1994. It is conterminous with the district of Lienz in the state of Tyrol. The electoral district currently elects one of the 183 members of the National Council using the open party-list proportional representation electoral system. At the 2019 legislative election the constituency had 39,536 registered electors.

== History ==
East Tyrol was one 43 regional electoral districts (regionalwahlkreise) established by the "National Council Electoral Regulations 1992" (Nationalrats-Wahlordnung 1992) passed by the National Council in 1992. It was conterminous with the district of Lienz in the state of Tyrol. The district was initially allocated one seat in May 1993.

== Electoral system ==
East Tyrol currently elects one of the 183 members of the National Council using the open party-list proportional representation electoral system. The allocation of seats is carried out in three stages. In the first stage, seats are allocated to parties (lists) at the regional level using a state-wide Hare quota (wahlzahl) (valid votes in the state divided by the number of seats in the state). In the second stage, seats are allocated to parties at the state/provincial level using the state-wide Hare quota (any seats won by the party at the regional stage are subtracted from the party's state seats). In the third and final stage, seats are allocated to parties at the federal/national level using the D'Hondt method (any seats won by the party at the regional and state stages are subtracted from the party's federal seats). Only parties that reach the 4% national threshold, or have won a seat at the regional stage, compete for seats at the state and federal stages.

Electors may cast one preferential vote for individual candidates at the regional, state and federal levels. Split-ticket voting (panachage), or voting for more than one candidate at each level, is not permitted and will result in the ballot paper being invalidated. At the regional level, candidates must receive preferential votes amounting to at least 14% of the valid votes cast for their party to over-ride the order of the party list (10% and 7% respectively for the state and federal levels). Prior to April 2013 electors could not cast preferential votes at the federal level and the thresholds candidates needed to over-ride the party list order were higher at the regional level (half the Hare quota or 1/6 of the party votes) and state level (Hare quota).

== Election results ==
=== Summary ===
Election	Communists KPÖ+ / KPÖ			Social Democrats SPÖ			Greens GRÜNE			NEOS NEOS / LiF			People's ÖVP			Freedom FPÖ		
Election	Votes	%	Seats	Votes	%	Seats	Votes	%	Seats	Votes	%	Seats	Votes	%	Seats	Votes	%	Seats
2019	105	0.38%	0	2,505	8.99%	0	3,129	11.23%	0	2,177	7.81%	0	15,337	55.02%	0	4,109	14.74%	0
2017	110	0.37%	0	4,900	16.67%	0	953	3.24%	0	1,504	5.12%	0	13,527	46.02%	0	7,108	24.18%	0
2013	140	0.54%	0	4,193	16.15%	0	2,753	10.60%	0	1,060	4.08%	0	10,364	39.92%	0	4,846	18.66%	0
2008	125	0.45%	0	3,804	13.82%	0	2,470	8.97%	0	335	1.22%	0	10,828	39.34%	0	3,705	13.46%	0
2006	179	0.64%	0	4,600	16.55%	0	3,105	11.17%	0				15,072	54.22%	0	2,757	9.92%	0
2002	103	0.33%	0	4,783	15.51%	0	2,612	8.47%	0	271	0.88%	0	19,826	64.28%	0	3,247	10.53%	0
1999	48	0.16%	0	4,479	15.37%	0	2,434	8.35%	0	737	2.53%	0	13,840	47.50%	0	7,083	24.31%	0
1995	49	0.16%	0	6,105	19.99%	0	1,908	6.25%	0	1,256	4.11%	0	13,897	45.50%	0	6,933	22.70%	0
1994	36	0.12%	0	4,913	16.83%	0	2,436	8.34%	0	1,146	3.93%	0	15,133	51.84%	0	5,004	17.14%	0

=== Detailed ===
==== 2010s ====
===== 2019 =====
Results of the 2019 legislative election held on 29 September 2019:

Party		Votes	%	Seats
Austrian People's Party	ÖVP	15,337	55.02%	0
The Greens – The Green Alternative	GRÜNE	3,129	11.23%	0
Freedom Party of Austria	FPÖ	4,109	14.74%	0
Social Democratic Party of Austria	SPÖ	2,505	8.99%	0
NEOS – The New Austria and Liberal Forum	NEOS	2,177	7.81%	0
JETZT	JETZT	376	1.35%	0
KPÖ Plus	KPÖ+	105	0.38%	0
Der Wandel	WANDL	86	0.31%	0
My Vote Counts!	GILT	49	0.18%	0
Valid Votes		27,873	100.00%	0
Rejected Votes		287	1.02%	
Total Polled		28,160	71.23%	
Registered Electors		39,536		

===== 2017 =====
Results of the 2017 legislative election held on 15 October 2017:

Party		Votes	%	Seats
Austrian People's Party	ÖVP	13,527	46.02%	0
Freedom Party of Austria	FPÖ	7,108	24.18%	0
Social Democratic Party of Austria	SPÖ	4,900	16.67%	0
NEOS – The New Austria and Liberal Forum	NEOS	1,504	5.12%	0
Peter Pilz List	PILZ	973	3.31%	0
The Greens – The Green Alternative	GRÜNE	953	3.24%	0
My Vote Counts!	GILT	218	0.74%	0
Communist Party of Austria	KPÖ	110	0.37%	0
The Whites	WEIßE	65	0.22%	0
Free List Austria	FLÖ	37	0.13%	0
Valid Votes		29,395	100.00%	0
Rejected Votes		345	1.16%	
Total Polled		29,740	74.89%	
Registered Electors		39,710		

===== 2013 =====
Results of the 2013 legislative election held on 29 September 2013:

Party		Votes	%	Seats
Austrian People's Party	ÖVP	10,364	39.92%	0
Freedom Party of Austria	FPÖ	4,846	18.66%	0
Social Democratic Party of Austria	SPÖ	4,193	16.15%	0
The Greens – The Green Alternative	GRÜNE	2,753	10.60%	0
Team Stronach	FRANK	1,411	5.43%	0
NEOS – The New Austria	NEOS	1,060	4.08%	0
Alliance for the Future of Austria	BZÖ	1,031	3.97%	0
Pirate Party of Austria	PIRAT	166	0.64%	0
Communist Party of Austria	KPÖ	140	0.54%	0
Valid Votes		25,964	100.00%	0
Rejected Votes		574	2.16%	
Total Polled		26,538	66.14%	
Registered Electors		40,121		

==== 2000s ====
===== 2008 =====
Results of the 2008 legislative election held on 28 September 2008:

Party		Votes	%	Seats
Austrian People's Party	ÖVP	10,828	39.34%	0
Social Democratic Party of Austria	SPÖ	3,804	13.82%	0
Freedom Party of Austria	FPÖ	3,705	13.46%	0
Alliance for the Future of Austria	BZÖ	3,682	13.38%	0
The Greens – The Green Alternative	GRÜNE	2,470	8.97%	0
Fritz Dinkhauser List – Citizens' Forum Tyrol	FRITZ	2,015	7.32%	0
The Christians	DC	374	1.36%	0
Liberal Forum	LiF	335	1.22%	0
Independent Citizens' Initiative Save Austria	RETTÖ	172	0.62%	0
Communist Party of Austria	KPÖ	125	0.45%	0
Left	LINKE	11	0.04%	0
Valid Votes		27,521	100.00%	0
Rejected Votes		560	1.99%	
Total Polled		28,081	70.04%	
Registered Electors		40,094		

===== 2006 =====
Results of the 2006 legislative election held on 1 October 2006:

Party		Votes	%	Seats
Austrian People's Party	ÖVP	15,072	54.22%	0
Social Democratic Party of Austria	SPÖ	4,600	16.55%	0
The Greens – The Green Alternative	GRÜNE	3,105	11.17%	0
Freedom Party of Austria	FPÖ	2,757	9.92%	0
Alliance for the Future of Austria	BZÖ	1,027	3.69%	0
Hans-Peter Martin's List	MATIN	895	3.22%	0
Communist Party of Austria	KPÖ	179	0.64%	0
EU Withdrawal – Neutral Free Austria	NFÖ	162	0.58%	0
Valid Votes		27,797	100.00%	0
Rejected Votes		545	1.92%	
Total Polled		28,342	73.29%	
Registered Electors		38,673		

===== 2002 =====
Results of the 2002 legislative election held on 24 November 2002:

Party		Votes	%	Seats
Austrian People's Party	ÖVP	19,826	64.28%	0
Social Democratic Party of Austria	SPÖ	4,783	15.51%	0
Freedom Party of Austria	FPÖ	3,247	10.53%	0
The Greens – The Green Alternative	GRÜNE	2,612	8.47%	0
Liberal Forum	LiF	271	0.88%	0
Communist Party of Austria	KPÖ	103	0.33%	0
Valid Votes		30,842	100.00%	0
Rejected Votes		540	1.72%	
Total Polled		31,382	83.65%	
Registered Electors		37,518		

==== 1990s ====
===== 1999 =====
Results of the 1999 legislative election held on 3 October 1999:

Party		Votes	%	Seats
Austrian People's Party	ÖVP	13,840	47.50%	0
Freedom Party of Austria	FPÖ	7,083	24.31%	0
Social Democratic Party of Austria	SPÖ	4,479	15.37%	0
The Greens – The Green Alternative	GRÜNE	2,434	8.35%	0
Liberal Forum	LiF	737	2.53%	0
The Independents	DU	240	0.82%	0
Christian Voters Community	CWG	160	0.55%	0
No to NATO and EU – Neutral Austria Citizens' Initiative	NEIN	117	0.40%	0
Communist Party of Austria	KPÖ	48	0.16%	0
Valid Votes		29,138	100.00%	0
Rejected Votes		590	1.98%	
Total Polled		29,728	79.40%	
Registered Electors		37,441		

===== 1995 =====
Results of the 1995 legislative election held on 17 December 1995:

Party		Votes	%	Seats
Austrian People's Party	ÖVP	13,897	45.50%	0
Freedom Party of Austria	FPÖ	6,933	22.70%	0
Social Democratic Party of Austria	SPÖ	6,105	19.99%	0
The Greens – The Green Alternative	GRÜNE	1,908	6.25%	0
Liberal Forum	LiF	1,256	4.11%	0
No – Civic Action Group; Against the Sale of Austria	NEIN	396	1.30%	0
Communist Party of Austria	KPÖ	49	0.16%	0
Valid Votes		30,544	100.00%	0
Rejected Votes		999	3.17%	
Total Polled		31,543	85.87%	
Registered Electors		36,735		

===== 1994 =====
Results of the 1994 legislative election held on 9 October 1994:

Party		Votes	%	Seats
Austrian People's Party	ÖVP	15,133	51.84%	0
Freedom Party of Austria	FPÖ	5,004	17.14%	0
Social Democratic Party of Austria	SPÖ	4,913	16.83%	0
The Greens – The Green Alternative	GRÜNE	2,436	8.34%	0
Liberal Forum	LiF	1,146	3.93%	0
Christian Voters Community	CWG	231	0.79%	0
No – Civic Action Group; Against the Sale of Austria	NEIN	219	0.75%	0
Natural Law Party	ÖNP	46	0.16%	0
Communist Party of Austria	KPÖ	36	0.12%	0
United Greens Austria – List Adi Pinter	VGÖ	29	0.10%	0
Valid Votes		29,193	100.00%	0
Rejected Votes		835	2.78%	
Total Polled		30,028	81.88%	
Registered Electors		36,675		
