= André Hahn (politician) =

German politician

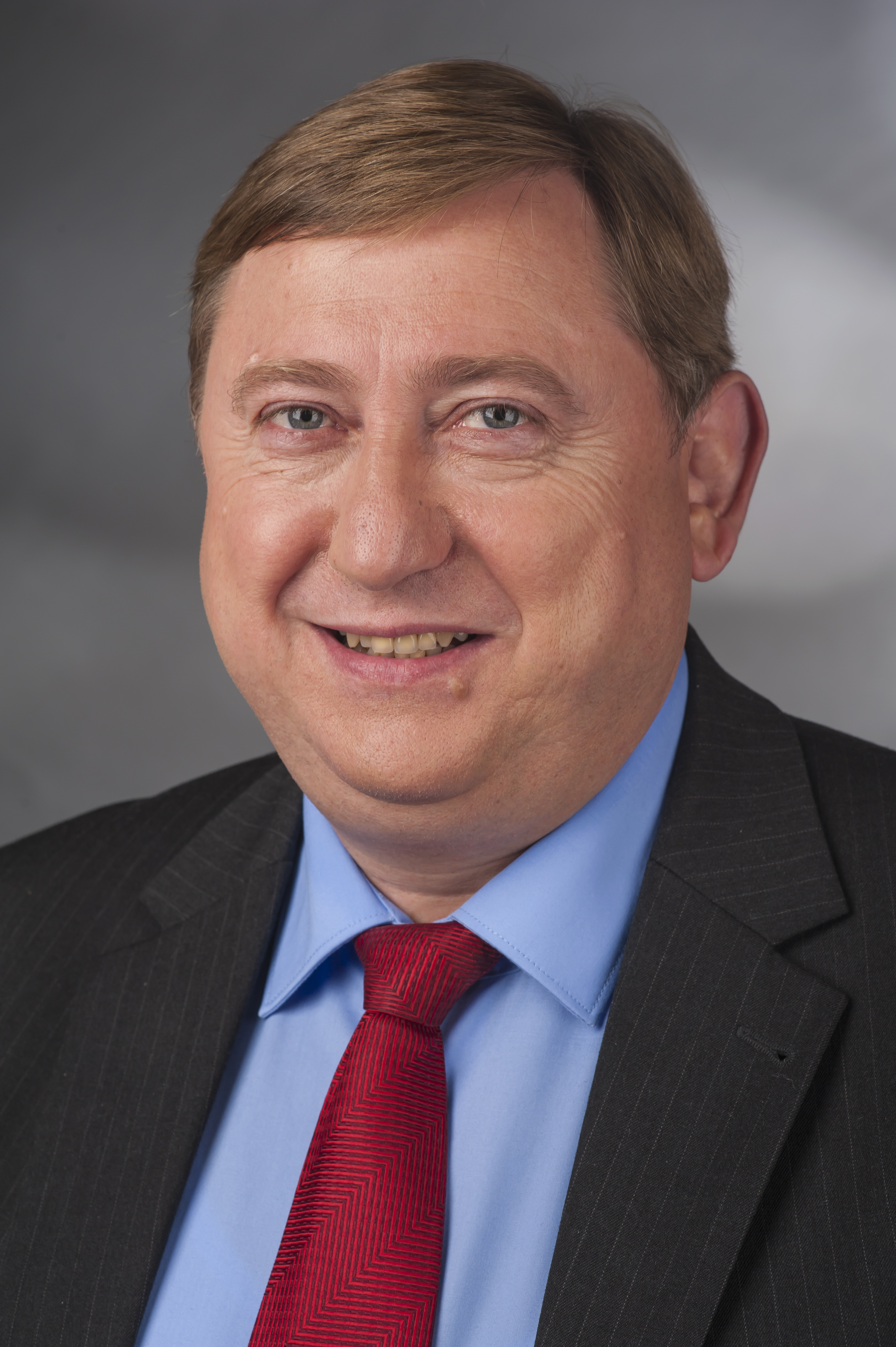
- Hahn in 2014

Member of the Bundestag
- Incumbent
- Assumed office 2017

Personal details
- Born: 20 April 1963 (age 62) Berlin-Friedrichshain, East Germany (now Germany)
- Party: The Left
- Other political affiliations: Party of Democratic Socialism (1990–2007); Socialist Unity Party (1985–1990)
- Children: 1

André Hahn (born 20 April 1963) is a German politician. Born in Berlin-Friedrichshain, he represents The Left. André Hahn has served as a member of the Bundestag from the state of Saxony since 2013.

== Life ==
After completing the tenth grade, Hahn completed a vocational training course with an A-levels as a typesetter and then studied as a teacher of German and history at the Humboldt University in Berlin from 1984 to 1989. This was followed by research studies in political science. During this time, he was a research assistant to the LL/PDS faction in the Saxon state parliament from 1991 to 1994. In 1994, he received his doctorate on political culture in the last year of the GDR. From December 1994 to November 2013 he was a member of the Saxon State Parliament. He became member of the bundestag after the 2013 German federal election. He is a member of the interior committee and the sports committee. He is the spokesman for sports policy for his parliamentary group. He is a member of the Parliamentary Oversight Panel and Committee for the Scrutiny of Acoustic Surveillance of the Private Home. He is deputy chairman of his group.
