= Member =

Member may refer to:

- A person who belongs to a group of any kind: organization, society, club, social class, etc.
- Element (mathematics), an object that belongs to a mathematical set
- In object-oriented programming, a member of a class
  - Field (computer science), entries in a database
  - Member variable, a variable that is associated with a specific object
- Limb (anatomy), an appendage of the human or animal body
  - Euphemism for penis
- Structural component of a truss, connected by nodes
- User (computing), a person making use of a computing service, especially on the Internet
- Member (geology), a component of a geological formation
- The Members, a British punk rock band
- Meronymy, a semantic relationship in linguistics
