= Five percent hurdle =

Function of the German electoral system

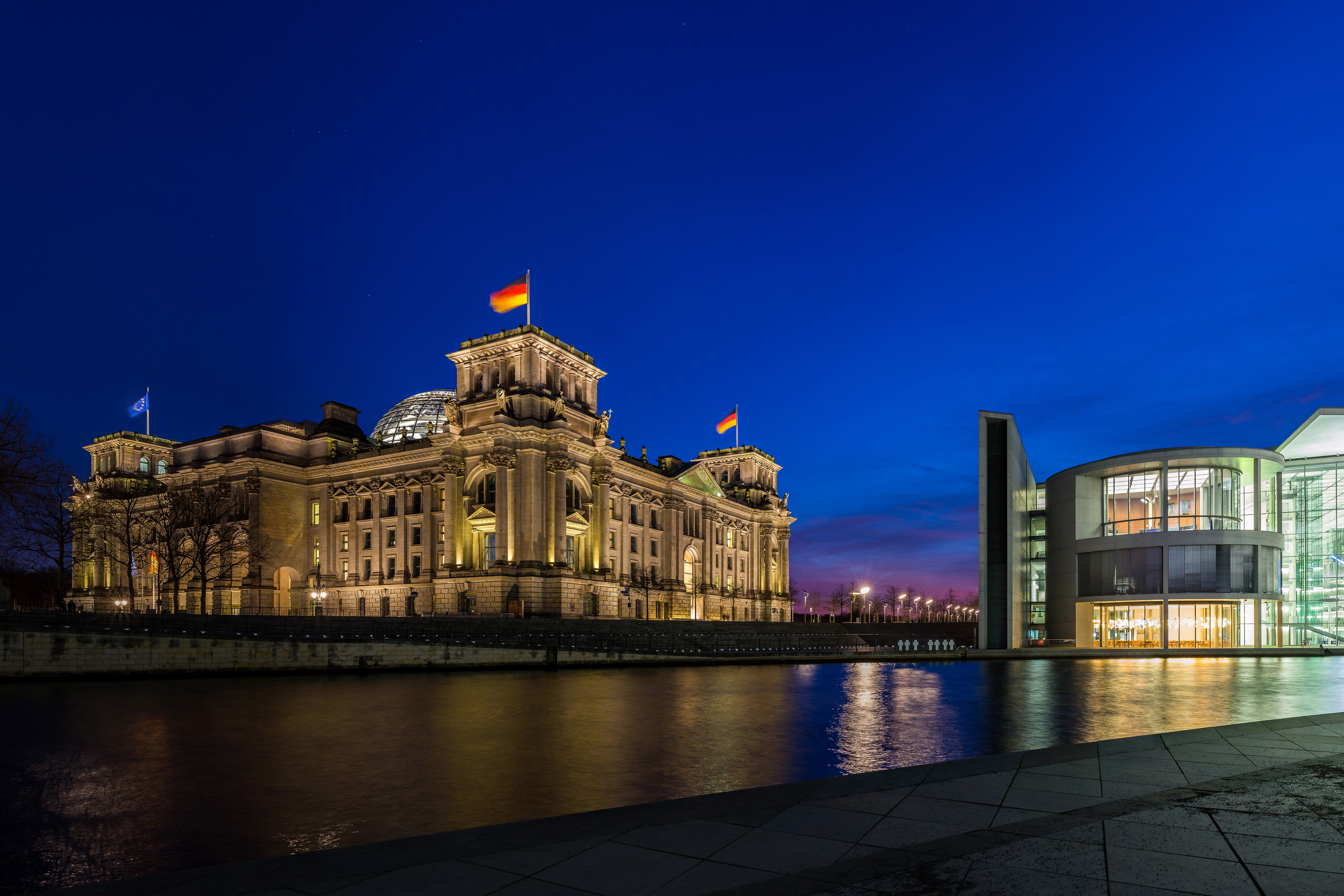
Political parties need to achieve 5% of the second vote in order to secure representation in the Bundestag.

The five percent hurdle (German: Fünf Prozent Hürde), also called the five percent clause, is the best known and most widely used electoral threshold for elections in Germany. Similar regulations exist in other countries with proportional representation.

== Background ==
For the first Bundestag in 1949, the five percent hurdle applied separately to each federal state. On 25 June 1953, the German Bundestag passed a new federal election law, according to which it refers to the valid votes cast nationwide. In the 1990 German federal election, the five percent hurdle applied separately to West and East Germany as an exception due to the special situation immediately after German reunification.

== National minorities ==
Some parties of national minorities are exempt from the five percent hurdle. For example, the South Schleswig Voters' Association (SSW) in Schleswig-Holstein, which represents the Danish national minority resident there, is exempt from it. In contrast to the Schleswig-Holstein electoral law, which according to Section 3 Paragraph 1 Sentence 2 expressly exempts only parties of the Danish minority from the threshold clause (based on the Bonn-Copenhagen Declarations). According to Section 4 Paragraph 2 Sentence 3 BWahlG, the exemption from the five percent hurdle extends to all parties of national minorities in Germany. In addition to the SSW, the Lusatian Alliance, founded in 2005, currently exists as a Sorbian party in Brandenburg and Saxony, although it has not yet taken part in any elections. The Frisians party, founded in Lower Saxony in 2007, which described itself in its statutes as a party of a national minority, dissolved again in 2023.

== Legal basis ==
=== Federal elections ===
The following applies to the election to the German Bundestag: In order for a party to be allocated seats according to the distribution of votes, it must receive at least five percent of the valid second votes ("five percent clause"). Otherwise, the second votes cast for this party are forfeited.

The basic mandate clause, according to which parties that win at least three direct mandates also enter the Bundestag in accordance with their second votes, was originally abolished in 2023. In its decision of 30 July 2024, the Federal Constitutional Court declared the design of the five percent threshold without exceptions in Section 4 Paragraph 2 Sentence 2 Number 2 BWahlG (after the abolition of the basic mandate clause in the Federal Election Act amended in 2023) to be unconstitutional and found that this threshold was incompatible with the Basic Law. In order to ensure the work and functionality of the Bundestag, it is not necessary to disregard a party in the allocation of seats whose members would, if they were taken into account, form a joint parliamentary group with the members of another party if both parties together exceeded the five percent hurdle. The Federal Constitutional Court ordered the continued validity of the barrier clause and issued a regulation corresponding to the previous basic mandate clause until the barrier clause is revised by the legislature.

Furthermore, any direct mandates won remain only for individual candidates (Section 6 Paragraph 2 BWahlG), not for candidates of a party if the latter fails to meet the threshold (Section 6 Paragraph 1 BWahlG).

Parties of national minorities, such as the SSW, which took part in a federal election in 2021 for the first time since 1961 and was therefore represented in the Bundestag with one member (Stefan Seidler), are exempt from the threshold. Only native minorities such as Danes, Frisians, Sinti and Sorbs are considered national minorities, but not immigrants such as Italians or Turks.

=== European elections ===
Since the 2014 European elections, there is no longer a threshold clause.

Until the 2009 election, a pure five percent hurdle applied in European elections according to Section 2 Paragraph 7 of the European Elections Act (electoral system, allocation of seats) in the version of 17 March 2008.

However, according to the decision of the Federal Constitutional Court of 9 November 2011, the provision is not compatible with the Basic Law and is therefore void. In the court's view, it violates the right to vote and equal opportunities for the parties.

At the end of 2012, the CDU federal party conference and some SPD state associations then called for the introduction of a three percent hurdle in European elections; the CSU preferred the establishment of constituencies and the switch to the D'Hondt method, which would also lead to a significant increase in the de facto threshold. The European Parliament also passed a resolution in November 2012, calling on member states to introduce "suitable and appropriate minimum thresholds" for the allocation of seats.

On 13 June 2013, the German Bundestag passed a three percent threshold for the European Parliament elections. Several smaller parties appealed against this before the Federal Constitutional Court, and the cross-party association Mehr Demokratie also organised a lawsuit against the law.

The Federal Constitutional Court held oral hearings on the complaints on 18 December 2013. The court discussed whether the political situation in the European Parliament had changed so much since 2011 that a threshold clause could now be justified.

On 26 February 2014, the Federal Constitutional Court ruled that the three percent hurdle was unconstitutional and void because it violated the principle of equal opportunities for parties. In the 2014 European elections, seven members of small parties entered the European Parliament, most of whom joined one of the large groups.

On 6 June 2018, on the initiative of the CDU, CSU and SPD, the EU states in the Council of the European Union agreed, as part of a whole package of electoral law changes, to introduce a threshold of at least 2% in large countries/EP constituencies, which is to be implemented by the next European election after the decision comes into force at the latest. The new regulation was designed in such a way that it effectively only affects small parties in Germany and, to a limited extent, in Spain (all other EU states already have a higher explicit or de facto threshold in the European elections). Before it comes into force, the electoral law change must still be ratified by all EU member states and then incorporated into national electoral law. The grand coalition abandoned plans to ratify and reintroduce a threshold for the 2019 European elections following resistance from the Greens in November 2018. In another legislative initiative in 2023 following a change in European electoral laws, the Bundesrat and Bundestag voted for a threshold clause, but the signature of Federal President Frank-Walter Steinmeier was still missing. In July 2023, Die PARTEI applied to the Federal Constitutional Court to stop this German consent law, which provides for the introduction of a threshold clause of at least two and at most five percent of the valid votes cast in the elections to the European Parliament. This application and a corresponding constitutional complaint by party leader Martin Sonneborn were rejected as inadmissible by decision of 6 February 2024 (2 BvE 6/23, 2 BvR 994/23). This decision has no effect on the 2024 European elections, but a corresponding hurdle of at least 2% will come for the 2029 election.

=== State elections ===
For state elections, the five percent hurdle is anchored in the respective state election laws. In most states, the five percent hurdle refers to the valid votes. In most states, direct candidates elected via the first vote also enter the state parliament if their party was unable to overcome the threshold; in some cases there is also a basic mandate clause similar to that in the federal election.

==== Bavaria ====
On 1 July 1973, the five percent threshold for state elections was introduced in Bavaria by referendum. Previously, a ten percent threshold applied at the district level, i.e. a party had to achieve ten percent of the valid votes in at least one of the districts in order to enter the state parliament.

Only in Bavaria does the rule still apply that only direct candidates of parties that receive at least five percent of the valid votes, with first and second votes being added together, can enter the state parliament.

==== Berlin ====
In Berlin, the five percent hurdle has constitutional status. Here, the hurdle refers to the votes cast, so it is effectively somewhat higher.

==== Bremen ====
In the state of Bremen, the five percent hurdle is applied separately in the two electoral districts of Bremen and Bremerhaven. This meant that in the 2003 state election, the DVU and FDP and in 2007, the DVU and the Citizens in Rage were able to enter the state parliament in Bremerhaven, although they did not achieve five percent of the vote nationwide.

==== Schleswig-Holstein ====
In Schleswig-Holstein, the South Schleswig Voters’ Association (SSW) is exempt from the five percent hurdle.

=== Local elections ===
In almost all federal states, the five percent hurdle is no longer applied in local elections; all parties and groups that receive enough votes to overcome the de facto threshold - depending on the seat allocation procedure - can enter the district, city and municipal councils. With the usual size of district, city and municipal councils of around 20 to 70 people, this lower limit is then between 2.5 and 0.7 percent.

==== Berlin ====
In Berlin, there is a three percent hurdle in elections to the District Council.

==== Bremen ====
In the city of Bremen, the five percent hurdle only applies to the elections of the Bremen city council.

==== Hamburg ====
In Hamburg, there is a three percent hurdle in the District Assembly elections.

==== Hesse ====
In the coalition agreement between the CDU and SPD for the 2024-2029 electoral period, the parties advocate evaluating the introduction of a threshold clause in particular to ensure local governments' ability to act. The association Mehr Demokratie and small parties such as Volt und Die PARTEI criticized the move as undemocratic.

==== North Rhine-Westphalia ====
In North Rhine-Westphalia, the five percent threshold was abolished by a ruling of the Constitutional Court of North Rhine-Westphalia on 6 July 1999.

A "one-seat clause" subsequently introduced, according to which a party must have achieved at least 1.0 seats in order to enter the representative body, was inadmissible by judgment of 16 December 2008.

On 21 November 2017, the Constitutional Court of North Rhine-Westphalia declared the 2.5 percent hurdle passed by the SPD, CDU and Greens in the state parliament in 2016 to be unconstitutional. However, it is valid for the election of district councils. There was no 2.5 percent hurdle in the 2020 North Rhine-Westphalia local elections.

==== Schleswig-Holstein ====
On 13 February 2008, the Federal Constitutional Court upheld a lawsuit filed by the Schleswig-Holstein Greens and Left Party and declared the five percent hurdle in local elections unconstitutional because it violated the equal opportunities of smaller parties. After the introduction of direct elections of mayors and district administrators in Schleswig-Holstein in 1995, stable majorities were no longer required for these elections. In addition, experience in other federal states without this hurdle showed that the municipalities were still functional.

==== Thuringia ====
On 11 April 2008, the five percent hurdle was also declared illegal in Thuringia.

== Forfeited second votes (federal election) ==
The following table lists the second votes cast in federal elections but lost due to the five percent hurdle, the nationwide threshold in Germany since 1953. Votes deemed invalid are not included in the table.

Forfeited second votes in previous federal elections
	Valid second votes ^{1}	Of these expired	Share expired
1953	27,551,272	1,803,026	6.54 %
1957	29,905,428	2,087,041	6.98 %
1961	31,550,901	1,796,408	5.69 %
1965	32,620,442	1,186,449	3.64 %
1969	32,966,024	1,801,699	5.47 %
1972	37,459,750	348,579	0.93 %
1976	37,822,500	333,595	0.88 %
1980	37,938,981	749,646	1.98 %
1983	38,940,687	201,962	0.52 %
1987	37,867,319	512,817	1.35 %
1990	46,455,772	3,740,292	8.05%
1994	47,105,174	1,698,766	3.61 %
1998	49,308,512	2,899,822	5.88 %
2002	47,996,480	3,376,001	7.03%
2005	47,287,988	1,857,610	3.93 %
2009	43,371,190	2,606,902	6.01 %
2013	43,726,856	6,859,439	15.69 %
2017	46,515,492	2,325,533	5.00 %
2021	46,419,448	4,003,553	8.62 %
2025	49,649,512	6,816,156	13.73 %

== Controversies ==
The aim of this threshold is to concentrate the distribution of seats in order to promote stable majorities and to counteract the political fragmentation of the parliaments by small and very small parties and the associated internal conflicts. It was introduced after the experiences of the Weimar Republic. The five percent hurdle is considered controversial. Critics believe that it contradicts the idea of democracy and the Basic Law (Article 38, Paragraph 1 of the Basic Law), according to which every vote must have the same value. With a threshold, the number of votes cast is still equal, but not necessarily the same success rate (see also overhang mandates). When small parties fail to clear the five percent hurdle, it often happens that a government coalition receives an absolute majority of parliamentary seats with less than 50% of the vote. According to Dieter Nohlen, such disproportionate effects depend on whether an electorate anticipates the effect of such threshold clauses and refrains from voting for such parties, and called this a psychological effect. The functionality of popular representations, where parties with only one seat are allowed, is demonstrated by the European Parliament with 206 parties and the Swiss Federal Assembly with 12 parties, where political fragmentation is reduced by factions.

=== Case law ===
In 1990, the Federal Constitutional Court declared the five percent threshold at federal level to be constitutional in principle, as it considered a functioning parliament to be a higher good than the exact reflection of the political will of the voters. However, it stressed that "the compatibility of a threshold with the principle of equal elections cannot be assessed once and for all in the abstract"; the current circumstances must therefore be taken into account. In local elections, however, some constitutional courts in the states have declared the five percent hurdle to be inadmissible or subject to review. Shortly after the founding of the Federal Republic of Germany, the Federal Constitutional Court declared a threshold of 7.5% in Schleswig-Holstein to be unconstitutional.

=== Controversy after the 2013 federal election ===
In the 2013 German federal election, 6.8 million (15.7 percent) votes were wasted. In view of this result, the legal scholar Hans-Peter Schneider called a reduction in the threshold "constitutionally required". The political scientist and party researcher Hans Herbert von Arnim spoke of these voters as "double losers". On the one hand, their chosen party is not represented in the Bundestag and on the other hand, this increases the power of the winning parties. Arnim suggested to Spiegel Online that a substitute vote system be created.

Political scientist Frank Decker considers the threshold clause to be a restriction on the equality of the election. Parties that represent different positions have no chance "to present their opinion in the Bundestag and force the other parties to deal with it". This is "questionable from a democratic point of view". On Deutschlandradio, legal scholar Ulrich Battis described the fact that almost seven million votes remain without effect as "difficult to reconcile with the principle of democracy".

The Green Party member of the Bundestag, Hans-Christian Ströbele, described the five percent hurdle as "questionable in terms of democratic law" and, like the former President of the Constitutional Court, Hans-Jürgen Papier, spoke in favor of a lower hurdle of three percent. The civil rights activist and chairman of the association Mehr Demokratie, Ralf-Uwe Beck, also criticized the status quo and said that the solution would be either "to lower or abolish the five percent threshold" or "a substitute vote for voters who assume that their favored party may be stuck with the threshold." The political scientist Heinrich Oberreuter concluded: "The fact that 15 percent of the votes are lost and the election result is thus significantly distorted is worth thinking about. One could think about whether the five percent threshold is still appropriate at this level - given the fact that we have a certain degree of stabilization of the political system."

== See also ==
- Four percent threshold
- One man, one vote
- Party finance in Germany
