= Fraktion (Bundestag) =

Groupings in the German Bundestag

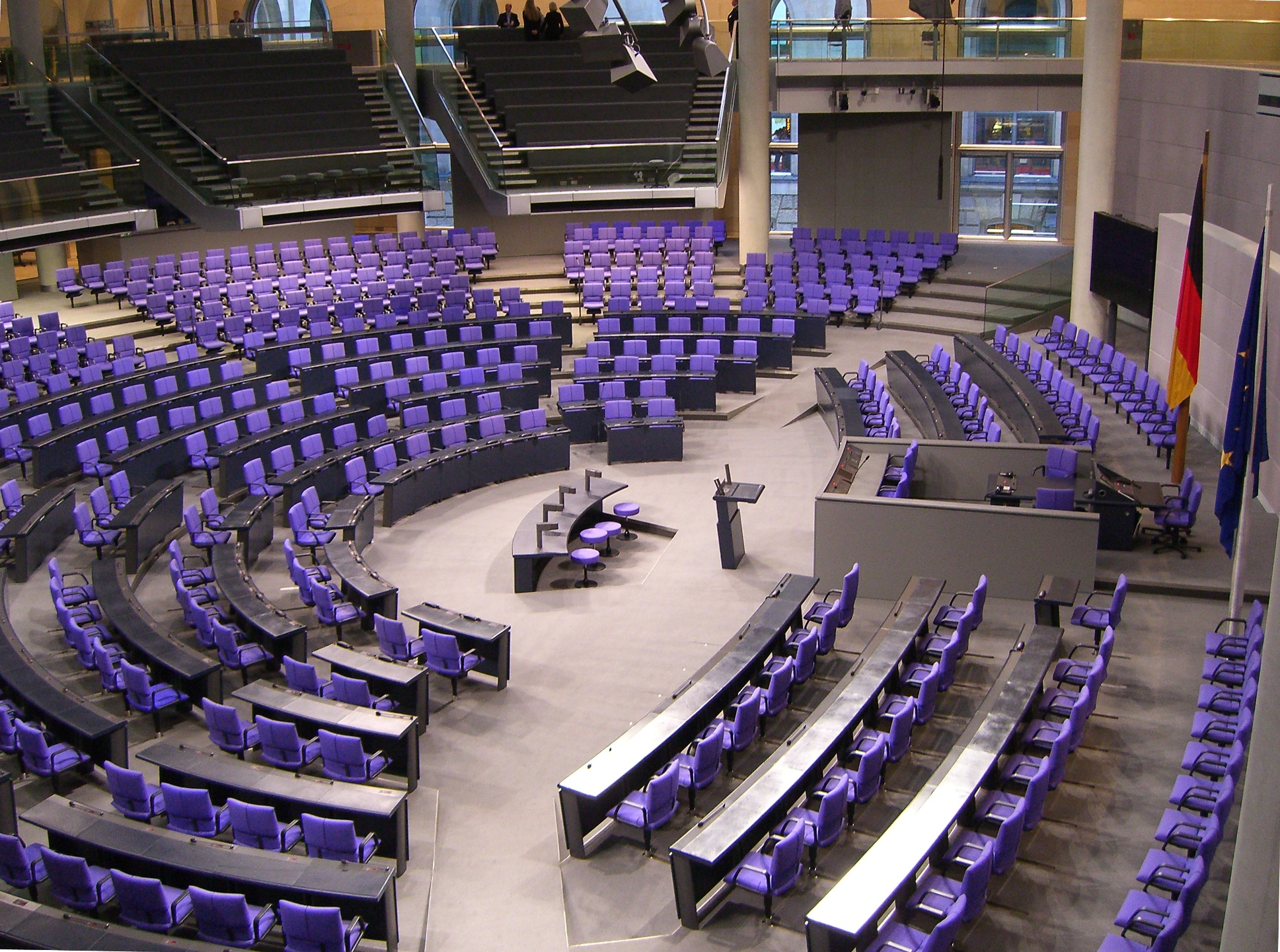
The plenary hall of the German Bundestag is divided into fractions.

Fraktion (English: faction or fraction) is the name given to recognized parliamentary groups in the German Bundestag. In order to form a recognized parliamentary group (Fraktion), a lesser group (Gruppe) needs at least 5% of the members of the Bundestag. As there is also a 5% election threshold, with parties over this threshold usually getting assigned more than 5% of the seats, almost all groups can nearly automatically declare themselves fractions, but due to conflicts, or as a result of below-threshold access granted to regional groups, this is not always the case. Also, even a group has to have at least three members to become recognized as a Gruppe and gain more rights than independent members have.

== Current fractions ==
Following German unification in October 1990, members of the East German parliament joined, resulting in some joint ventures until the 1990 German federal election in December.

- CDU/CSU fraction since September 1949
  - October 1990 to December 1990 CDU/CSU/DSU fraction
- SPD fraction since September 1949
- Alliance 90/The Greens parliamentary group since October 1994
  - Faction The Greens March 1983 to October 1990
  - Faction The Greens/Alliance 90 October 1990 to December 1990
  - Group Alliance 90/The Greens, December 1990 to October 1994
- The Left faction September 2005 to December 2023 and since February 2025
  - The Left group from February 2024 to February 2025
  - Group BSW from February 2024 to February 2025
- AfD parliamentary group since September 2017

== Former factions ==
In the early years of the Bundestag, 1949 to 1960, several parties had faction or group status before disappearing. After that, the only groups existing were formed by members of the former SED. The FDP fraction dissolved in 2025 after not being reelected to the Bundestag.

- Group of the PDS October 1990 to September 1998
- PDS faction September 1998 to September 2002
- FDP fraction September 1949 to October 2013 and September 2017 to March 2025

== See also ==
- Group status in German state parliaments
- Parliamentary group (Germany)
