= Peter Porsch =

German politician

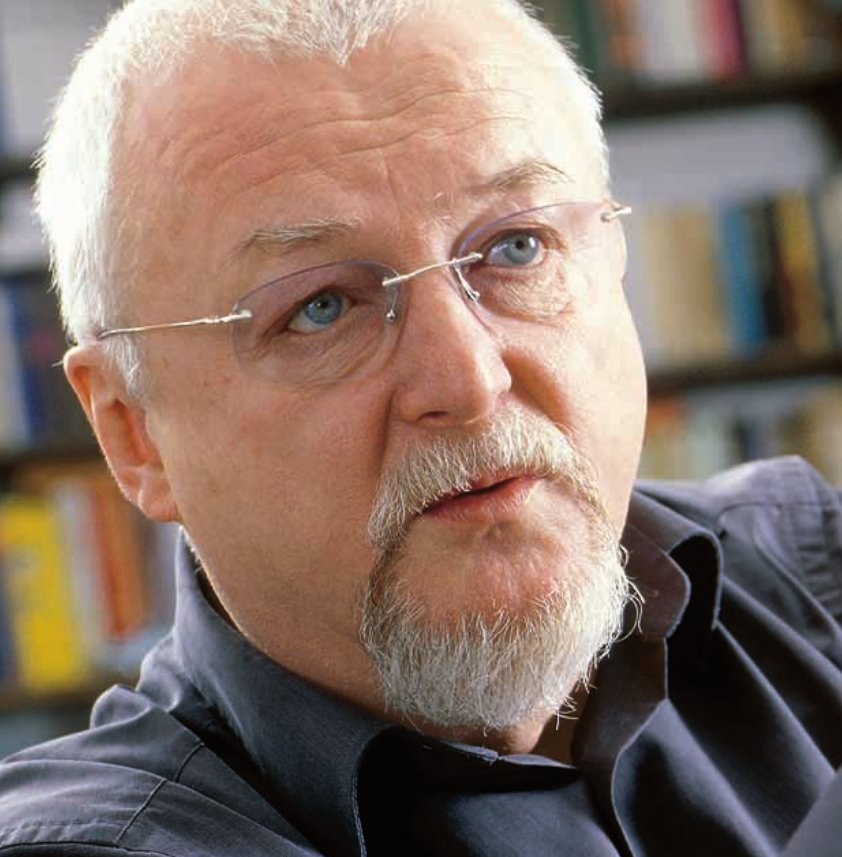
Peter Porsch

Peter Porsch (born 15 October 1944 in Vienna) is a German academic and politician. From 1990 till 2009 he was a member of the Parliament of Saxony for the far-left party Die Linke. He headed the parliamentary group of his party between 1994 and 2009.

== Biography ==
He was raised in Austria, but settled in the German Democratic Republic in 1973, taking East German citizenship in 1979. From 1970 until the 1980s he was an informant for the Stasi under the code name IM Christoph, as was later established by the Commissioner for the Stasi Archives.

In the 1973 he took a job at the "Karl Marx University" (as it was then known) in Leipzig, initially as a research assistant and later as a senior researcher in the Department for German Studies / Linguistics, which he had already studied for his first degree at Vienna University from 1962 till 1968. He pursued his academic career at Leipzig for more than three decades, obtaining his habilitation in 1981 for work on "Text evaluation as a Method for gathering language-communicative norms" and obtaining a professorship in 1988.

He was fired from his job at the University of Leipzig in 2004 without any notice period, after his Stasi past was revealed.

Porsch became a member of the SED in 1982. From 1991 to 1995 and from 1997 to 2001 he was chairman of the Partei des Demokratischen Sozialismus in Saxony, and was elected to the Parliament of Saxony in 1990, and has headed the PDS/Die Linke faction since 1994. He was vice president of the PDS from 2000 to 2003.

On 11 May 2006 the Parliament of Saxony decided with great majority to open a case against Porsch at the Constitutional Court of Saxony in order to revoke his parliamentary seat, according to article 118 of the Saxon Constitution, as a consequence of his Stasi past. The case was denied in November that year for formal reasons, since the time limit to open a case had lapsed.
