= Kamenz (district) =

Coordinates: 51.2667°N 14.1000°E

- District
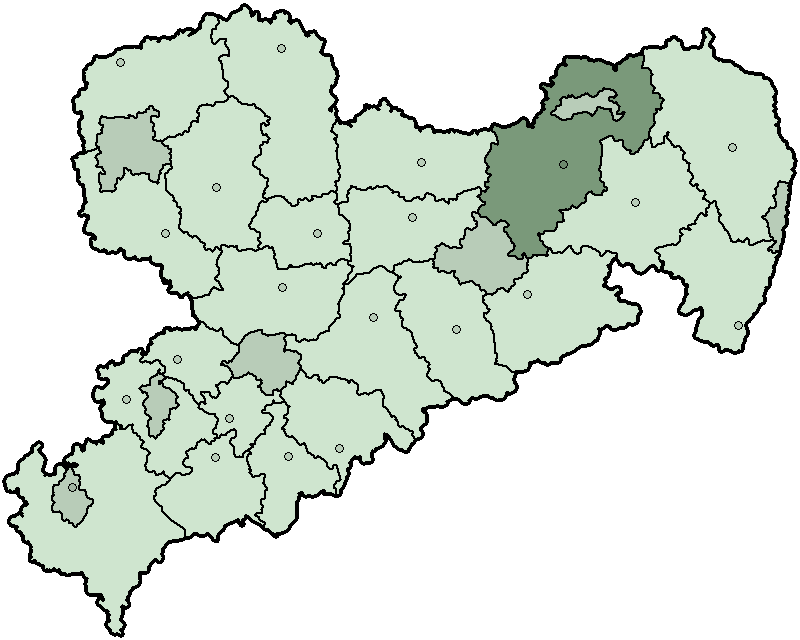
- Country: Germany
- State: Saxony
- Adm. region: Dresden
- Disbanded: 2008-08-01
- Capital: Kamenz

Area
  - Total: 1,340.34 km^{2} (517.51 sq mi)

Population (2001)
  - Total: 154,954
  - Density: 115.608/km^{2} (299.423/sq mi)
- Time zone: UTC+01:00 (CET)
  - Summer (DST): UTC+02:00 (CEST)
- Vehicle registration: KM
- Website: www.lra-kamenz.de

Kamenz (Sorbian languages: Kamjenc, pronounced [ˈkamʲɛnts]) was a Kreis (district) in the north-east of Saxony, Germany. Neighboring districts were (from north clockwise) Oberspreewald-Lausitz, Spree-Neiße, Niederschlesischer Oberlausitzkreis, Bautzen - Budyšin, Sächsische Schweiz, the district-free city Dresden - Drježdźany, and the districts Meißen and Riesa-Großenhain. The district-free city Hoyerswerda was surrounded by the district.

== History ==
The district was formed in 1994 from the previous Kamenz district, the northern parts of the Dresden-Land district, around Radeberg, and the Hoyerswerda district, except the town of Hoyerswerda, which became a district-free city. From 1994 to 1996 it was called Westlausitz - Dresdner Land, but then renamed to Kamenz again. In August 2008, the Kamenz district and Hoyerswerda were merged into the district of Bautzen.

== Geography ==
The two major rivers in the district were the Spree and the Schwarze Elster (Black Elster).

== Partnerships ==
Since December 14, 1990 the district had a partnership with the district Alzey-Worms in Rhineland-Palatinate.

== Coat of arms ==
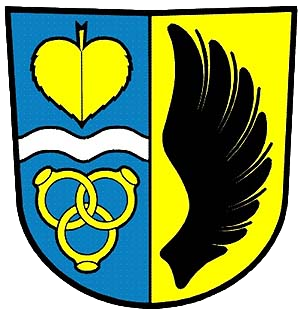
The colors of the coat of arms are those of the Upper Lusatia. The black wing on the right side is the symbol of the Lords of Kamenz. The linden leaf in the top of the left half stands for the Sorbian minority. The wavy line below symbolizes the three rivers Röder, Elster and Spree. The three rings in the bottom symbolize the unification of the three previous districts, the symbol was taken from the play "Nathan der Weise" by Lessing.

== Towns and municipalities ==
Towns
1. Bernsdorf
2. Elstra
3. Großröhrsdorf
4. Kamenz
5. Königsbrück
6. Lauta
7. Pulsnitz
8. Radeberg
9. Wittichenau
Municipalities
1. Arnsdorf
2. Bretnig-Hauswalde
3. Crostwitz
4. Elsterheide
5. Großnaundorf
6. Haselbachtal
7. Laußnitz
8. Lichtenberg
9. Lohsa
10. Nebelschütz
11. Neukirch
12. Oberlichtenau

13. Ohorn
14. Oßling
15. Ottendorf-Okrilla
16. Panschwitz-Kuckau
17. Ralbitz-Rosenthal
18. Räckelwitz
19. Schönteichen
20. Schwepnitz
21. Spreetal
22. Steina
23. Wachau
24. Wiednitz
