= Bautzen 4/Budyšin 4 =

State electoral district of Germany

55: Bautzen 4/Budyšin 4
- Electoral district for the Landtag of Saxony
- Bautzen 4/Budyšin 4 in 2024
- District: Bautzen
- Electorate: 48,673 (2024)
- Major settlements: Hoyerswerda and Lauta

Current electoral district
- Party: AfD
- Member: Doreen Schwietzer

Bautzen 4/Budyšin 4 is an electoral constituency (German: Wahlkreis) represented in the Landtag of Saxony. It elects one member via first-past-the-post voting. Under the constituency numbering system, it is designated as constituency 55. It is within the district of Bautzen.

== Geography ==
The constituency comprises the towns of Hoyerswerda and Lauta, and the municipalities of Elsterheide, Königswartha, Lohsa, Neschwitz, Puschwitz, Radibor, and Spreetal within the district of Bautzen.

There were 48,673 eligible voters in 2024.

== Members ==
Election	Member	Party	%
2014	Frank Hirche	CDU	41.7
2019	Doreen Schwietzer	AfD	34.7
2024	Doreen Schwietzer	AfD	43.3

== Election results ==
=== 2024 election ===
State election (2024): Bautzen 4/Budyšin 4
Notes:	Blue background denotes the winner of the electorate vote. Pink background denotes a candidate elected from their party list. Yellow background denotes an electorate win by a list member, or other incumbent. A ✓ or ✗ denotes status of any incumbent, win or lose respectively.						
Party	Candidate	Votes	%	±%	Party votes	%	±%
AfD	✓ Doreen Schwietzer	14,554	43.3	▲8.2	12,842	37.9	▲3.8
CDU	Frank Uwe Hirche	11,931	35.5	▲3.8	10,785	31.8	▼1.0
BSW					4,632	13.7	
FW	Dirk Nasdala	2,693	8.0	▼0.1	770	2.3	▼1.9
SPD	Kirstin Kentsch	1,803	5.4	▼0.2	1,705	5.0	▼1.6
Left	Silvio Lang	1,634	4.9	▼7.5	855	2.5	▼8.1
Freie Sachsen					598	1.8	
Greens	Hagen Domaschke	509	1.5	▼1.8	532	1.6	▼1.5
APT					335	1.0	
FDP	Eddie Friedrich	497	1.5	▼2.4	236	0.7	▼3.2
PARTEI					214	0.6	▼0.3
BD					112	0.3	
Values					70	0.2	
Pirates					57	0.2	
dieBasis					37	0.1	
Bündnis C					29	0.1	
V-Partei3					29	0.1	
BüSo					25	0.1	
ÖDP					13	0.0	
Informal votes		654			399		
Total valid votes		33,621			33,876		
Turnout		34,275	70.4	▲5.9			
AfD hold	Majority	2,623	7.8				

=== 2019 election ===
State election (2019): Bautzen 4/Budyšin 4
Notes:	Blue background denotes the winner of the electorate vote. Pink background denotes a candidate elected from their party list. Yellow background denotes an electorate win by a list member, or other incumbent. A ✓ or ✗ denotes status of any incumbent, win or lose respectively.						
Party	Candidate	Votes	%	±%	Party votes	%	±%
AfD	Doreen Schwietzer	9,665	34.7		9,452	33.9	▲24.4
CDU	✗ Frank Hirche	9,020	32.4	▼9.3	9,346	33.5	▼8.8
Left	Ralph Büchner	3,498	12.6	▼13.0	2,981	10.7	▼10.5
FW	Dirk Nasdala	2,242	8.0	▼1.4	1,119	4.0	▲0.2
SPD	Kevin Stanulla	1,558	5.6	▼3.0	1,855	6.6	▼3.4
FDP	Ina Desutschmann	1,017	3.7	Steady	1,086	3.9	▲1.0
Greens	Tom Vetter	853	3.1	▲0.6	825	3.0	▲1.1
APT					320	1.1	▲0.4
PARTEI					246	0.9	▲0.4
Verjüngungsforschung					211	0.8	
NPD					135	0.5	▼5.1
The Blue Party					88	0.3	
Pirates					64	0.2	▼0.5
ÖDP					44	0.2	
Awakening of German Patriots - Central Germany					41	0.1	
DKP					32	0.1	
Humanists					29	0.1	
PDV					23	0.1	
BüSo					16	0.1	▼0.1
Informal votes		426			366		
Total valid votes		27,853			27,913		
Turnout		28,279	63.1	▲18.3			
AfD gain from CDU	Majority	645	2.3				

=== 2014 election ===
State election (2014): Bautzen 4
Notes:	Blue background denotes the winner of the electorate vote. Pink background denotes a candidate elected from their party list. Yellow background denotes an electorate win by a list member, or other incumbent. A ✓ or ✗ denotes status of any incumbent, win or lose respectively.						
Party	Candidate	Votes	%	±%	Party votes	%	±%
CDU	Frank Hirche	8,763	41.7		8,940	42.3	
Left		5,366	25.6		4,491	21.2	
FW		1,982	9.4		811	3.8	
SPD		1,806	8.6		2,119	10.0	
AfD					2,013	9.5	
NPD		1,496	7.1		1,179	5.6	
FDP		770	3.7		608	2.9	
Greens		528	2.5		396	1.9	
Pirates		290	1.4		155	0.7	
APT					150	0.7	
PARTEI					105	0.5	
Pro Germany Citizens' Movement					78	0.4	
DSU					72	0.3	
BüSo					36	0.2	
Informal votes		501			349		
Total valid votes		21,001			21,153		
Turnout		21,502	44.8	▼5.9			
CDU win new seat	Majority	3,397	16.1				

== See also ==
- Politics of Saxony
- Landtag of Saxony
