= Bautzen 2/Budyšin 2 =

State electoral district of Germany

53: Bautzen 2/Budyšin 2
- Electoral district for the Landtag of Saxony
- Bautzen 2/Budyšin 2 in 2024
- District: Bautzen
- Electorate: 47,316 (2024)
- Major settlements: Elstra, Großröhrsdorf, Kamenz, and Pulsnitz

Current electoral district
- Party: CDU
- Member: Elaine Jentsch

Bautzen 2/Budyšin 2 is an electoral constituency (German: Wahlkreis) represented in the Landtag of Saxony. It elects one member via first-past-the-post voting. Under the constituency numbering system, it is designated as constituency 53. It is within the district of Bautzen.

== Geography ==
The constituency comprises the towns of Elstra, Großröhrsdorf, Kamenz, and Pulsnitz, and the municipalities of Arnsdorf, Crostwitz, Großnaundorf, Haselbachtal, Lichtenberg, Nebelschütz, Ohorn, Panschwitz-Kuckau, Räckelwitz, Ralbitz-Rosenthal, and Steina within the district of Bautzen.

There were 47,316 eligible voters in 2024.

== Members ==
Election	Member	Party	%
2014	Aloysius Mikwauschk	CDU	47.0
2019	Aloysius Mikwauschk	CDU	39.8
2024	Elaine Jentsch	CDU	44.0

== Election results ==
=== 2024 election ===
State election (2024): Bautzen 2/Budyšin 2
Notes:	Blue background denotes the winner of the electorate vote. Pink background denotes a candidate elected from their party list. Yellow background denotes an electorate win by a list member, or other incumbent. A ✓ or ✗ denotes status of any incumbent, win or lose respectively.						
Party	Candidate	Votes	%	±%	Party votes	%	±%
CDU	Elaine Jentsch	15,593	44.0	▲4.2	12,701	35.6	▼0.2
AfD	Ralf-Peter Hechtberger	14,028	39.6	▲9.2	12,578	35.2	▲4.2
BSW					4,056	11.4	
FW	Günter Hutschalik	1,565	4.4	▼0.8	705	2.0	▼1.4
Left	Ines Enns	1,380	3.9	▼6.6	792	2.2	▼5.8
SPD	Jurij Petr Bulang	1,274	3.6	▼1.2	1,853	5.2	▼0.7
FDP	Matthias Schniebel	722	2.0	▼4.0	357	1.0	▼5.4
Greens	Mathias Höhle	503	1.4	▼2.0	825	2.3	▼2.1
Freie Sachsen	M. Carsten Fuchs	387	1.1		795	2.2	
APT					327	0.9	
PARTEI					207	0.6	▼0.5
BD					119	0.3	
Values					109	0.3	
Pirates					73	0.2	
dieBasis					57	0.2	
Bündnis C					41	0.1	
BüSo					38	0.1	
V-Partei3					32	0.1	
ÖDP					28	0.1	
Informal votes		573			332		
Total valid votes		35,452			35,693		
Turnout		36,025	76.1	▲8.9			
CDU hold	Majority	1,565	4.4				

=== 2019 election ===
State election (2019): Bautzen 2/Budyšin 2
Notes:	Blue background denotes the winner of the electorate vote. Pink background denotes a candidate elected from their party list. Yellow background denotes an electorate win by a list member, or other incumbent. A ✓ or ✗ denotes status of any incumbent, win or lose respectively.						
Party	Candidate	Votes	%	±%	Party votes	%	±%
CDU	✓ Aloysius Mikwauschk	12,987	39.8	▼7.3	11,700	35.8	▼10.1
AfD	Christian Friedrich Schultze	9,918	30.4		10,152	31.0	▲20.8
Left	Marion Junge	3,409	10.4	▼10.7	2,611	8.0	▼8.1
FDP	Matthias Schniebel	1,955	6.0	▲1.0	2,081	6.4	▲1.7
FW	Günter Hutschalik	1,698	5.2	▲1.9	1,119	3.4	▲1.6
SPD	Kathrin Michel	1,560	4.8	▼4.8	1,931	5.9	▼3.7
Greens	Gerd Kitchhübel	1,104	3.4	▼0.1	1,442	4.4	▲1.3
APT					430	1.3	▲0.3
PARTEI					356	1.1	▲0.6
Verjüngungsforschung					218	0.7	
NPD					168	0.5	▼5.3
ÖDP					120	0.4	
The Blue Party					96	0.3	
Pirates					77	0.2	▼0.7
Humanists					53	0.2	
Awakening of German Patriots - Central Germany					52	0.2	
PDV					43	0.1	
BüSo					27	0.1	▼0.1
DKP					21	0.1	
Informal votes		444			378		
Total valid votes		32,631			32,697		
Turnout		33,075	68.3	▲13.8			
CDU hold	Majority	3,069	9.4	▼16.6			

=== 2014 election ===
State election (2014): Bautzen 2
Notes:	Blue background denotes the winner of the electorate vote. Pink background denotes a candidate elected from their party list. Yellow background denotes an electorate win by a list member, or other incumbent. A ✓ or ✗ denotes status of any incumbent, win or lose respectively.						
Party	Candidate	Votes	%	±%	Party votes	%	±%
CDU	Aloysius Mikwauschk	12,478	47.1		12,265	45.9	
Left		5,593	21.1		4,293	16.1	
AfD					2,717	10.2	
SPD		2,550	9.6		2,557	9.6	
NPD		1,899	7.2		1,546	5.8	
FDP		1,319	5.0		1,249	4.7	
Greens		924	3.5		840	3.1	
FW		887	3.3		487	1.8	
APT					265	1.0	
Pirates		452	1.7		237	0.9	
Independent	Konrad Skatula	418	1.6				
PARTEI					132	0.5	
BüSo					53	0.2	
Pro Germany Citizens' Movement					39	0.1	
DSU					36	0.1	
Informal votes		629			433		
Total valid votes		26,520			26,716		
Turnout		27,149	54.5	▼1.7			
CDU win new seat	Majority	6,885	26.0				

== See also ==
- Politics of Saxony
- Landtag of Saxony
