= Jentsch =

Jentsch is a German surname. Notable people with the surname include:

- Adolph Jentsch (1888–1977), German-born Namibian artist
- Daniela Jentsch (born 1982), German curler
- Elaine Jentsch (born 1994), German politician
- Ernst Jentsch (1867–1919), German psychiatrist
- J. David Jentsch (born 1972), American neurobiologist
- Julia Jentsch (born 1978), German actress
- Martina Jentsch, (born 1968), German gymnast
- Roland Jentsch, German curler
- Stefan Jentsch (1955–2016), German biologist
