= Frankenthal (disambiguation) =

Frankenthal is a German name which may refer to:

- Frankenthal, a city in Rhineland-Palatinate, Germany
- Frankenthal, Saxony, a municipality in Saxony, Germany
- Hans Frankenthal (1926-1999), Holocaust survivor
- Frankenthal (grape), another name for the German/Italian wine grape Trollinger
