= Doreen Schwietzer =

German politician (born 1972)

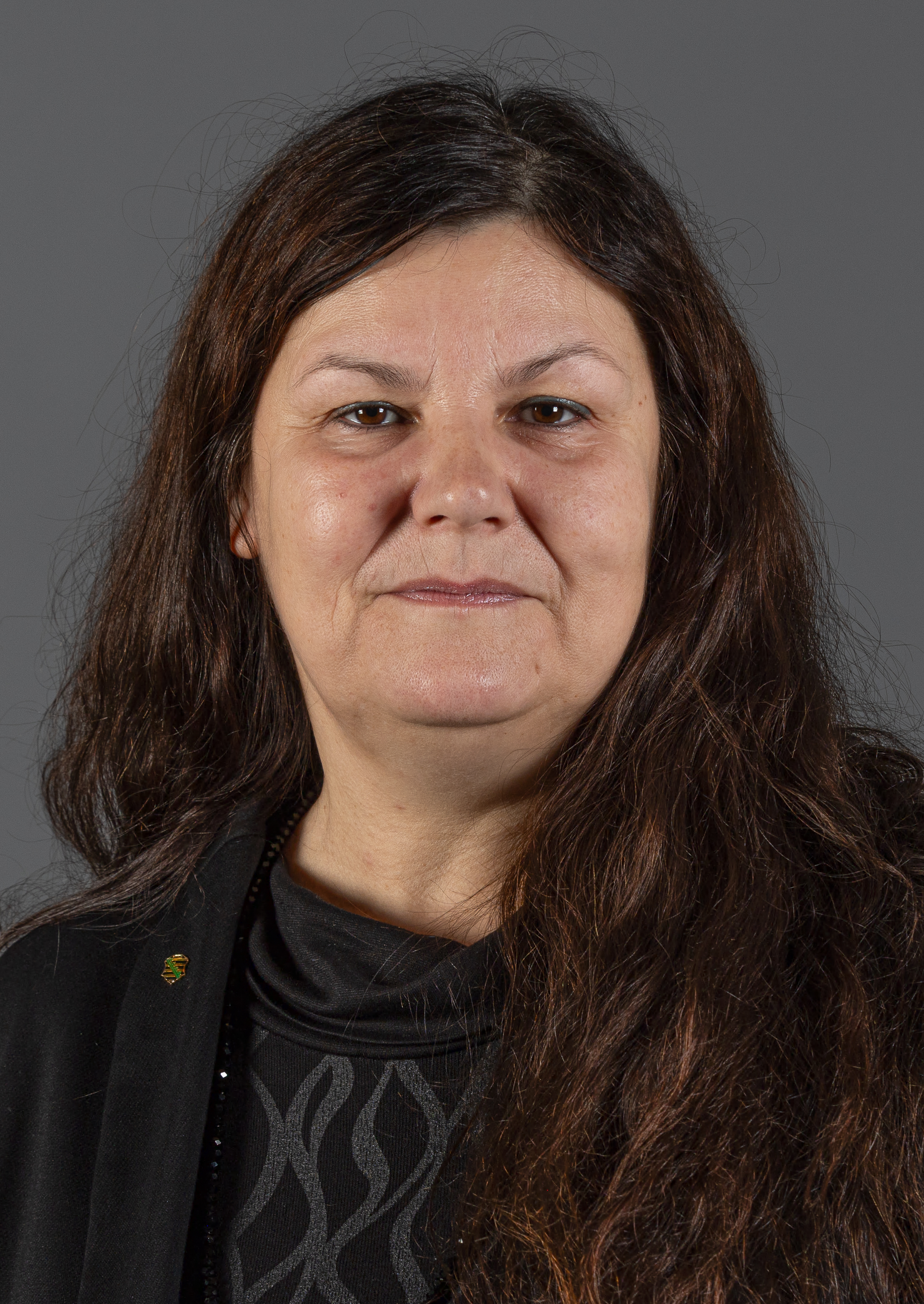
- Schwietzer in 2025

Member of the Landtag of Saxony
- Incumbent
- Assumed office 1 October 2019
- Preceded by: Frank Hirche
- Constituency: Bautzen 4/Budyšin 4

Personal details
- Born: 1972 (age 53–54)
- Party: Alternative for Germany (since 2018)

Doreen Schwietzer (born 1972) is a German politician serving as a member of the Landtag of Saxony since 2019. From 2018 to 2022, she served as honorary federal auditor of the Alternative for Germany.
