= Elaine Jentsch =

German politician (born 1994)

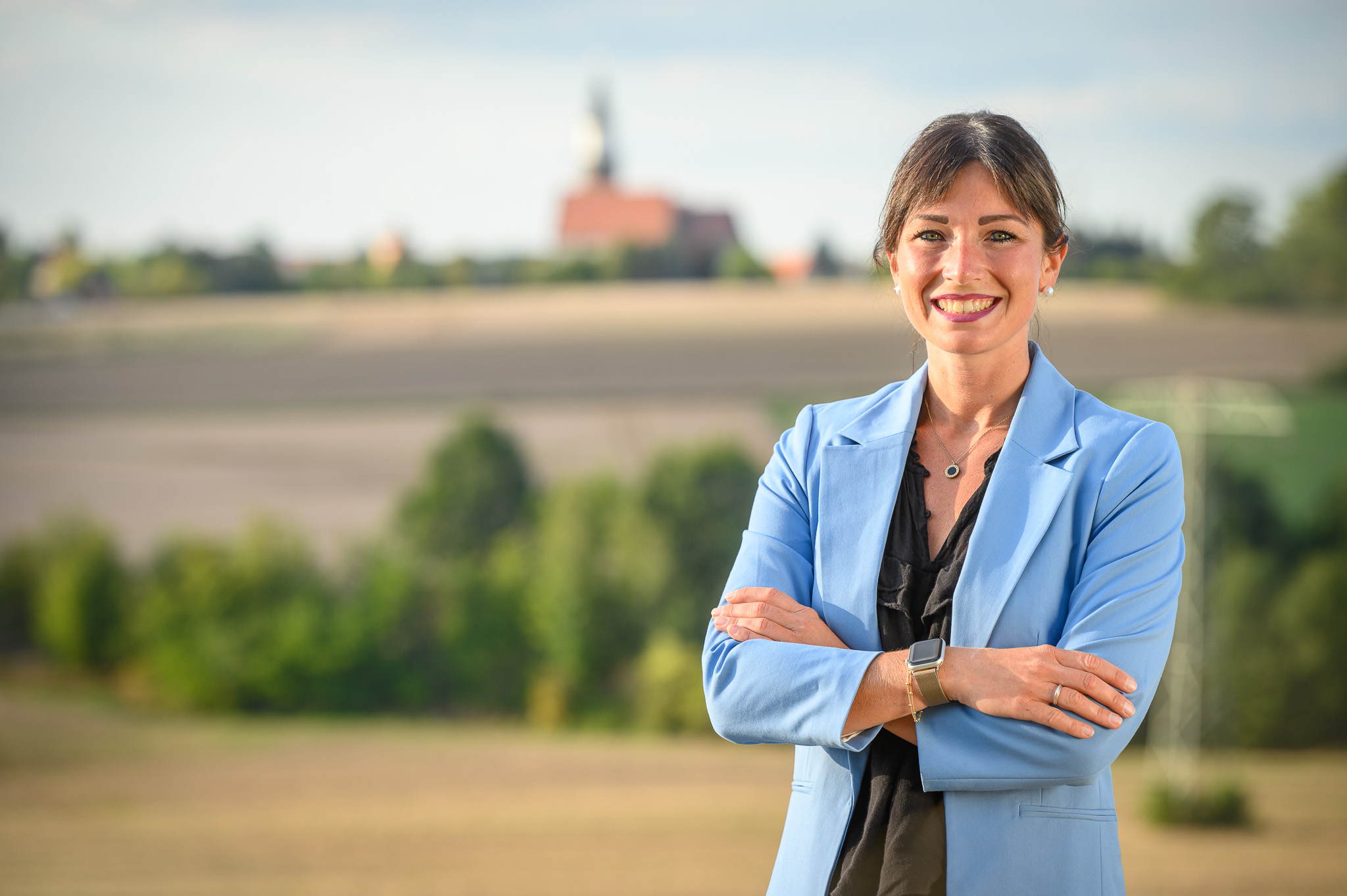
- Jentsch in 2023

Member of the Landtag of Saxony
- Incumbent
- Assumed office 1 September 2024
- Preceded by: Aloysius Mikwauschk
- Constituency: Bautzen 2

Personal details
- Born: 17 July 1994 (age 31)
- Party: Christian Democratic Union (since 2017)

Elaine Jentsch (born 17 July 1994) is a German politician serving as a member of the Landtag of Saxony since 2024. From 2021 to 2024, she served as managing director of the Mittelstands- und Wirtschaftsunion in Saxony.
