= Elstra =

Elstra/Halštrow
- Town
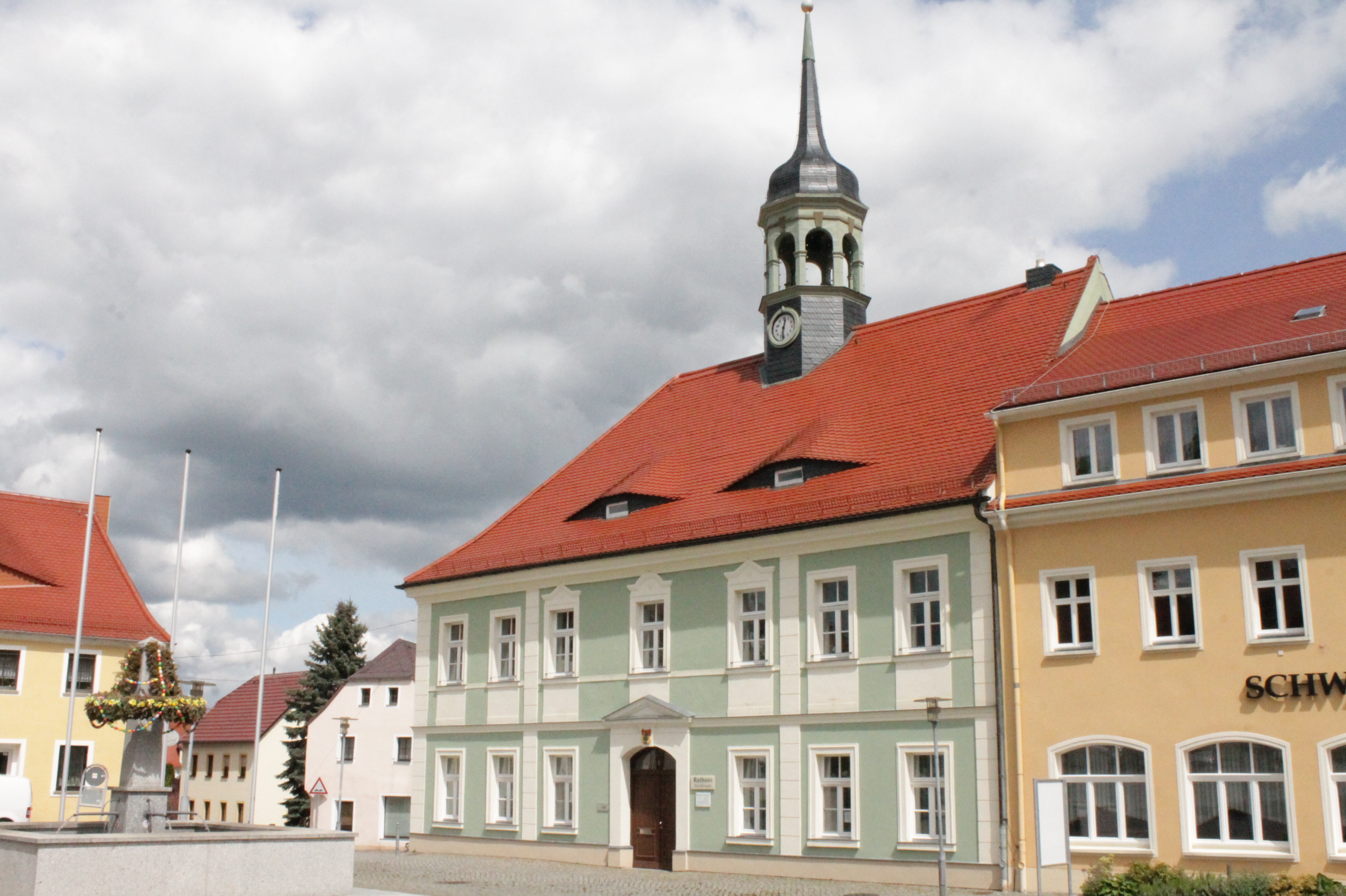
- Town hall

- Coat of arms

- Location of Elstra/Halštrow within Bautzen district
- Interactive map of Elstra/Halštrow
- Location within Germany Location within Saxony
- Coordinates: 51°13′15″N 14°7′51″E
- Country: Germany
- State: Saxony
- District: Bautzen
- Subdivisions: 13

Government
  - Mayor (2022–29): Frank Wachholz

Area
  - Total: 32.63 km^{2} (12.60 sq mi)
- Elevation: 200 m (660 ft)

Population (2025-12-31)
  - Total: 2,657
  - Density: 81.43/km^{2} (210.9/sq mi)
- Time zone: UTC+01:00 (CET)
  - Summer (DST): UTC+02:00 (CEST)
- Postal codes: 01920
- Dialling codes: 035793
- Vehicle registration: BZ, BIW, HY, KM
- Website: www.elstra.de

Elstra (German, pronounced [ˈɛlstʁaː]) or Halštrow (Upper Sorbian, pronounced [ˈhalʃtʁɔf]) is a town in the district of Bautzen, in Saxony, Germany. It is situated on the river Schwarze Elster, 6 kilometres southeast of Kamenz, and 34 kilometres northeast of Dresden. The name "Elstra" stems from the river Schwarze Elster, which rises in the district Kindisch.

The city has only about 2,000 citizens and is one of the smallest cities in Germany. The whole municipality has 2,807 citizens (in 2016). It is part of the officially recognized Sorbian settlement area.

Due to the town name's similarity to the word "Elster" (German for magpie), magpies are often used in the town's self-identity.

== Personalities ==
- Georg Derlitzki (1889-1958), important agricultural scientist and economist
- Karl Schön (1923-1994), politician (SPD), born in Elstra
- Otto Garten (1902-2000), artist, born in Elstra
- Karl Eberhard (1820-1907), architect
