= Neukirch (bei Königsbrück) =

- Municipality
- Location of Neukirch within Bautzen district
- Interactive map of Neukirch
- Location within Germany Location within Saxony
- Coordinates: 51°17′14″N 13°58′47″E
- Country: Germany
- State: Saxony
- District: Bautzen
- Subdivisions: 5

Government
  - Mayor (2022–29): Harald Haase

Area
  - Total: 39.47 km^{2} (15.24 sq mi)
- Elevation: 190 m (620 ft)

Population (2025-12-31)
  - Total: 1,585
  - Density: 40.16/km^{2} (104.0/sq mi)
- Time zone: UTC+01:00 (CET)
  - Summer (DST): UTC+02:00 (CEST)
- Postal codes: 01936
- Dialling codes: 035795
- Vehicle registration: BZ, BIW, HY, KM

Neukirch (German pronunciation: [ˈnɔʏkɪʁç]) is a municipality in the district of Bautzen, in Saxony, Germany.
