= Steina =

- Municipality
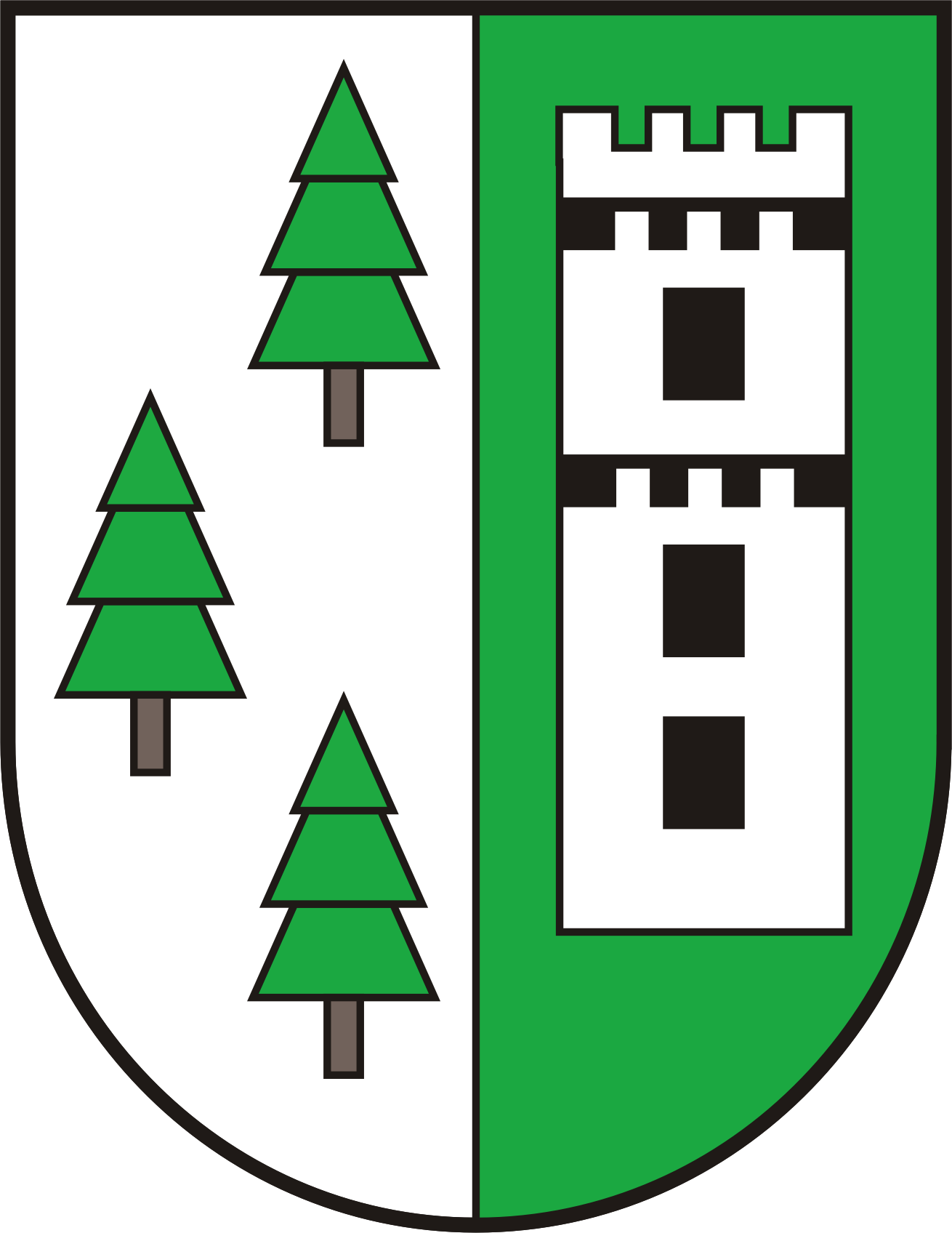
- Coat of arms

- Location of Steina within Bautzen district
- Interactive map of Steina
- Location within Germany Location within Saxony
- Coordinates: 51°12′N 14°3′E
- Country: Germany
- State: Saxony
- District: Bautzen
- Subdivisions: 2

Government
  - Mayor (2019–26): Sandro Bürger (CDU)

Area
  - Total: 12.51 km^{2} (4.83 sq mi)
- Elevation: 337 m (1,106 ft)

Population (2025-12-31)
  - Total: 1,646
  - Density: 131.6/km^{2} (340.8/sq mi)
- Time zone: UTC+01:00 (CET)
  - Summer (DST): UTC+02:00 (CEST)
- Postal codes: 01920
- Dialling codes: 035955
- Vehicle registration: BZ, BIW, HY, KM
- Website: www.steina-sachsen.de

Steina (German pronunciation: [ˈʃtaɪna]; Upper Sorbian: Stejna) is a municipality in the district of Bautzen, in Saxony, Germany.
