= Spreetal =

Spreetal/Sprjewiny Doł
- Municipality
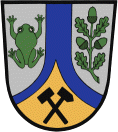
- Coat of arms

- Location of Spreetal/Sprjewiny Doł within Bautzen district
- Interactive map of Spreetal/Sprjewiny Doł
- Location within Germany Location within Saxony
- Coordinates: 51°31′N 14°22′E
- Country: Germany
- State: Saxony
- District: Bautzen
- Subdivisions: 7

Government
  - Mayor (2017–24): Manfred Heine

Area
  - Total: 108.73 km^{2} (41.98 sq mi)
- Elevation: 158 m (518 ft)

Population (2025-12-31)
  - Total: 1,674
  - Density: 15.40/km^{2} (39.88/sq mi)
- Demonym(s): German: Spreetaler; Upper Sorbian: Sprjewinodolski
- Time zone: UTC+01:00 (CET)
  - Summer (DST): UTC+02:00 (CEST)
- Postal codes: 02979
- Dialling codes: 035727
- Vehicle registration: BZ, BIW, HY, KM
- Website: www.spreetal.de

Spreetal (German, pronounced [ˈʃpʁeːtaːl]) or Sprjewiny Doł (Upper Sorbian, pronounced [ˈspʁʲɛwʲinɨ ˈdɔw]) (both lit. 'Spree Valley') is a municipality in the district of Bautzen, in Saxony, Germany.

The municipality is part of the recognized Sorbian settlement area in Saxony. Upper Sorbian has an official status next to German, all villages bear names in both languages.

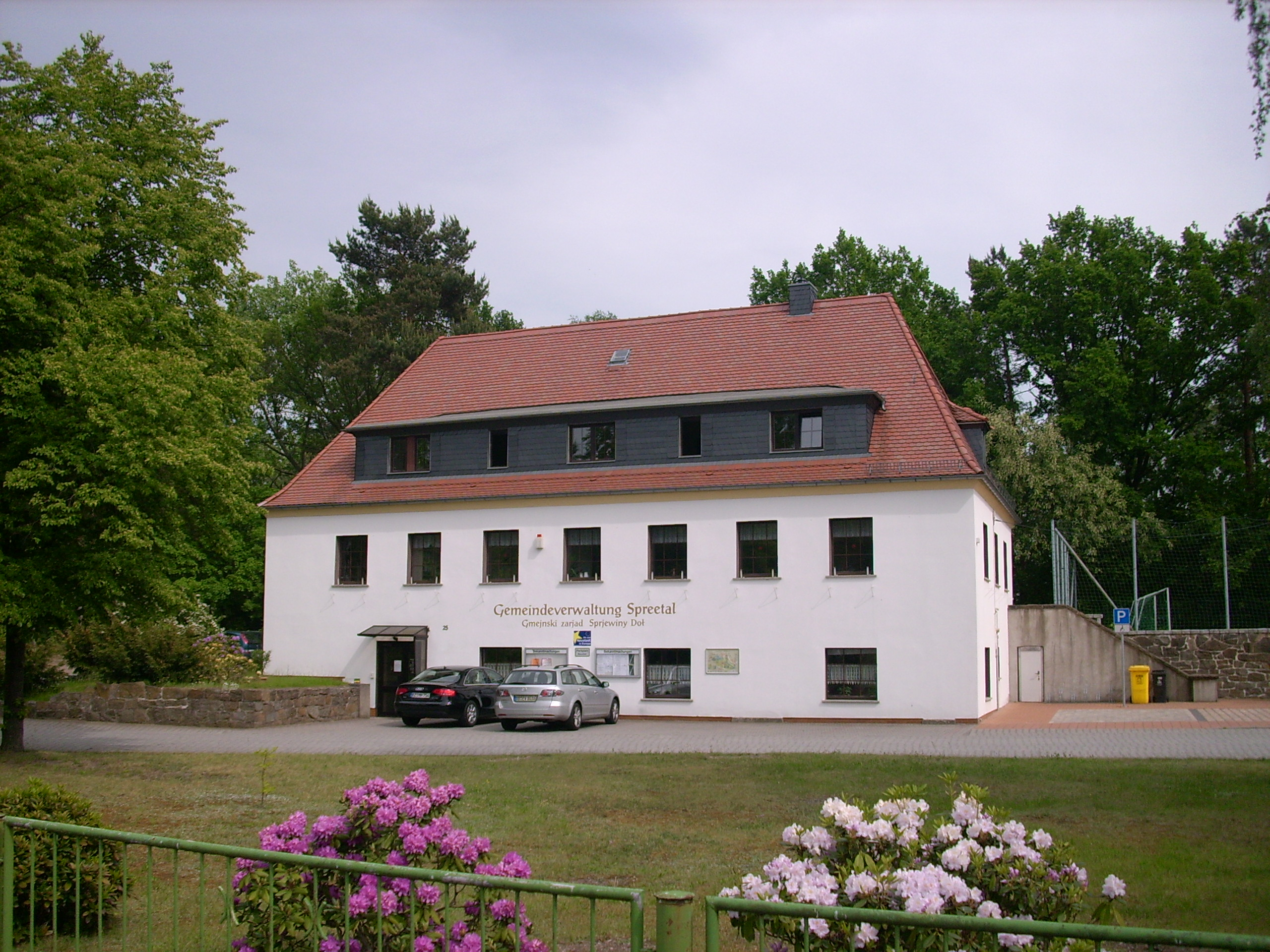
Municipal administration of Spreetal

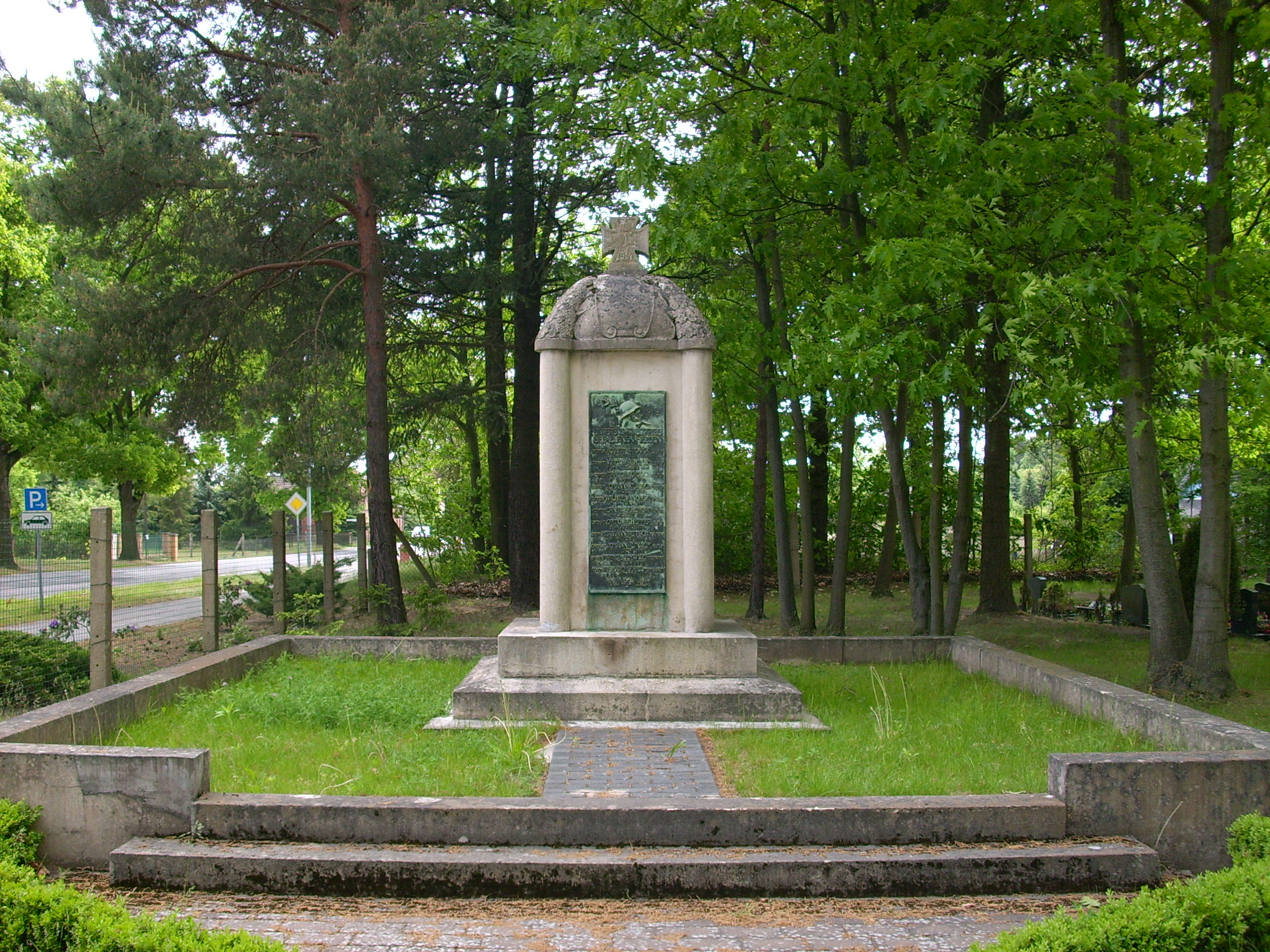
War memorial in Burgneudorf, district of Spreetal

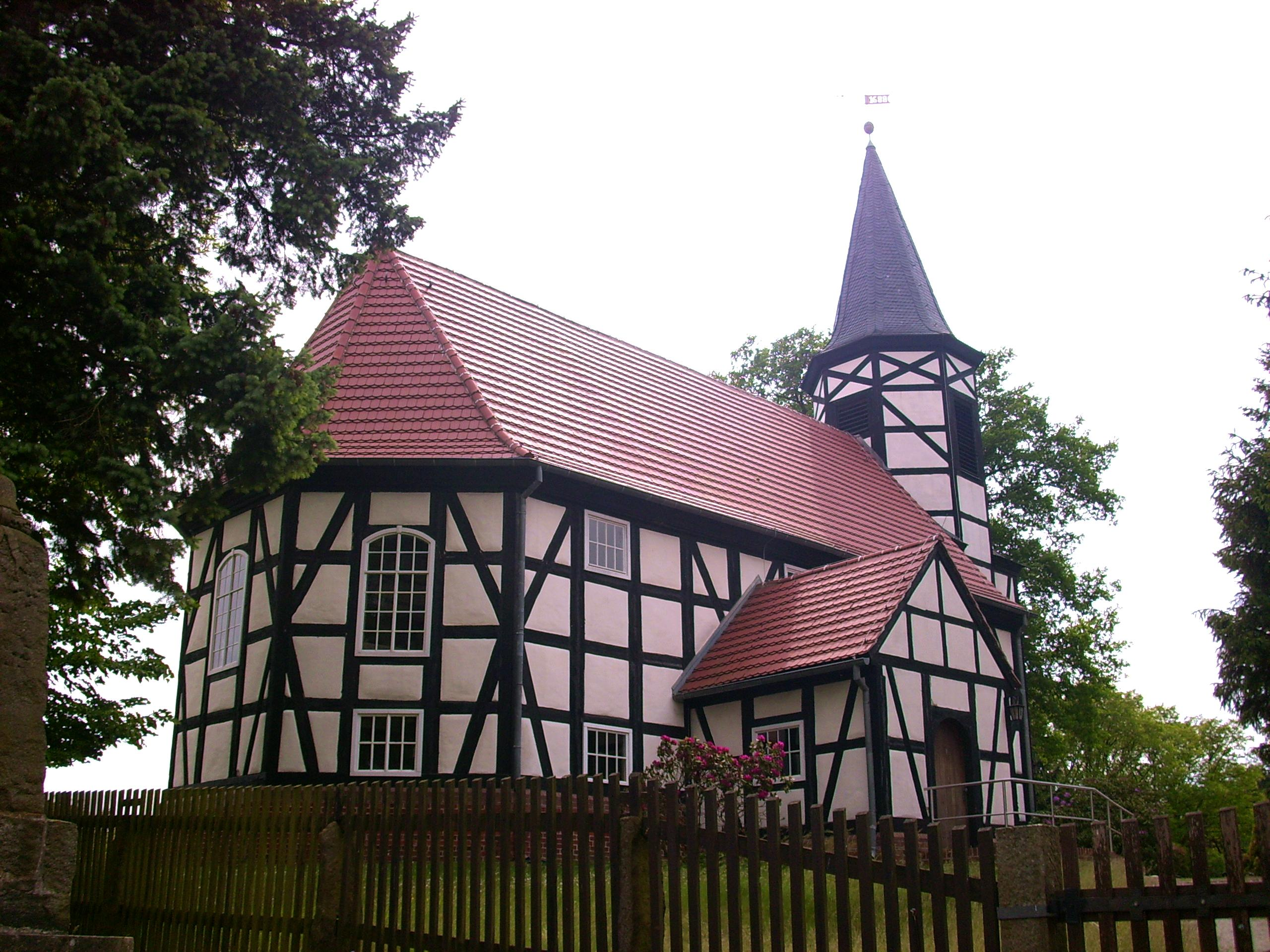
Church in Spreewitz, district of Spreetal

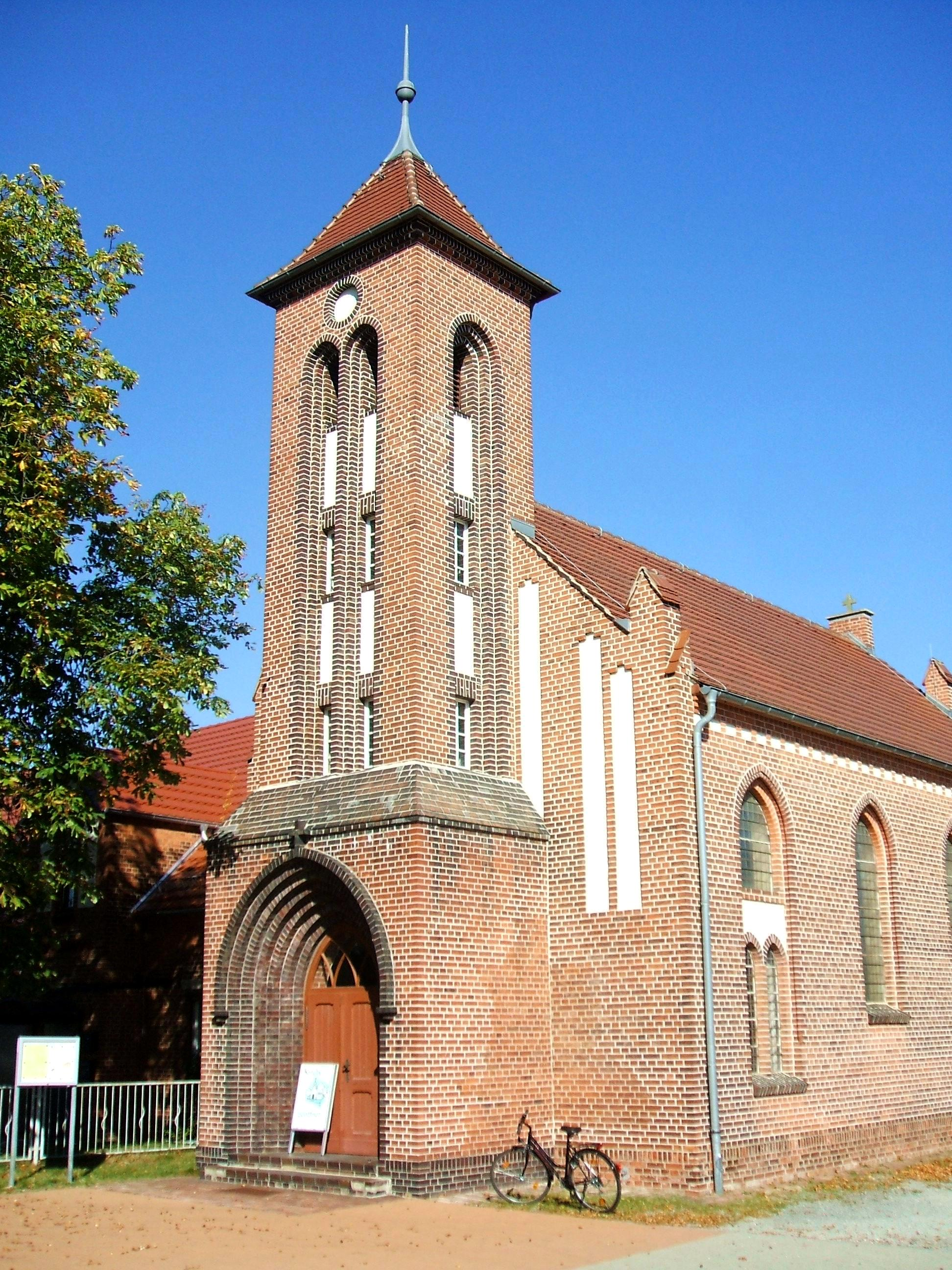
Church in Burghammer, district of Spreetal

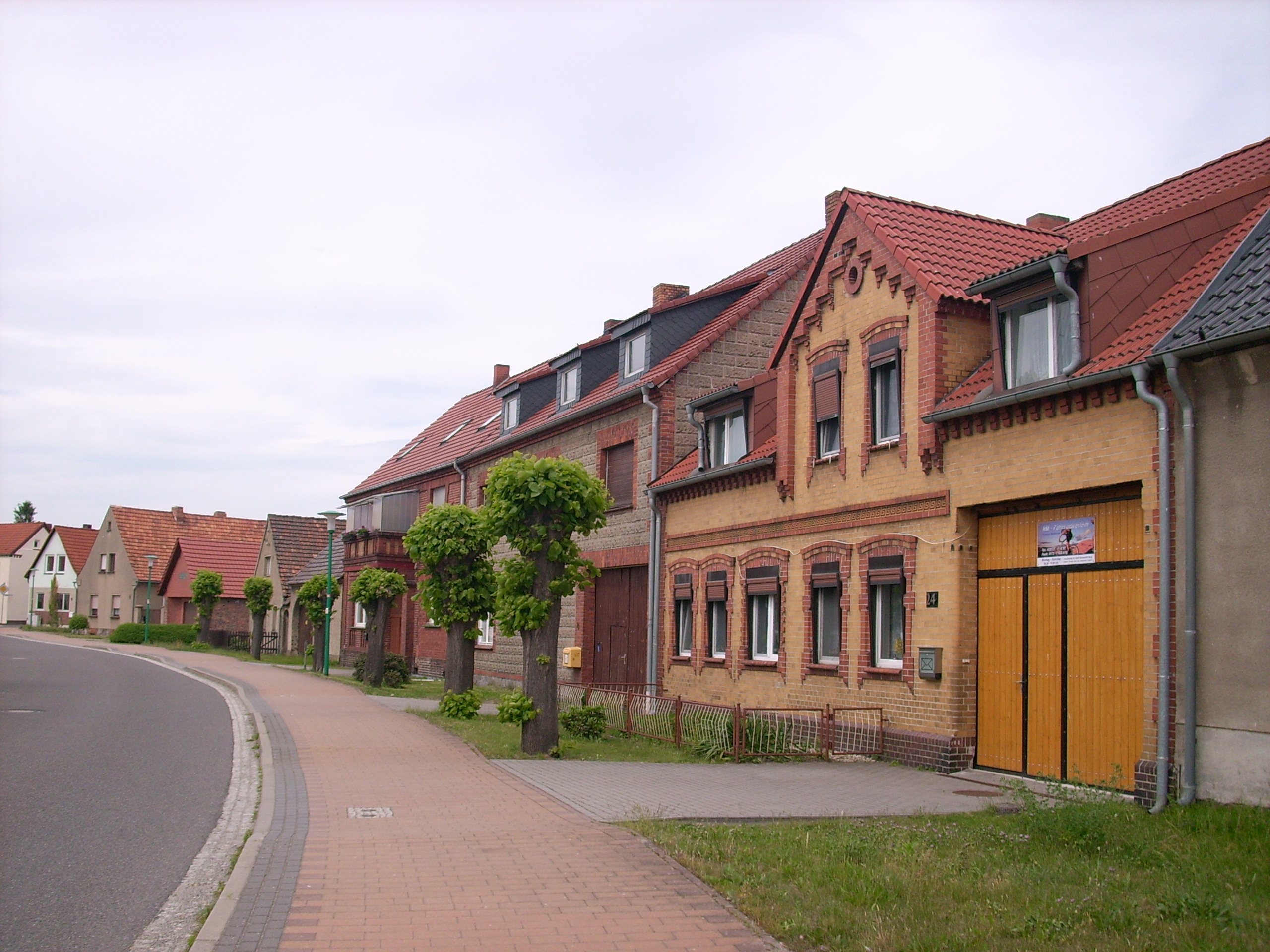
Street in Burg, district of Spreetal
