= Großnaundorf =

- Municipality
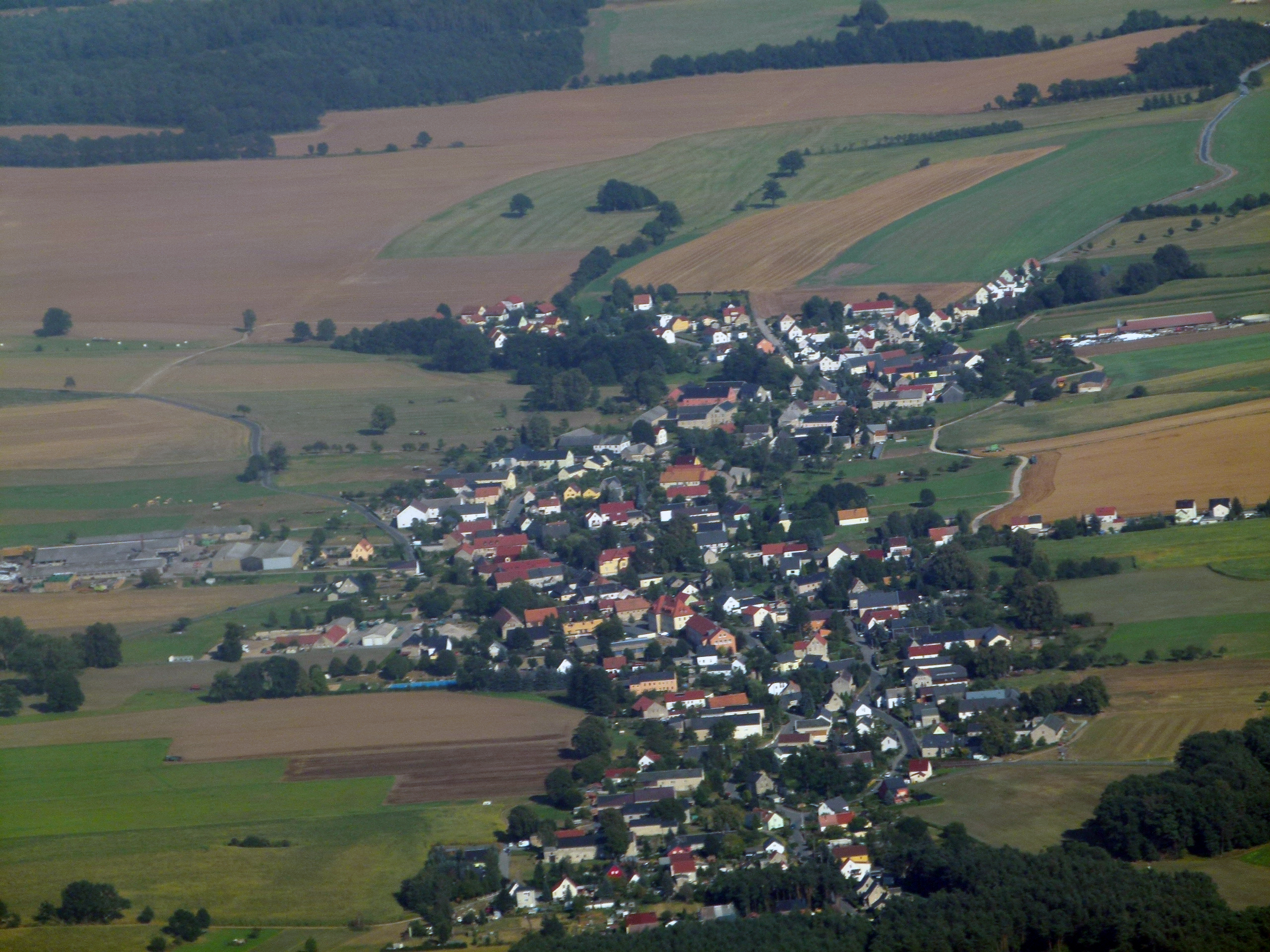

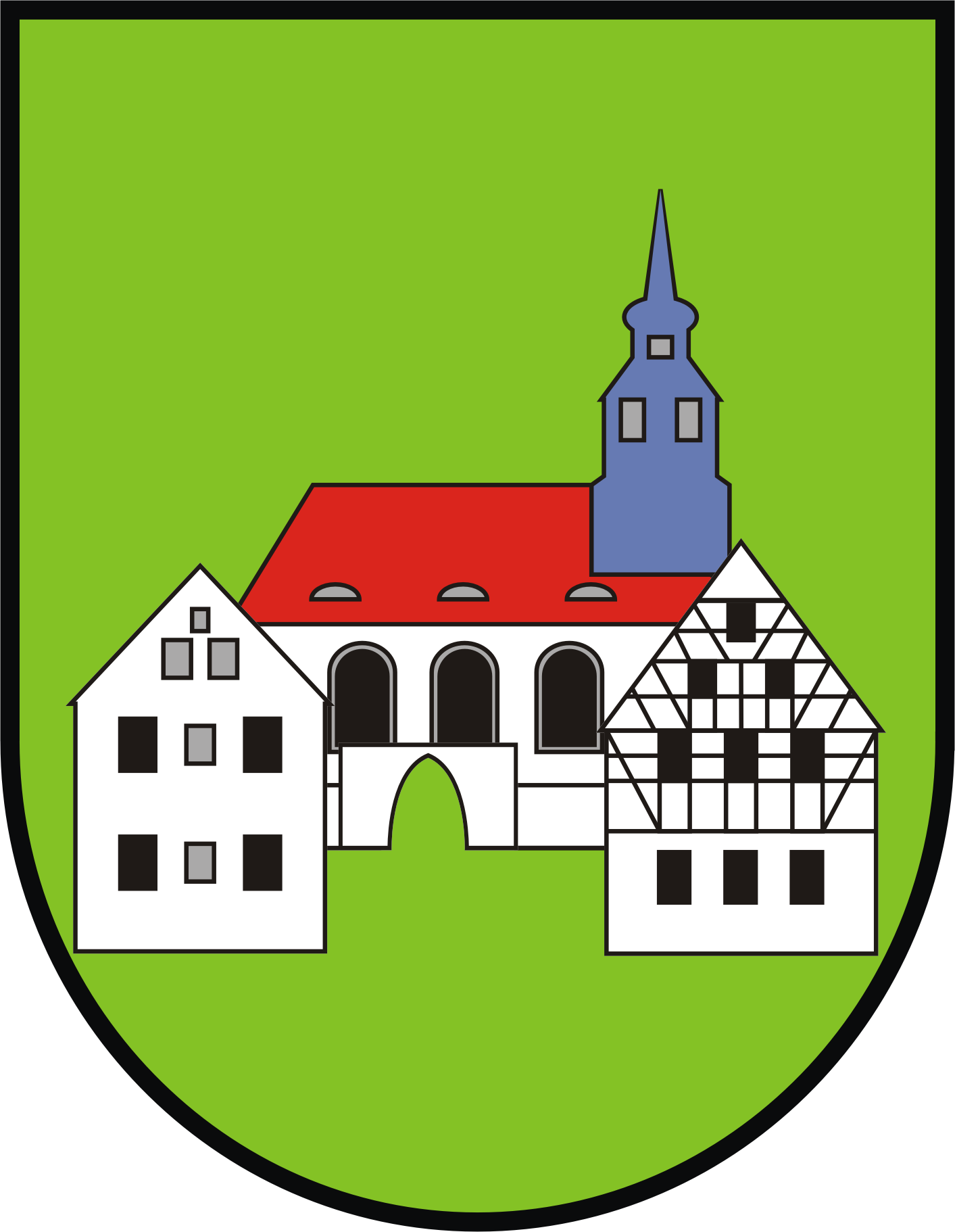
- Coat of arms

- Location of Großnaundorf within Bautzen district
- Interactive map of Großnaundorf
- Location within Germany Location within Saxony
- Coordinates: 51°12′N 13°56′E
- Country: Germany
- State: Saxony
- District: Bautzen

Government
  - Mayor (2017–24): Christian Rammer

Area
  - Total: 14.98 km^{2} (5.78 sq mi)
- Elevation: 253 m (830 ft)

Population (2025-12-31)
  - Total: 885
  - Density: 59.1/km^{2} (153/sq mi)
- Time zone: UTC+01:00 (CET)
  - Summer (DST): UTC+02:00 (CEST)
- Postal codes: 01936
- Dialling codes: 035955
- Vehicle registration: BZ, BIW, HY, KM

Großnaundorf (Upper Sorbian: Hłowna Njedźela) is a municipality in the district of Bautzen, in Saxony, Germany.
