= Schwepnitz =

- Municipality
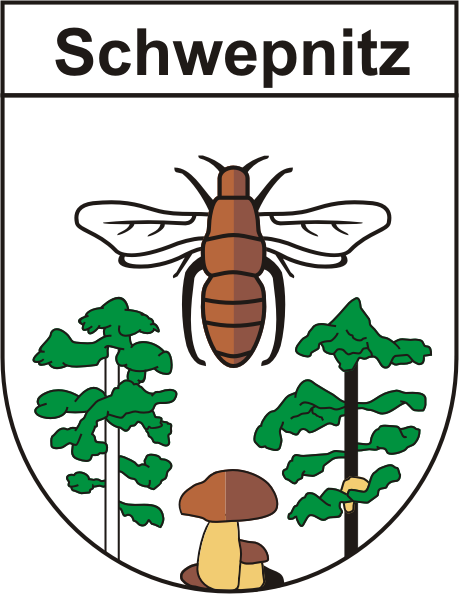
- Coat of arms

- Location of Schwepnitz within Bautzen district
- Interactive map of Schwepnitz
- Location within Germany Location within Saxony
- Coordinates: 51°19′47″N 13°57′37″E
- Country: Germany
- State: Saxony
- District: Bautzen
- Subdivisions: 5

Government
  - Mayor (2022–29): Elke Röthig (Ind.)

Area
  - Total: 55.50 km^{2} (21.43 sq mi)
- Elevation: 147 m (482 ft)

Population (2025-12-31)
  - Total: 2,381
  - Density: 42.90/km^{2} (111.1/sq mi)
- Time zone: UTC+01:00 (CET)
  - Summer (DST): UTC+02:00 (CEST)
- Postal codes: 01936
- Dialling codes: 035797
- Vehicle registration: BZ, BIW, HY, KM
- Website: www.schwepnitz.de

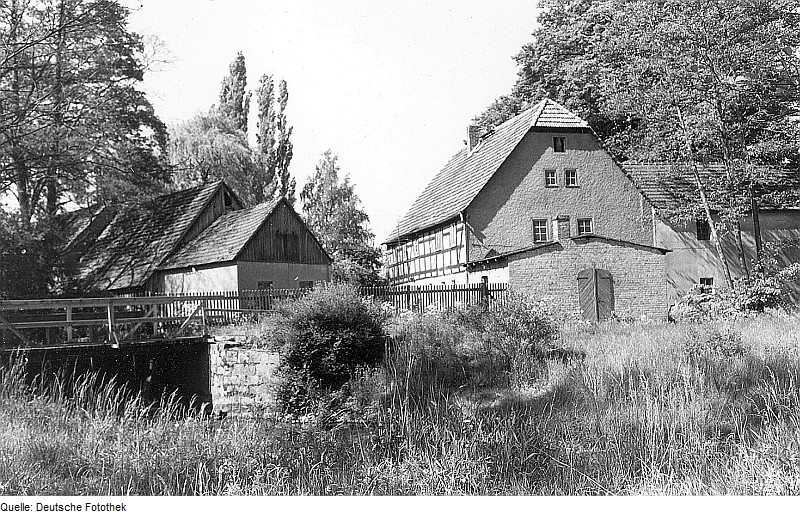
Bollbuck Mühle Cosel The Old Mill (1988)

Schwepnitz (German name; Upper Sorbian name: Sepicy pronounced [ˈsɛpʲitsɨ]) is a municipality in the district of Bautzen, in Saxony, Germany.
