= Elsterheide =

Elsterheide Halštrowska Hola
- Municipality
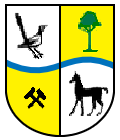
- Coat of arms

- Location of Elsterheide within Bautzen district
- Interactive map of Elsterheide
- Location within Germany Location within Saxony
- Coordinates: 51°30′N 14°10′E
- Country: Germany
- State: Saxony
- District: Bautzen
- Subdivisions: 8

Government
  - Mayor (2023–30): Antje Gasterstädt (CDU)

Area
  - Total: 126.85 km^{2} (48.98 sq mi)
- Elevation: 128 m (420 ft)

Population (2025-12-31)
  - Total: 3,241
  - Density: 25.55/km^{2} (66.17/sq mi)
- Time zone: UTC+01:00 (CET)
  - Summer (DST): UTC+02:00 (CEST)
- Postal codes: 02979
- Dialling codes: 03571, 03564
- Vehicle registration: BZ, BIW, HY, KM
- Website: www.elsterheide.de

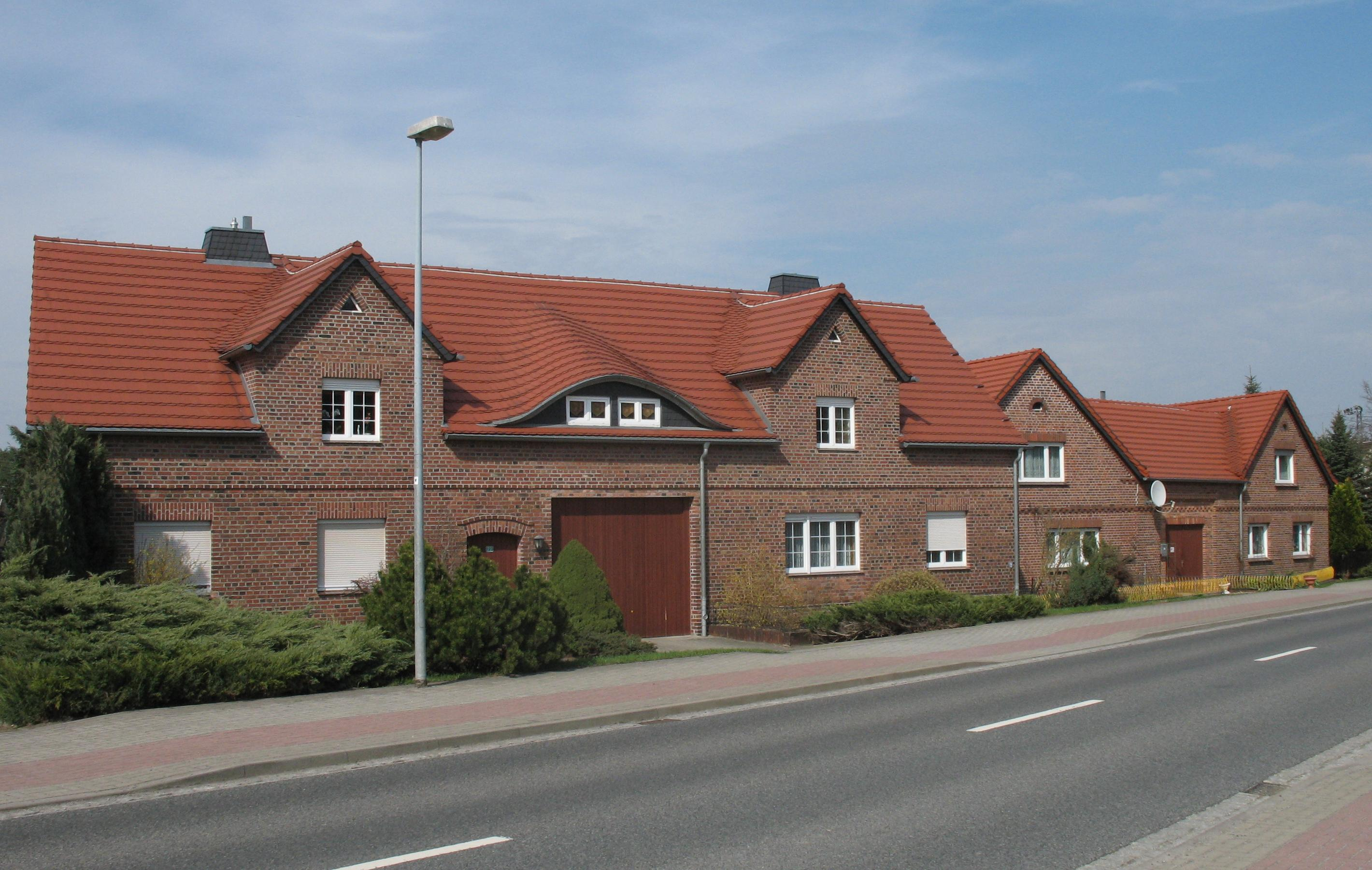
Nardt

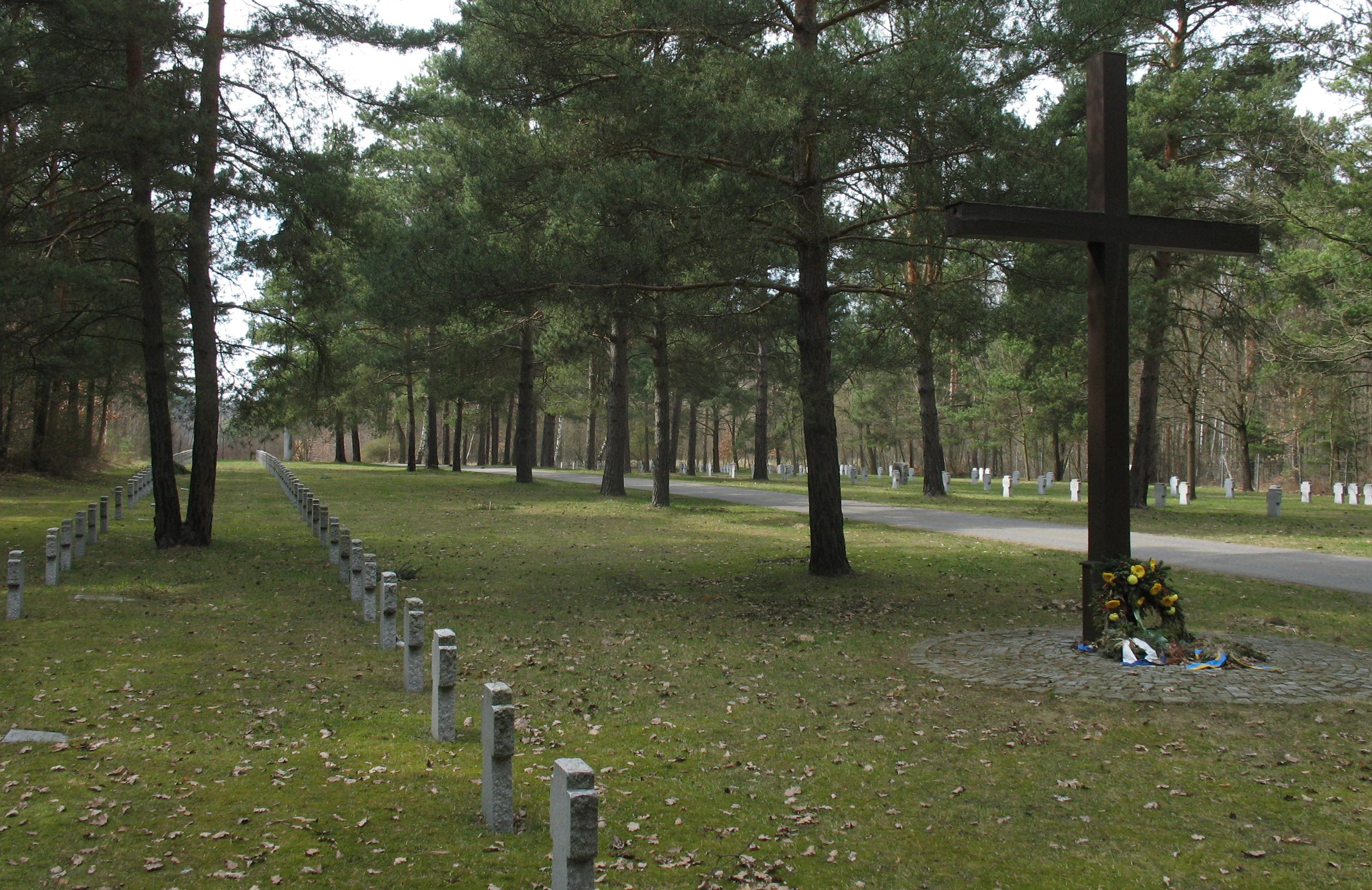
War graves in Nardt

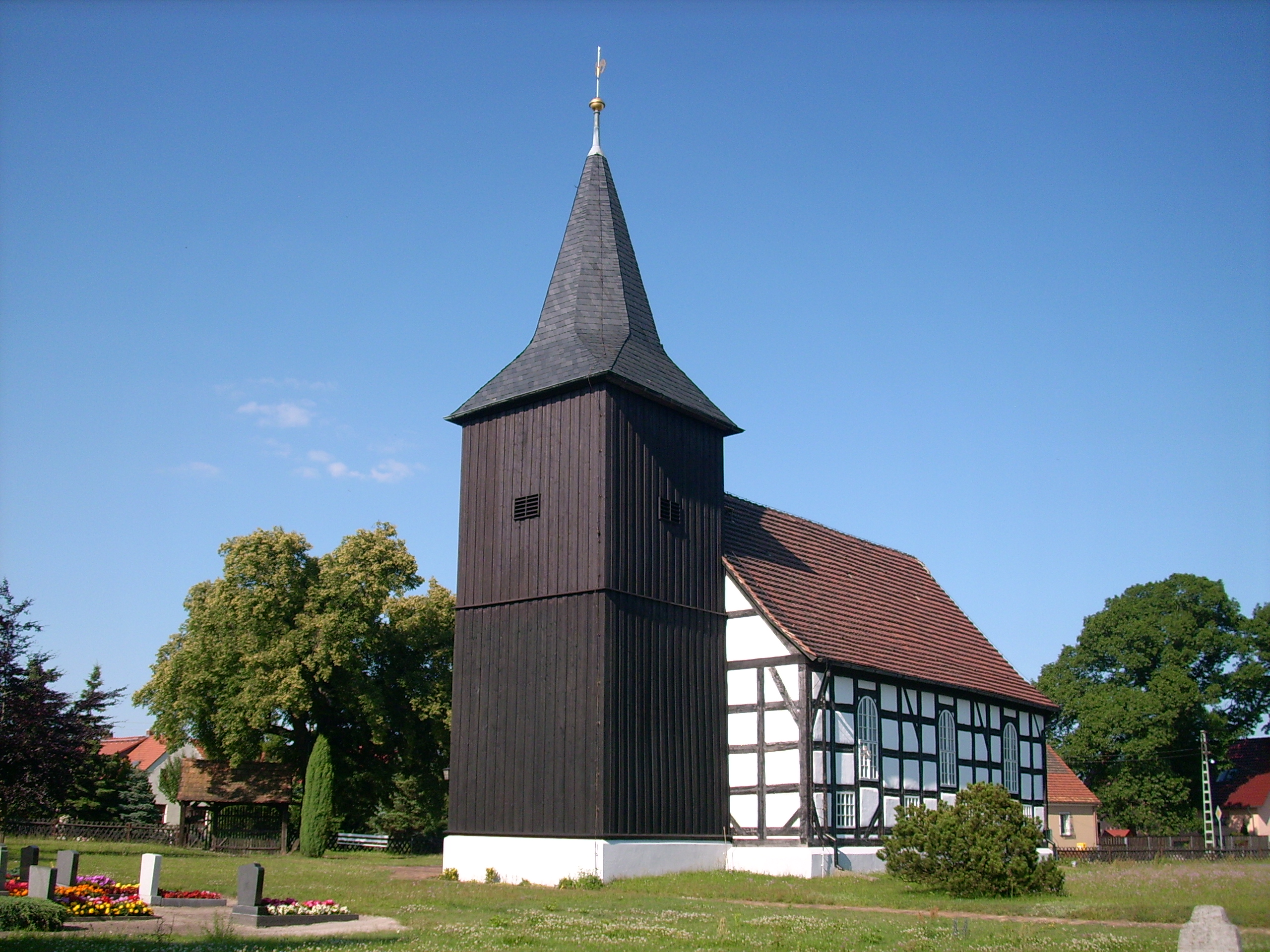
Church in Bluno

Elsterheide, in Sorbian Halštrowska hola (pronounced [ˈhalʃtʁɔfska ˈhɔla]), is a municipality in the district of Bautzen, in Saxony, Germany.

The municipality is part of the recognized Sorbian settlement area in Saxony. Upper Sorbian has an official status next to German.

== History ==
The municipality of Elsterheide was formed in 1995 by merging the former municipalities of Neuwiese, Sabrodt, Nardt, Klein Partwitz, Seidewinkel, Tätzschwitz, Bluno and Geierswalde. Within Prussian Silesia (Province of Silesia 1815–1919 and 1938–41, Province of Lower Silesia 1919–38 and 1941–45), all of these municipalities were part of Landkreis Hoyerswerda. Within the East German Bezirk Cottbus, they were part of Kreis Hoyerswerda. With German unification in 1990, they became part of Saxony.
