= Ohorn =

- Municipality
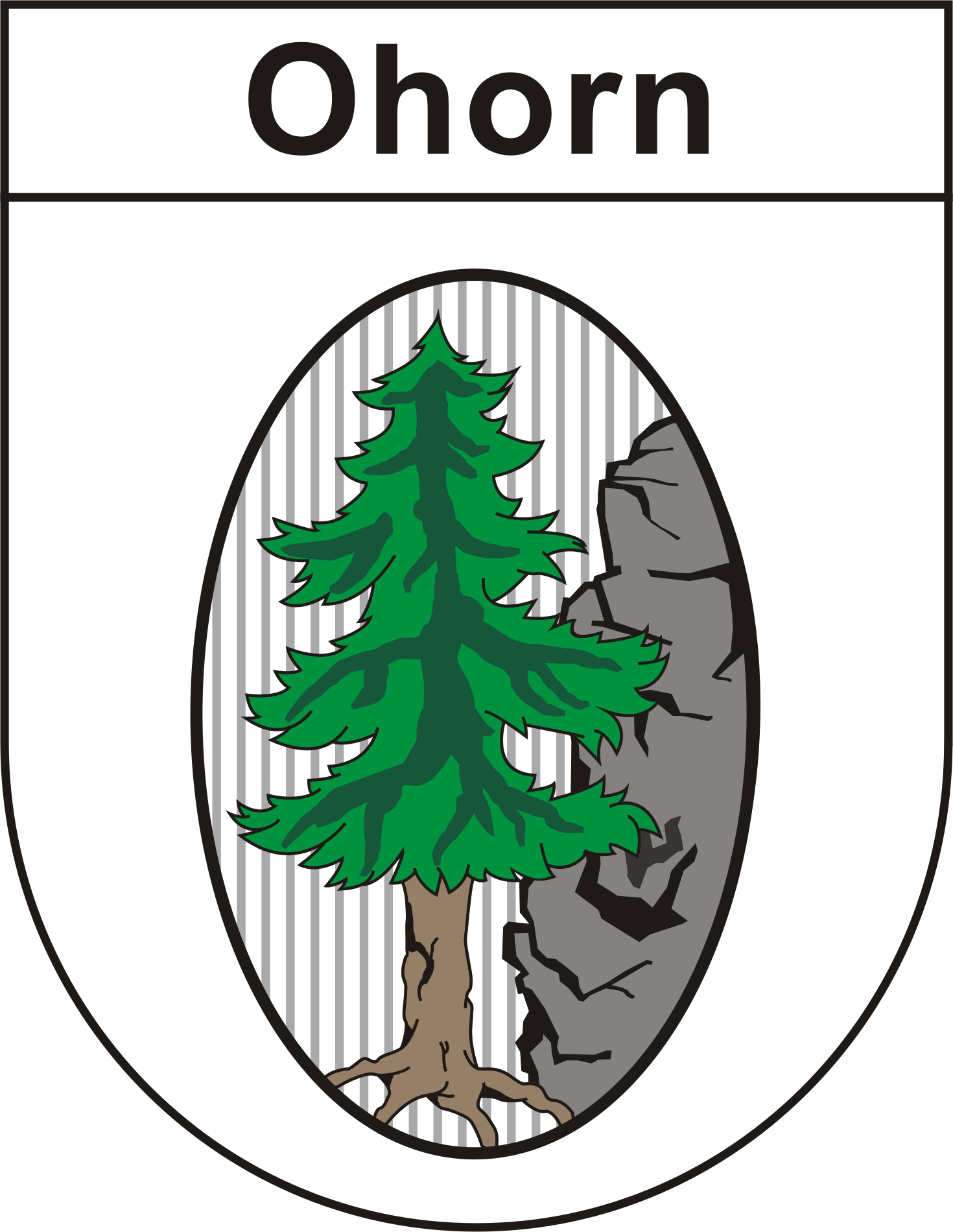
- Coat of arms

- Location of Ohorn within Bautzen district
- Interactive map of Ohorn
- Location within Germany Location within Saxony
- Coordinates: 51°10′30″N 14°3′2″E
- Country: Germany
- State: Saxony
- District: Bautzen
- Subdivisions: 5

Government
  - Mayor (2020–27): Sonja Kunze

Area
  - Total: 12.07 km^{2} (4.66 sq mi)
- Elevation: 366 m (1,201 ft)

Population (2025-12-31)
  - Total: 2,433
  - Density: 201.6/km^{2} (522.1/sq mi)
- Time zone: UTC+01:00 (CET)
  - Summer (DST): UTC+02:00 (CEST)
- Postal codes: 01896
- Dialling codes: 035955
- Vehicle registration: BZ, BIW, HY, KM
- Website: www.ohorn-sachsen.de

Ohorn is a municipality in the district of Bautzen, in Saxony, Germany. Ohorn is a governmentally accredited recreation locality.

== Geography and infrastructure ==
The municipality is located 2 km east of Pulsnitz and 30 km to the northeast of Dresden, the capital of Saxony. Embedded in the valley of the River Pulsnitz, Ohorn is surrounded by the typical landscape of the western Lusatian Hills, reaching a height of 449 m at the Hochstein Hill. Ohorn, having its own exit can be reached by using the A4 federal autobahn.

== Local subdivision ==
Ohorn is divided into 5 parts: Fuchsbelle, Gickelsberg, Mitteldorf, Oberdorf and Röder.

== Historical development ==
Following German Teutonic knights' call, in 1110 craftsmen, manufacturers and farmers from Thuringia, Franconia, Hesse and Bavaria came to settle in the area of the river Pulsnitz valley, creating a settlement of approximately 20 hectares (49 acres) on the southwestern side of the Schleißberg Hill, the river being an important factor in the location of the settlement.

Ohorn was first mentioned in historical documents in 1349 in the Book of Feuds owned by Frederick III, Landgrave of Thuringia, bearing the name "Ahorn", which stands for "Settlement by the maple tree/wood" In 1537, Ohorn Manor was mentioned as an estate of the rule of Pulsnitz. Today, only parts of the country house, now giving space to a residential care home, and several buildings converted into housing establishments remain as well as the English style park. In those times, there were no important steps of development in Ohorn, its status as a farmer's settlement persisted because the state borders of the Diocese of Meißen and the Bohemian Kingdom took course through the settlement, exposing it to recurrent raids and warfare throughout the centuries. In addition, the number of inhabitants was decimated by epidemics; the plague resulted in the death of a fifth of the population.

In 1661, the ruling Knights of the Ohorn Manor approved the construction of a school building. The first school building to be recorded was established in 1750. Beginning in 1745, a drastic social change took place, since Michael Prescher introduced a ribbon weaving mill. Due to its development into an industrially shaped locality, Ohorn's demographics evolved accordingly: in 1885, there were 2000 people living in the settlement.

With increasing numbers of cottage weavers, better looms were required, leading to the establishment of the loom manufacturing business C.H. Schäfer, which now produces machine parts and is one of Ohorn's largest employers.

In 1827 and 1879, new school buildings were established. The first bus connection to the surrounding areas was established in 1912 by the smith Bernhard Mocke's postal stage bus, being the first one in Saxony, connecting the two cities of Pulsnitz and Königsbrück.

The Upper Guesthouse of Ohorn was reestablished as the city hall in 1925. Five years later, the former manor's steam mill was converted into the Betsaal, a hall. The Gymnastics Club of Ohorn has existed since 1865. The same year, a choir was established, but no longer exists. Thirty years later, the Compulsory Fire Brigade was converted into an auxiliary fire brigade.

In 1939, Ohorn was connected to the planned freeway between Dresden and Wrocław, which is the reason for its connection to the federal freeway 4.

== Landmarks and places of interest ==
- Schleißberg- Hill with Schleißbergbaude
- Schwedenstein with look- out and montane restaurant
- Tanneberg- Hill look- out with hut
- Museum of Local History
- Buschmühlenteich (lake with gondolas available)
- Llama farm Winter
- Kirchlehn

== Economy ==
In Ohorn, two active farmers and a farmer's cooperative can be found today. There is only a limited number of weaving mills left.
