= Frankenthal, Saxony =

Frankenthal
- Municipality
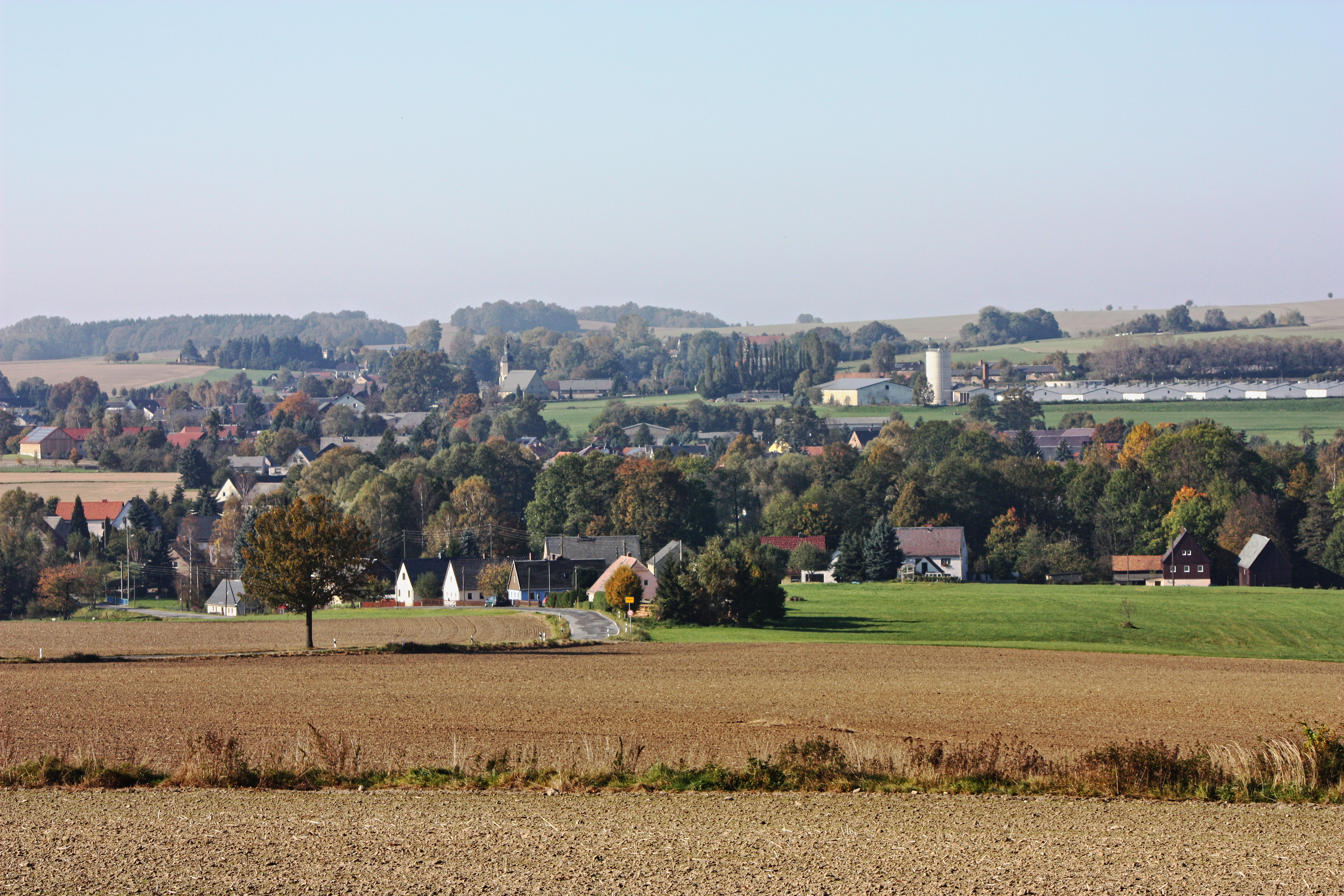
- View of Frankenthal

- Location of Frankenthal within Bautzen district
- Interactive map of Frankenthal
- Location within Germany Location within Saxony
- Coordinates: 51°8′N 14°7′E
- Country: Germany
- State: Saxony
- District: Bautzen

Government
  - Mayor (2017–24): Janine Bansner (CDU)

Area
  - Total: 9.43 km^{2} (3.64 sq mi)
- Elevation: 285 m (935 ft)

Population (2025-12-31)
  - Total: 898
  - Density: 95.2/km^{2} (247/sq mi)
- Time zone: UTC+01:00 (CET)
  - Summer (DST): UTC+02:00 (CEST)
- Postal codes: 01909
- Dialling codes: 035954
- Vehicle registration: BZ, BIW, HY, KM
- Website: www.gemeinde-frankenthal.de

Frankenthal (German pronunciation: [ˈfʁaŋkn̩taːl]; Upper Sorbian: Frankln) is a municipality in eastern Saxony, Germany. It belongs to the district of Bautzen and lies west of the eponymous city. It is named after Frankish colonists who settled in Lusatia ca. 1200.

Frankenthal is situated at the northern edge of the Lausitzer Bergland (Lusatian Hills), near the city of Bischofswerda.

== Sources ==
- Schumann, August (1815). "Frankenthal". Vollständiges Staats-, Post- und Zeitungslexikon von Sachsen (in German). Vol. 2. Zwickau. p. 692.
- Schumann, August (1828). "Frankenthal". Vollständiges Staats-, Post- und Zeitungslexikon von Sachsen (in German). Vol. 15. Zwickau. p. 824.
