= Lichtenberg (Lausitz) =

- Municipality
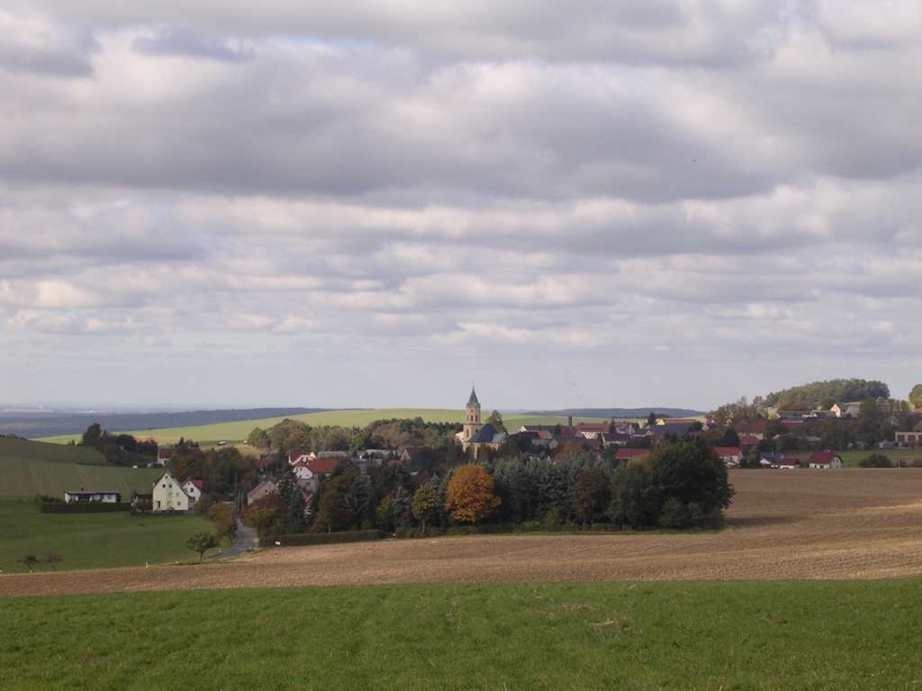

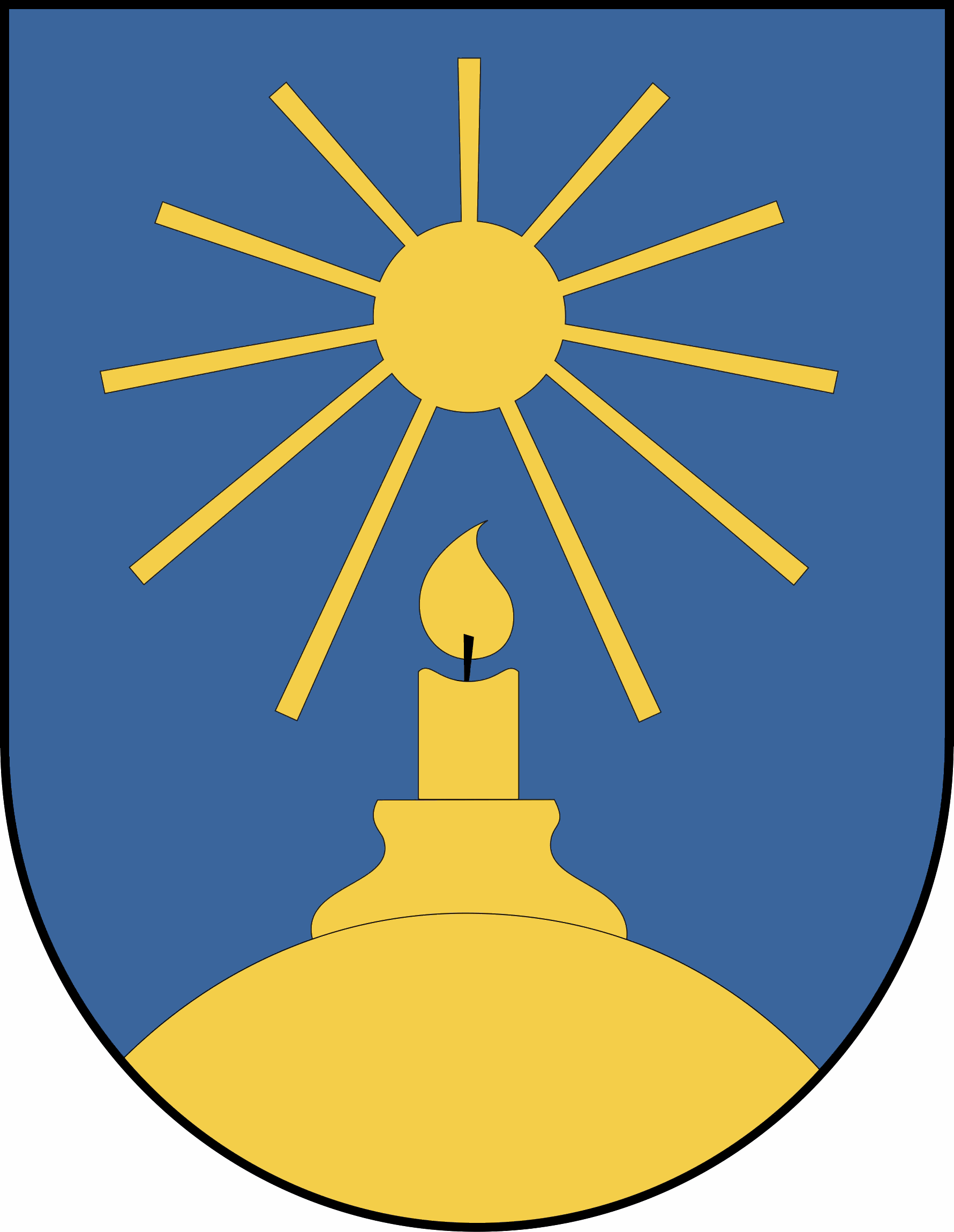
- Coat of arms

- Location of Lichtenberg within Bautzen district
- Interactive map of Lichtenberg
- Location within Germany Location within Saxony
- Coordinates: 51°11′N 13°58′E
- Country: Germany
- State: Saxony
- District: Bautzen
- Subdivisions: 2

Government
  - Mayor (2022–29): Thomas Wuttke

Area
  - Total: 14.72 km^{2} (5.68 sq mi)
- Elevation: 326 m (1,070 ft)

Population (2025-12-31)
  - Total: 1,590
  - Density: 108/km^{2} (280/sq mi)
- Time zone: UTC+01:00 (CET)
  - Summer (DST): UTC+02:00 (CEST)
- Postal codes: 01896
- Dialling codes: 035955
- Vehicle registration: BZ, BIW, HY, KM

Lichtenberg (German pronunciation: [ˈlɪçtn̩bɛʁk]) is a municipality in the district of Bautzen, in Saxony, Germany.
