= Haselbachtal =

- Municipality
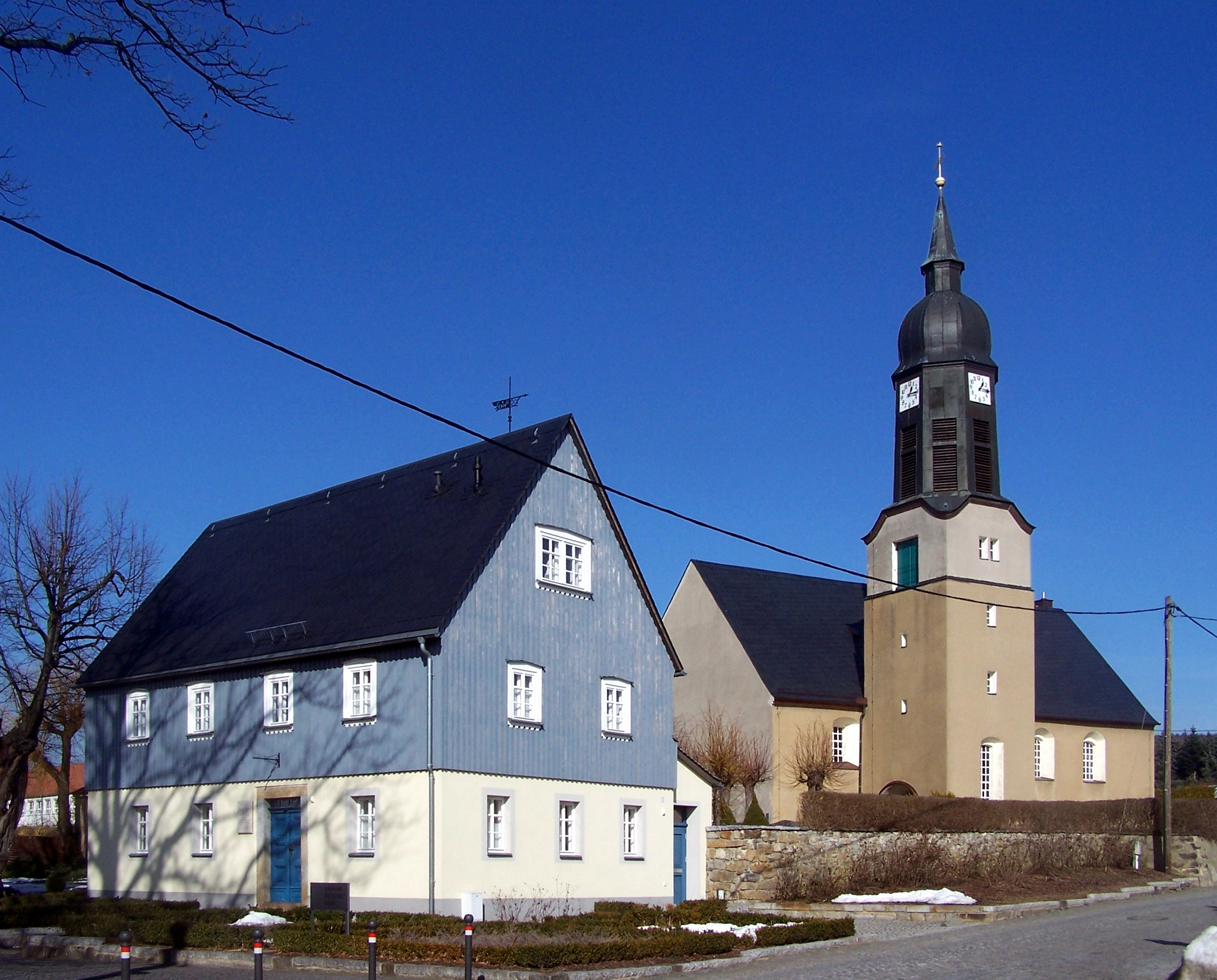

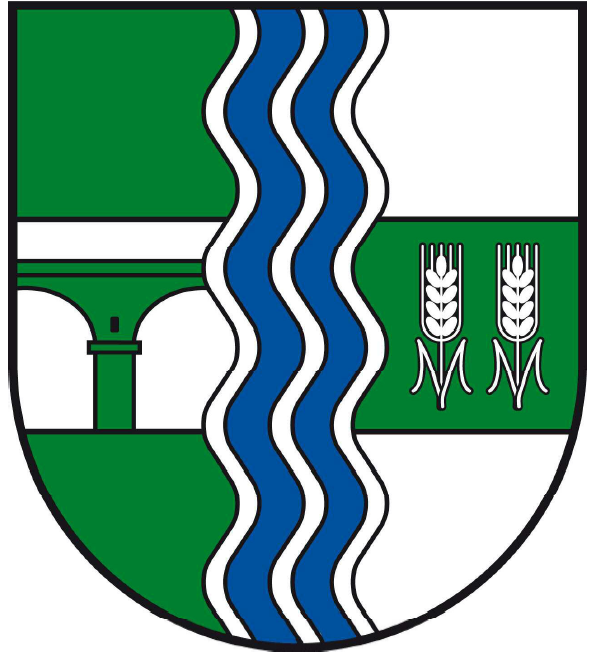
- Coat of arms

- Location of Haselbachtal within Bautzen district
- Interactive map of Haselbachtal
- Location within Germany Location within Saxony
- Coordinates: 51°14′48″N 14°0′42″E
- Country: Germany
- State: Saxony
- District: Bautzen
- Subdivisions: 6

Government
  - Mayor (2022–29): Tobias Liebschner

Area
  - Total: 37.47 km^{2} (14.47 sq mi)
- Elevation: 234 m (768 ft)

Population (2025-12-31)
  - Total: 3,809
  - Density: 101.7/km^{2} (263.3/sq mi)
- Time zone: UTC+01:00 (CET)
  - Summer (DST): UTC+02:00 (CEST)
- Postal codes: 01920
- Dialling codes: 03578
- Vehicle registration: BZ, BIW, HY, KM
- Website: www.haselbachtal.de

Haselbachtal is a municipality in the district of Bautzen in Saxony, Germany with a population of 3,997 (2020). It consists of the villages Bischheim, Häslich, Gersdorf, Möhrsdorf, Reichenau, and Reichenbach.

== Geography and transportation ==
Haselbachtal lies about 7 km south-west of the city of Kamenz and about 35 km north-east of Dresden. The Bundesautobahn 4 passes south of the municipality and can be reached over Pulsnitz, which is about 10 km away. The river Pulsnitz flows through Haselbachtal.

== History ==
Reichenbach was first mentioned in 1248. The town emerged during the German East Colonisation. During the Thirty Years' War 248 people, which made up most of the population of the village at the time, died of the pestilence.

The borough of Reichenau was first mentioned in 1436, but is probably much older. In the years from 1429 to 1431, Hussites pillaged the village and destroyed the church. During the Liberation Wars, first Prussian, then Russian troops were stationed in Reichenau.

The boroughs of Gersdorf and Möhrsdorf were first mentioned in 1225 and 1264, respectively. They belong together since 14 February 1958.

Bischheim was first mentioned in 1225 and was merged with Häslich on 1 January 1969.

On 1 January 2001 the towns of Reichenbach, Reichenau, Gersdorf-Möhrsdorf und Bischheim-Häslich were incorporated into the municipality of Haselbachtal.

== Attractions ==
- Park in Bischheim
- Museum of granite excavation
- Church in Reichenbach
- Church and town square in Gersdorf
