= Oßling =

Oßling/Wóslink
- Municipality
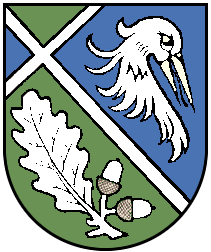
- Coat of arms

- Location of Oßling/Wóslink within Bautzen district
- Interactive map of Oßling/Wóslink
- Location within Germany Location within Saxony
- Coordinates: 51°22′N 14°10′E
- Country: Germany
- State: Saxony
- District: Bautzen
- Subdivisions: 9

Government
  - Mayor (2020–27): Johannes Nitzsche

Area
  - Total: 43.58 km^{2} (16.83 sq mi)
- Elevation: 126 m (413 ft)

Population (2025-12-31)
  - Total: 2,187
  - Density: 50.18/km^{2} (130.0/sq mi)
- Time zone: UTC+01:00 (CET)
  - Summer (DST): UTC+02:00 (CEST)
- Postal codes: 01920
- Dialling codes: 035792
- Vehicle registration: BZ, BIW, HY, KM
- Website: www.ossling.de

Oßling (German) or Wóslink (Upper Sorbian, pronounced [ˈwʊslʲiŋk]) is a municipality in the district of Bautzen, in Saxony, Germany.

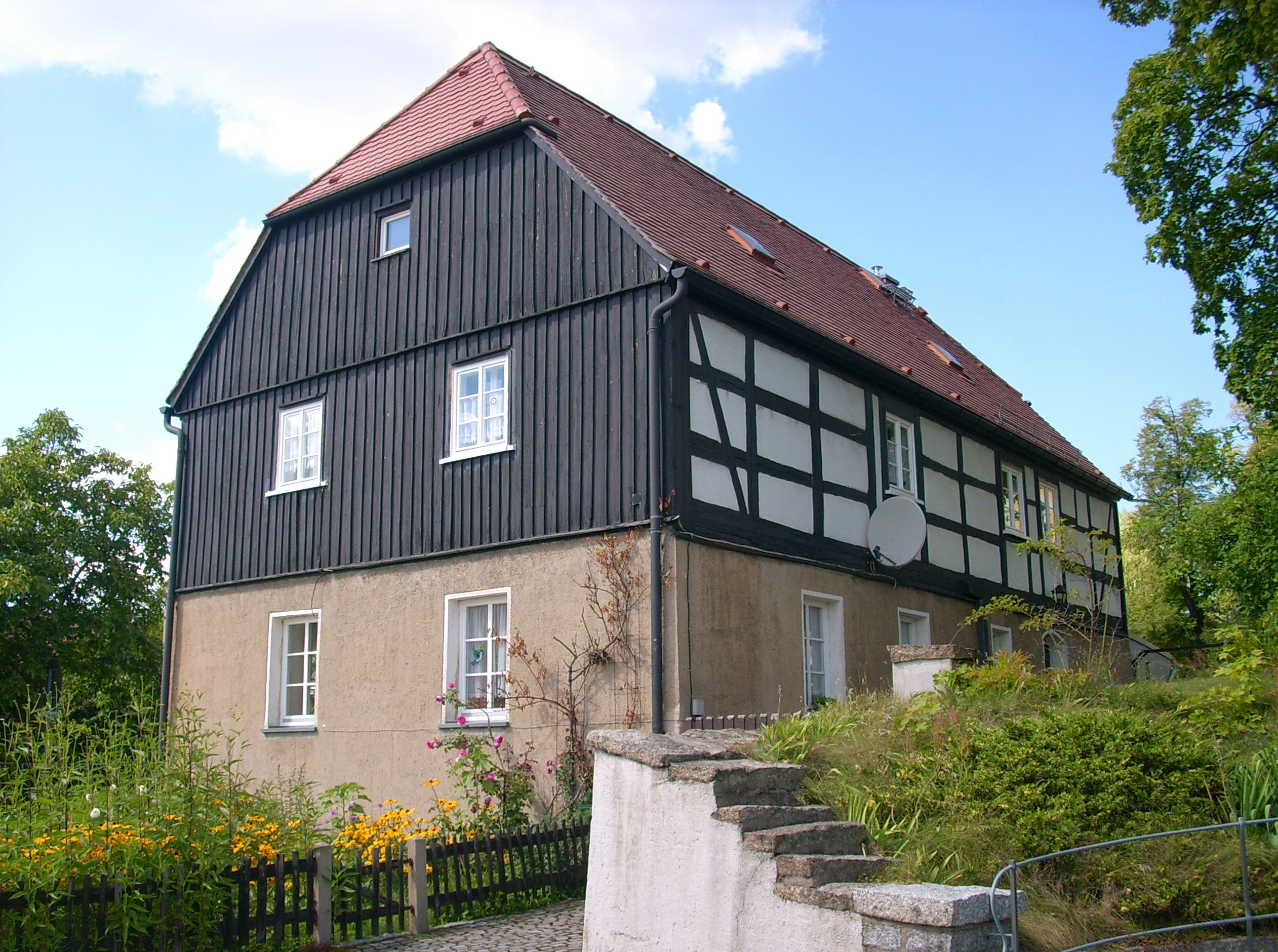
Half-timbered house in Oßling

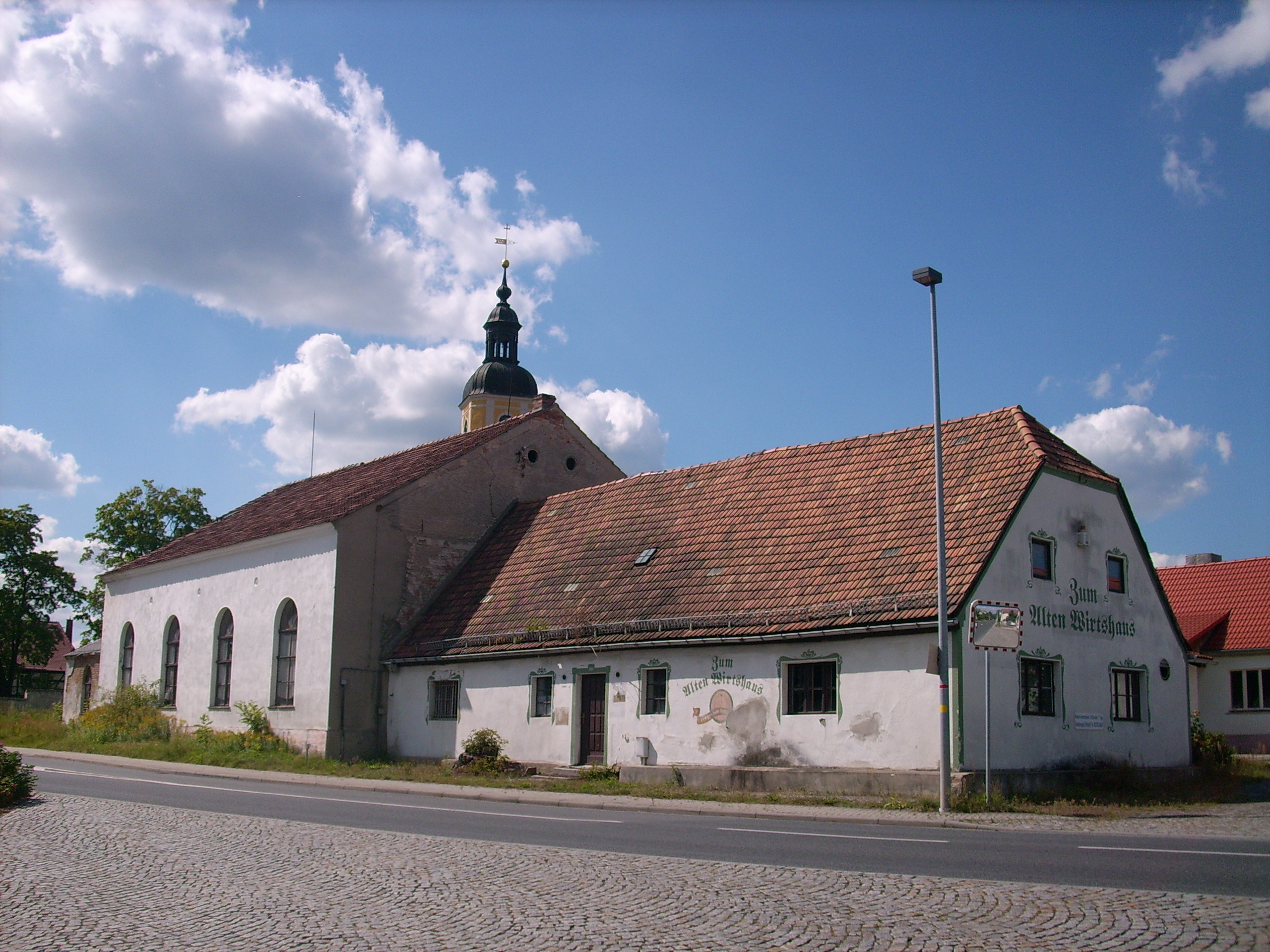
Old tavern in Oßling

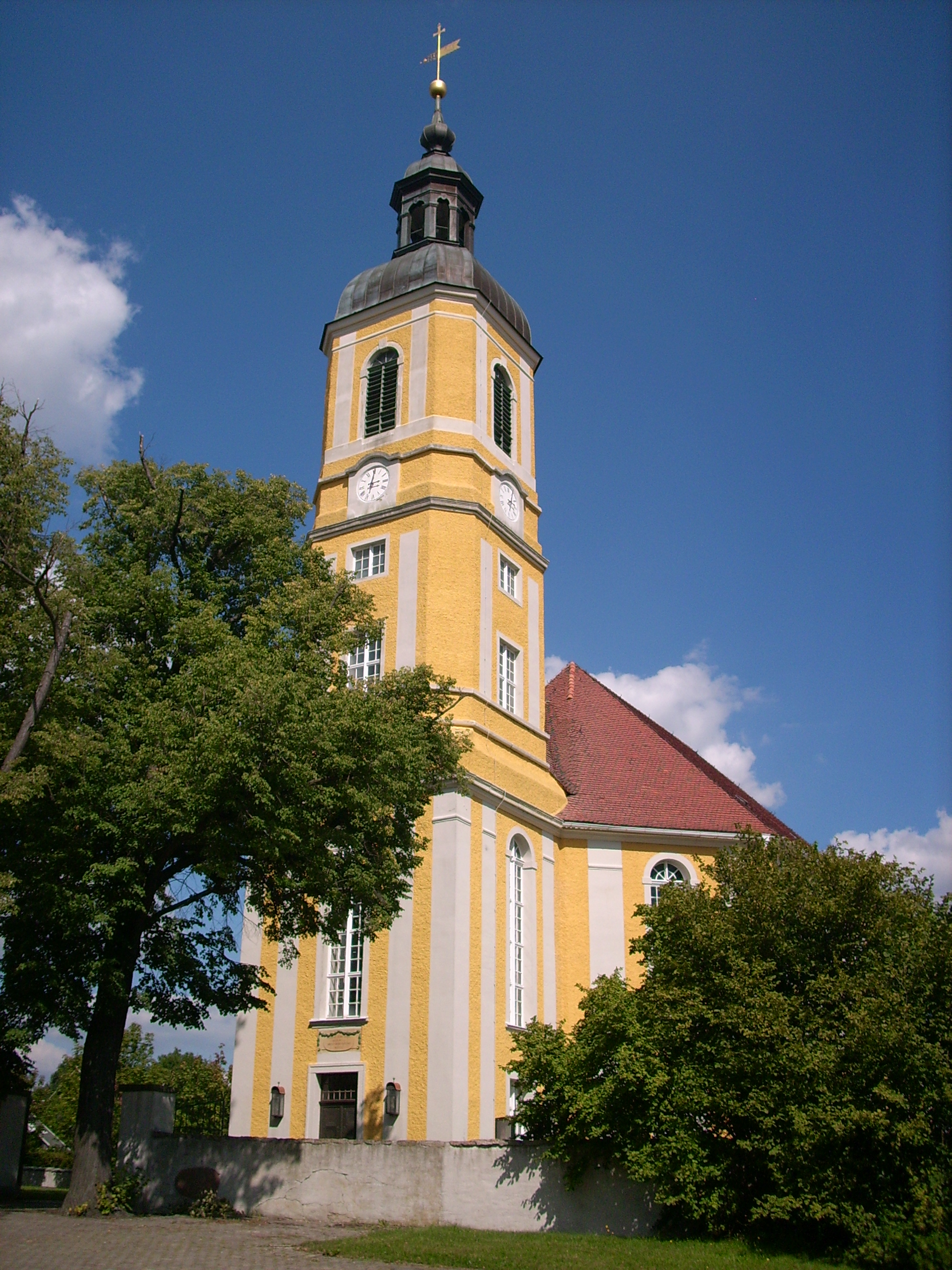
Church in Oßling

== See also ==
- Dubringer Moor, a local nature reserve.
