= Lauta =

Lauta/Łuty
- Town
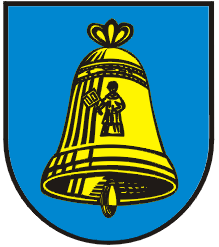
- Coat of arms

- Location of Lauta/Łuty within Bautzen district
- Interactive map of Lauta/Łuty
- Location within Germany Location within Saxony
- Coordinates: 51°26′53″N 14°5′59″E
- Country: Germany
- State: Saxony
- District: Bautzen
- Subdivisions: 3

Government
  - Mayor (2022–29): Frank Lehmann

Area
  - Total: 42.13 km^{2} (16.27 sq mi)
- Elevation: 123 m (404 ft)

Population (2025-12-31)
  - Total: 7,681
  - Density: 182.3/km^{2} (472.2/sq mi)
- Time zone: UTC+01:00 (CET)
  - Summer (DST): UTC+02:00 (CEST)
- Postal codes: 02991
- Dialling codes: 035722
- Vehicle registration: BZ, BIW, HY, KM
- Website: www.lauta.de

Lauta (German, pronounced [ˈlaʊta]) or Łuty (Upper Sorbian, pronounced [ˈwutɨ]) is a town in the district of Bautzen, in Saxony, Germany. It is situated in Lower Lusatia, 10 km west of Hoyerswerda, and 10 km southeast of Senftenberg.

== History ==
From 1815 to 1945, within the Prussian Province of Brandenburg, Lauta was part of Landkreis Calau. From 1945 to 1952, it was part of Brandenburg. From 1952 to 1990, within the East German Bezirk Cottbus, it was part of Kreis Hoyerswerda. With German reunification in 1990, it became part of Saxony.

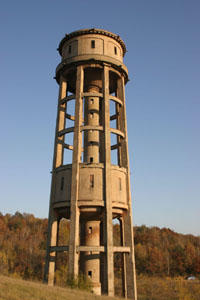
Watertower

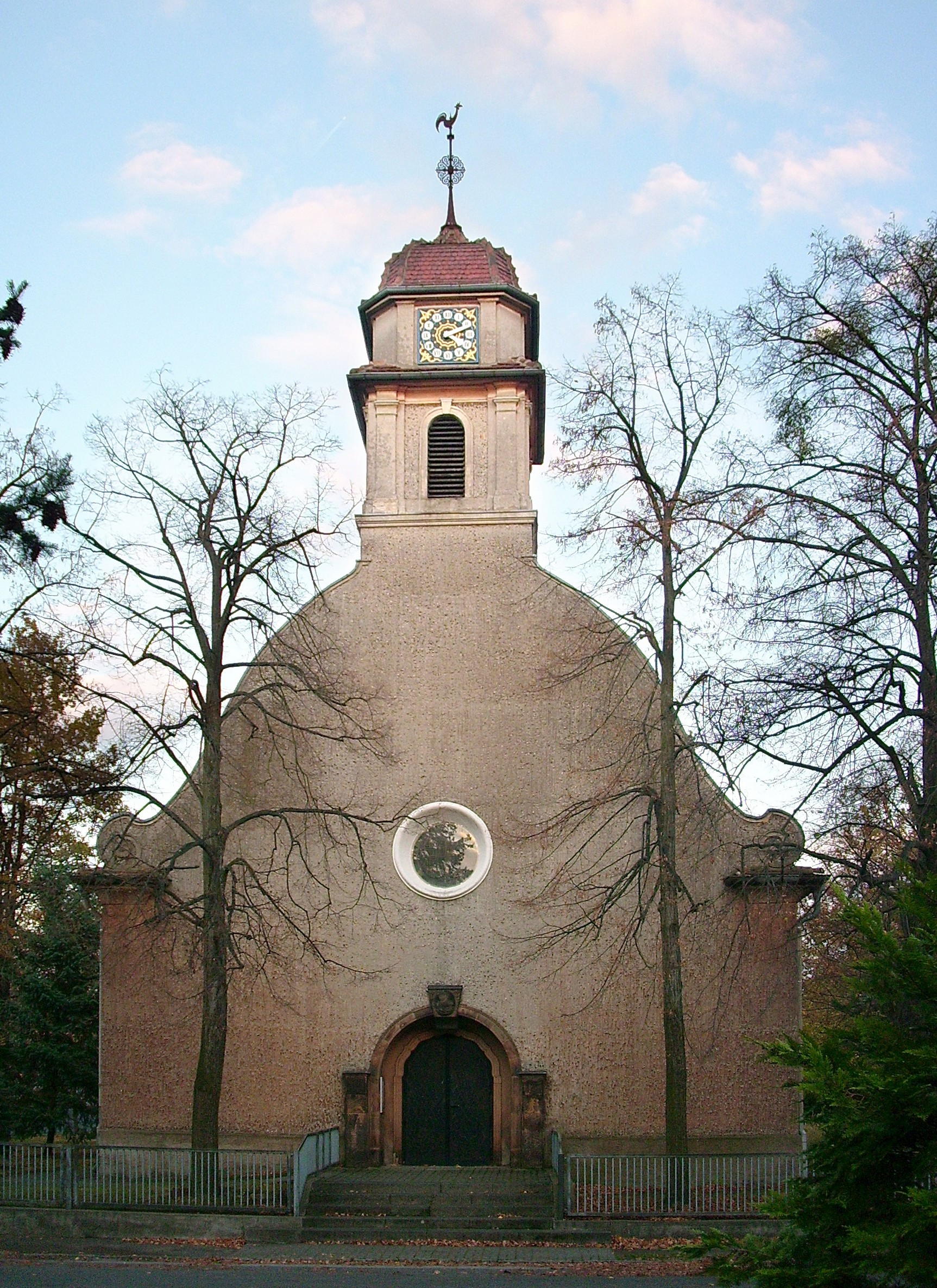
Catholic church

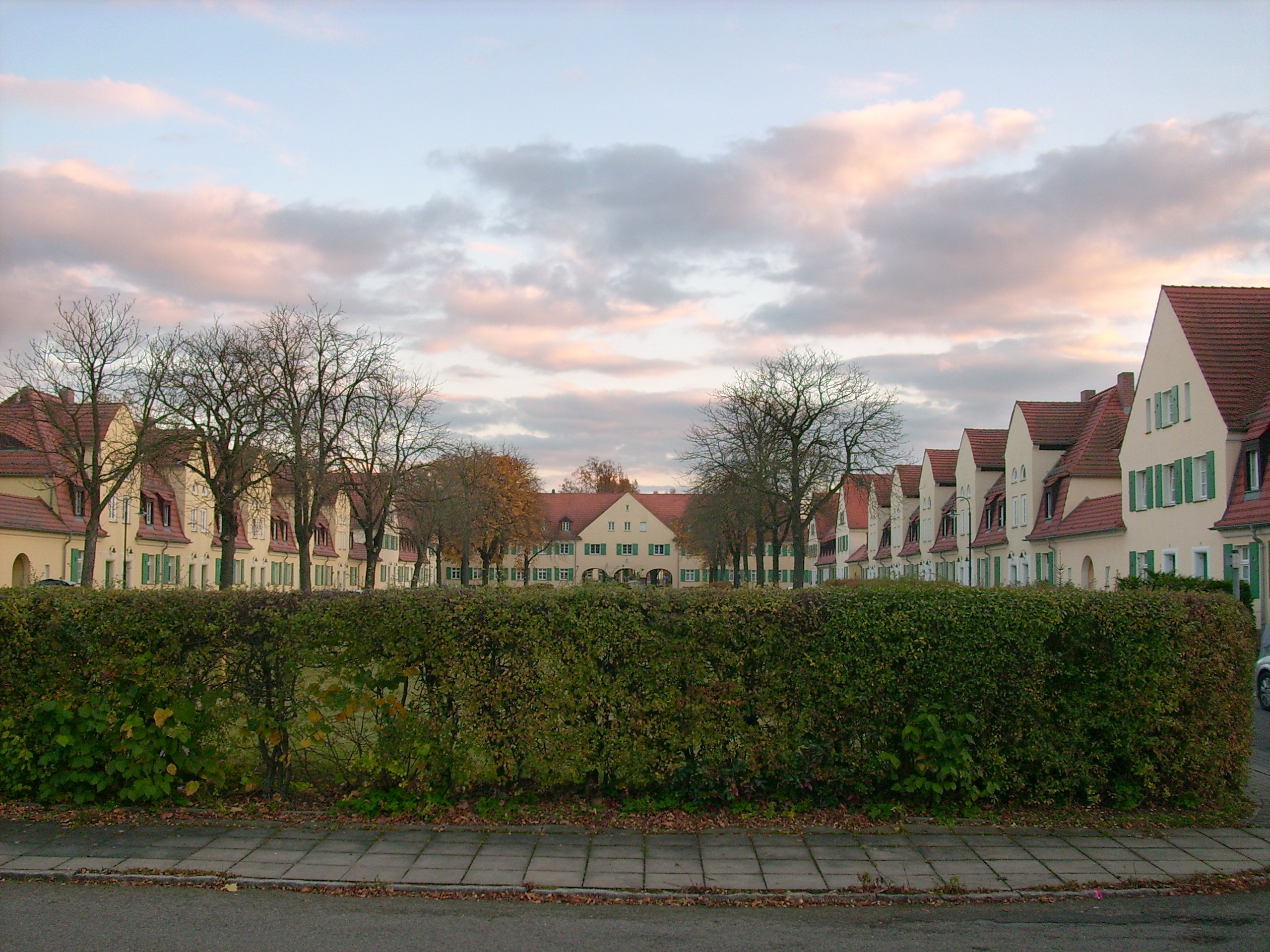
Housing complex

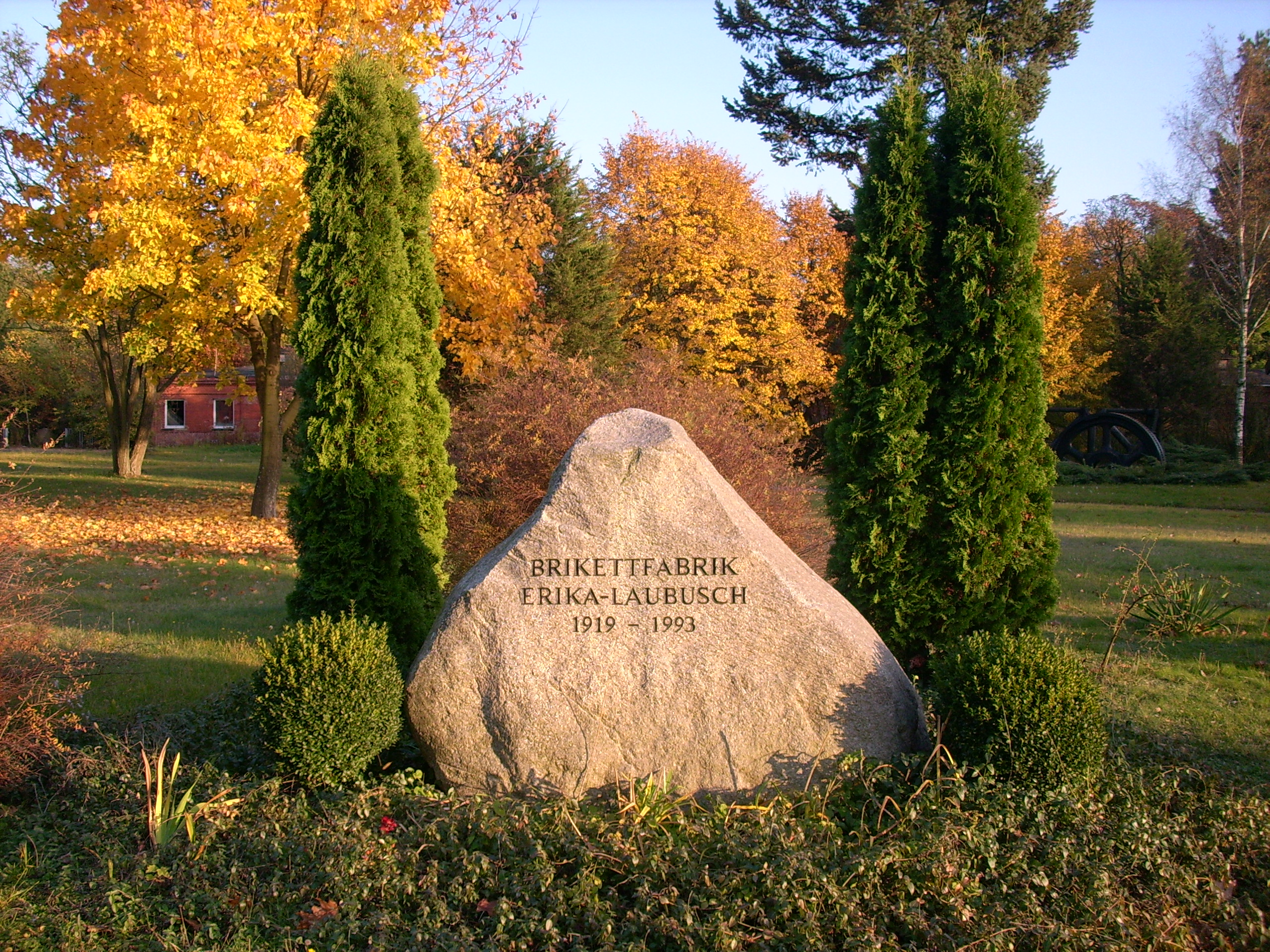
Monument in Laubusch, district of Lauta

== Personality ==
=== Personalities who worked in Lauta ===
- Albert Zimmermann, resistance fighter, executed on 27 November 1944

=== Personalities who lived temporarily in Lauta ===
- Peter Mädler, (1943–1963), death at the Berlin Wall (1963), 1958–1961 electrician apprentice in the power plant Lauta.
- Joachim Hansen, (1930–2007), actor
