= Großröhrsdorf =

- Town
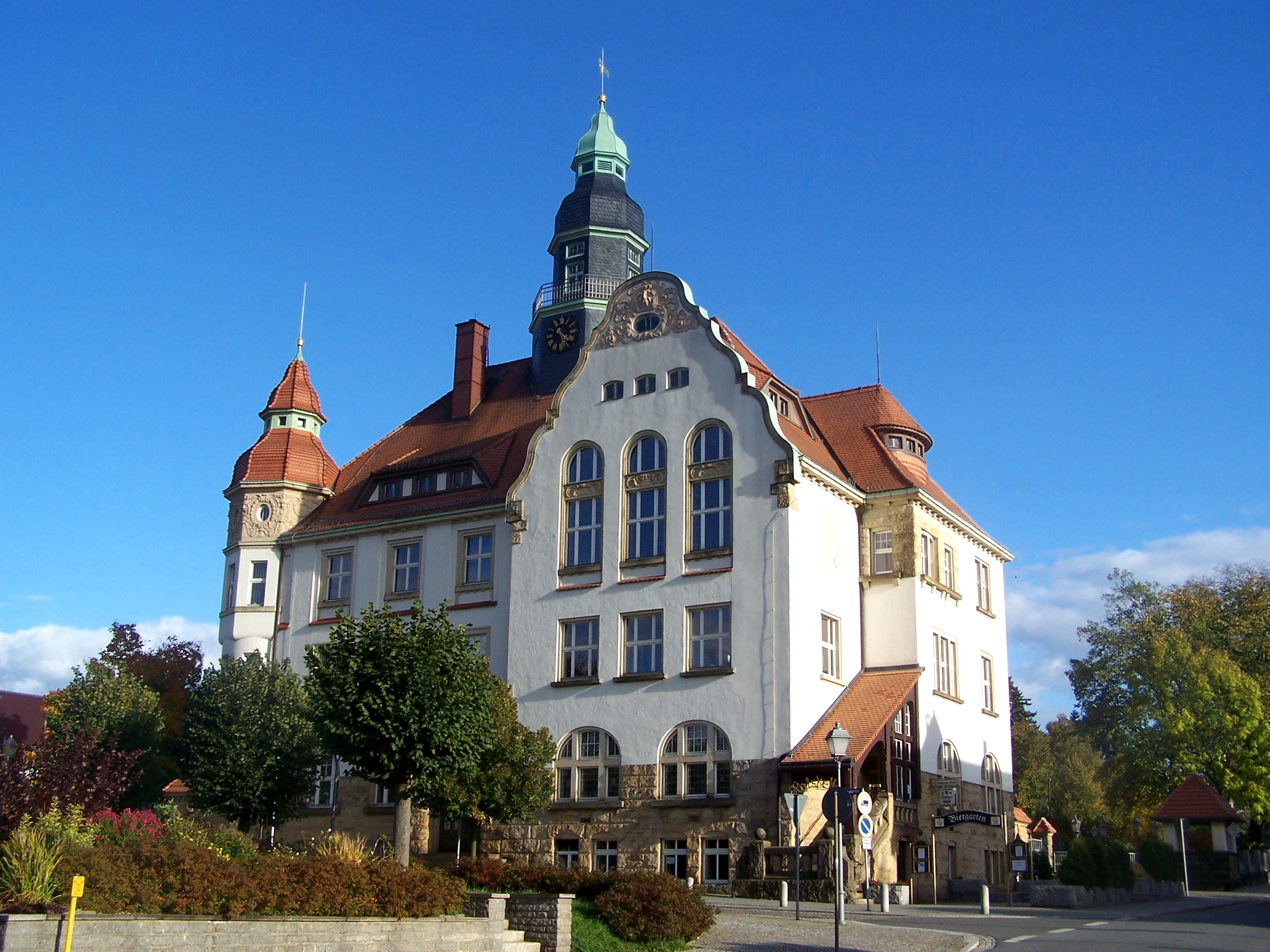
- Town hall

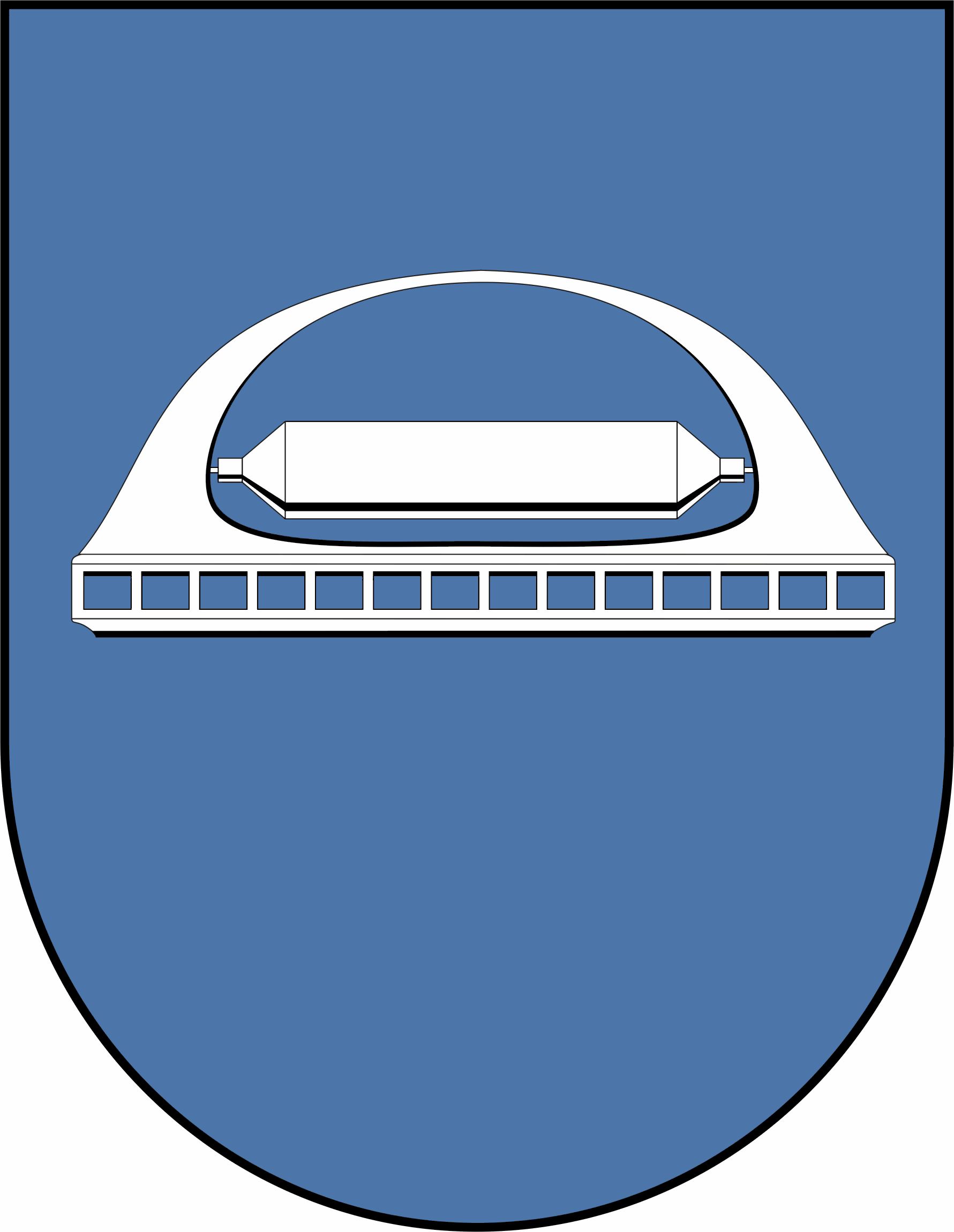
- Coat of arms

- Location of Großröhrsdorf within Bautzen district
- Interactive map of Großröhrsdorf
- Location within Germany Location within Saxony
- Coordinates: 51°08′40″N 14°1′0″E
- Country: Germany
- State: Saxony
- District: Bautzen
- Subdivisions: 2

Government
  - Mayor (2019–26): Stefan Schneider (CDU)

Area
  - Total: 40.94 km^{2} (15.81 sq mi)
- Elevation: 279 m (915 ft)

Population (2025-12-31)
  - Total: 9,480
  - Density: 232/km^{2} (600/sq mi)
- Time zone: UTC+01:00 (CET)
  - Summer (DST): UTC+02:00 (CEST)
- Postal codes: 01900
- Dialling codes: 035952
- Vehicle registration: BZ, BIW, HY, KM
- Website: www.grossroehrsdorf.de

Großröhrsdorf (German pronunciation: [ˌɡʁoːsˈʁøːɐ̯sdɔʁf]; Upper Sorbian: Wulke Rědorjecy) is a town in the district of Bautzen, in the eastern part of Saxony, Germany. It is situated 12 km west of Bischofswerda, and 22 km northeast of Dresden. The town extends for about 4 km along the old post road that runs through it.

== History ==
From 1952 to 1990, Großröhrsdorf was part of the East German Bezirk Dresden.
