= Bautzen (district) =

Coordinates: 51°17′N 14°16′E

Bautzen Wokrjes Budyšin
- District
- Flag Coat of arms
- Country: Germany
- State: Saxony
- Capital: Bautzen

Government
  - District admin.: Udo Witschas (CDU)

Area
  - Total: 2,390.7 km^{2} (923.1 sq mi)

Population (31 December 2025)
  - Total: 290,610
  - Density: 121.56/km^{2} (314.84/sq mi)
- Time zone: UTC+01:00 (CET)
  - Summer (DST): UTC+02:00 (CEST)
- Vehicle registration: BZ, BIW, HY, KM
- Website: www.landkreis-bautzen.de

The district of Bautzen (German: Landkreis Bautzen, Upper Sorbian: Wokrjes Budyšin) is a district in the state of Saxony in Germany. Its largest towns are Bautzen, Bischofswerda, Kamenz, Hoyerswerda and Radeberg. It is the biggest district in Saxony by area, and a member of the Neisse Euroregion.

It is bordered to the south by the Czech Republic. Clockwise, it also borders the district of Sächsische Schweiz-Osterzgebirge, the district-free city of Dresden, the district of Meißen, the state of Brandenburg, and the district of Görlitz.

The municipality's centre, north and east are part of the recognized Sorbian settlement area in Saxony. The Upper Sorbian language has an official status next to German in that area, and all villages bear names in both languages.

== History ==
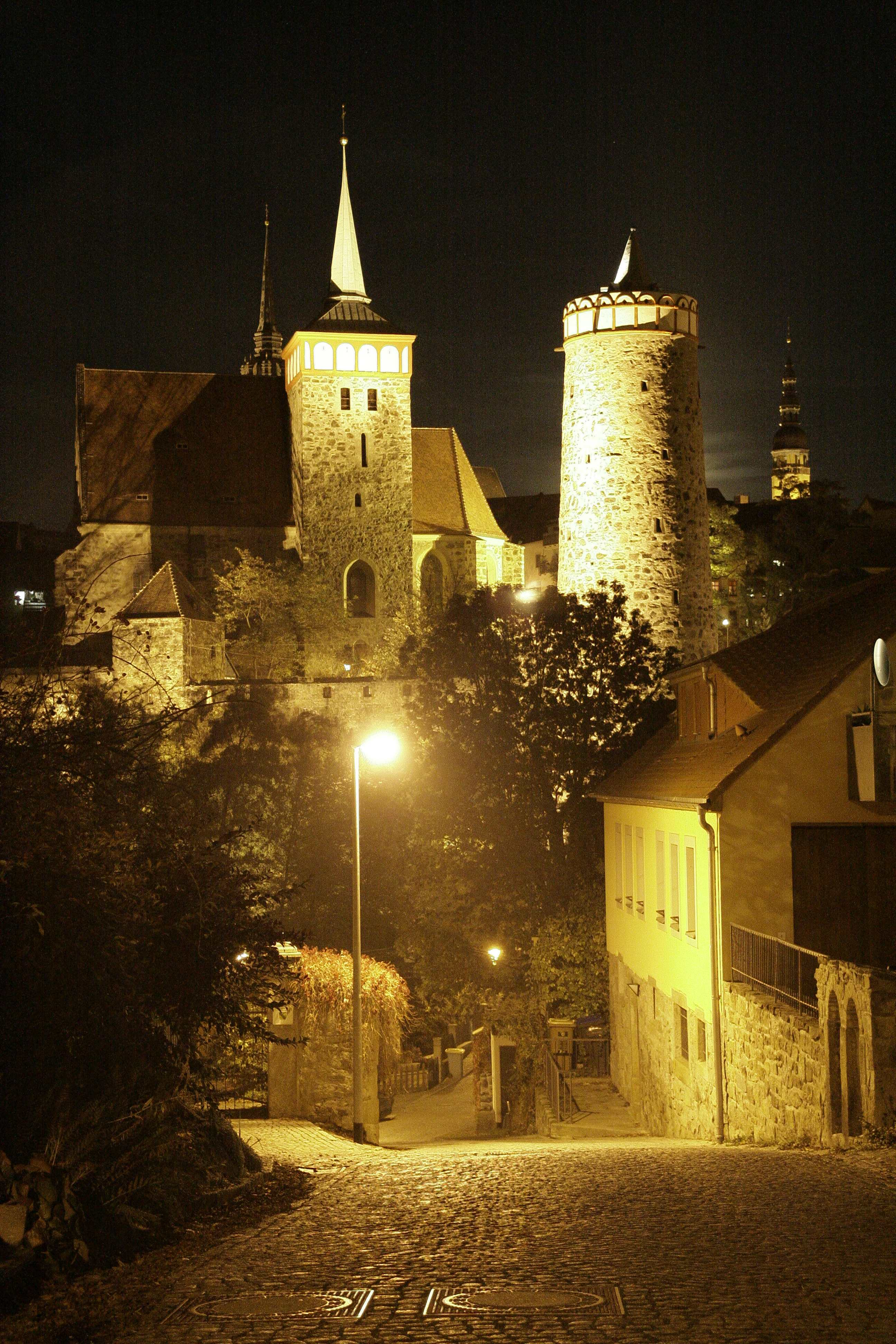
The town of Bautzen

Historically, most of Upper Lusatia belonged to Bohemia. In the Thirty Years' War, it became a part of Saxony. Only the small town of Schirgiswalde remained Bohemian until 1809.

In the time of the GDR, these areas were within the Bezirk Dresden (the districts/Kreise of Bautzen, Bischofswerda and Kamenz) or the Bezirk Cottbus (Kreis Hoyerswerda).

A new district of Bautzen was established in 1994 by merging the former districts of Bautzen and Bischofswerda. The district at that time was less than half the size of the current district. The district of Kamenz (1,340km²) and the district-free city of Hoyerswerda were merged into the district of Bautzen in August 2008.

== Geography ==
The district of Bautzen is part of the region of Upper Lusatia (Oberlausitz). The south of the district is occupied by the Lusatian Mountains, and the countryside slopes away to the north.

The Spree river enters the district from the southeast and runs through Schirgiswalde and Bautzen before leaving to the north. North of Bautzen, the river is dammed by a reservoir (Talsperre Bautzen, 5.5 km²).

At its widest, the district is 65 km east–west, and 63 km north–south.

== Towns and municipalities ==
The following is a clickable map of municipalities in the district, in German:

Clickable map of municipalities in the district

This lists the towns and municipalities by their German-language names, with Upper Sorbian names in parentheses:

Towns
Municipalities

1. Bautzen (Budyšin)
2. Bernsdorf (Njedźichow)
3. Bischofswerda (Biskupicy)
4. Elstra (Halštrow)
5. Großröhrsdorf
6. Hoyerswerda (Wojerecy)
7. Kamenz (Kamjenc)
8. Königsbrück (Kinspork)
9. Lauta (Łuty)
10. Pulsnitz (Połčnica)
11. Radeberg
12. Schirgiswalde-Kirschau
13. Weißenberg (Wospork)
14. Wilthen (Wjelećin)
15. Wittichenau (Kulow)
1. Arnsdorf
2. Burkau (Porchow)
3. Cunewalde (Kumwałd)
4. Demitz-Thumitz (Zemicy-Tumicy)
5. Doberschau-Gaußig (Dobruša-Huska)
6. Elsterheide (Halštrowska hola)
7. Frankenthal
8. Göda (Hodźij)
9. Großdubrau (Wulka Dubrawa)
10. Großharthau
11. Großnaundorf
12. Großpostwitz (Budestecy)
13. Haselbachtal
14. Laußnitz (Łužnica)
15. Hochkirch (Bukecy)
16. Lichtenberg
17. Königswartha (Rakecy)
18. Kubschütz (Kubšicy)
19. Lohsa (Łaz)
20. Malschwitz (Malešecy)
21. Neschwitz (Njeswaćidło)
22. Neukirch (bei Königsbrück)
23. Neukirch/Lausitz (Wjazońca)
24. Obergurig (Hornja Hórka)
25. Ohorn
26. Oßling (Wóslink)
27. Ottendorf-Okrilla
28. Puschwitz (Bóšicy)
29. Radibor (Radwor)
30. Rammenau (Ramnow)
31. Schmölln-Putzkau (Smělna-Póckowy)
32. Schwepnitz (Sepicy)
33. Sohland an der Spree (Załom)
34. Spreetal (Sprjewiny doł)
35. Steina
36. Steinigtwolmsdorf
37. Wachau

Verwaltungsverband

Am Klosterwasser (Při Klóšterskej wodźe)

1. Crostwitz (Chrósćicy)
2. Nebelschütz (Njebjelćicy)
3. Panschwitz-Kuckau^{1} (Pančicy-Kukow)
4. Räckelwitz (Worklecy)
5. Ralbitz-Rosenthal (Ralbicy-Róžant)
^{1}seat of the Verwaltungsverband;

== Coat of arms ==
The district's arms are identical to the arms of the margravate of Upper Lusatia. The coat of arms was established about 1350, when six towns of Upper Lusatia founded a confederacy. This loose alliance became a margravate under the Bohemian crown in 1378.
