= West Lusatia =

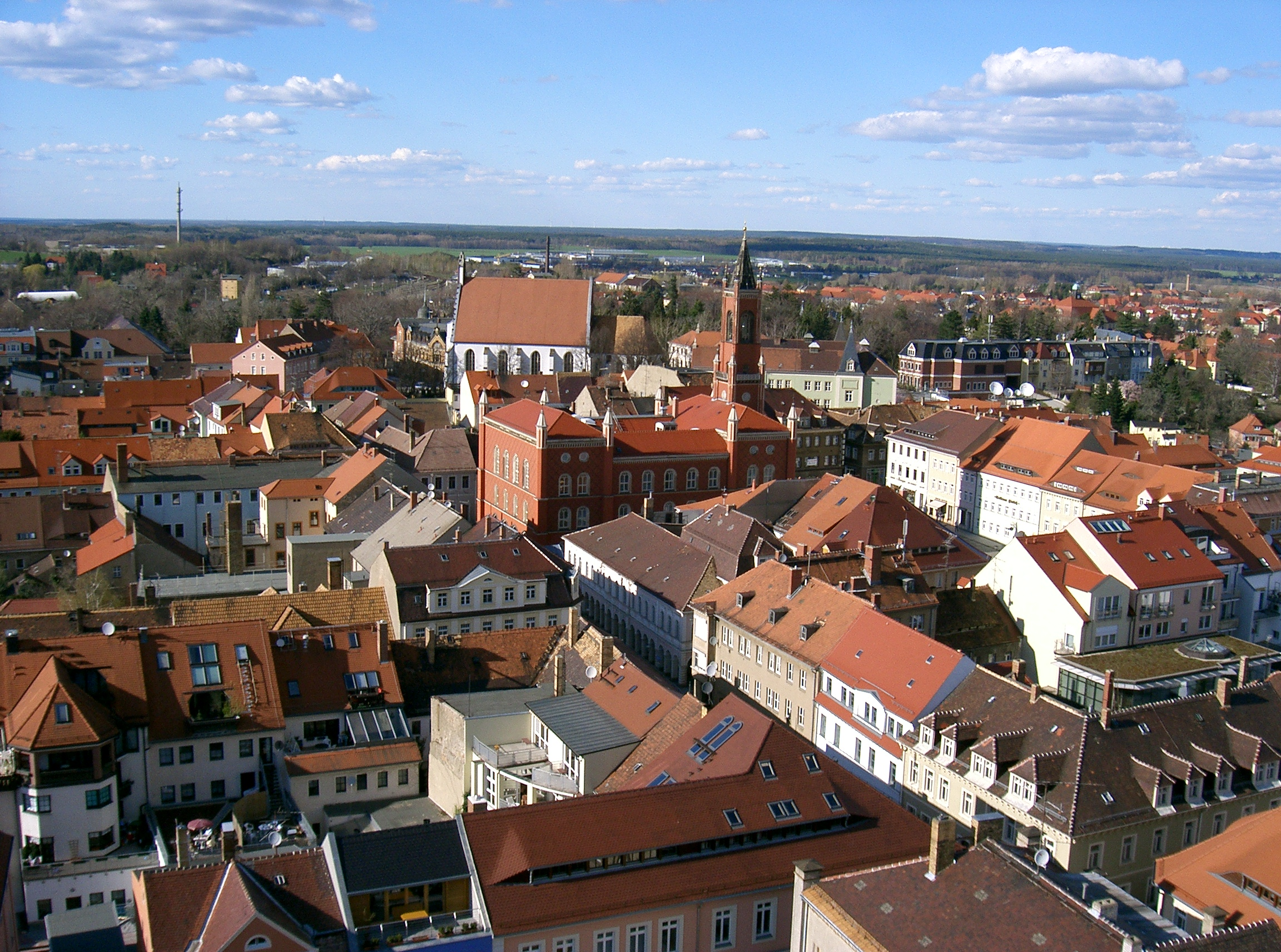
View over Kamenz's old town, looking north

The term West Lusatia (German: Westlausitz; Upper Sorbian: Zapadna Łužica) was coined in the 1950s for the old counties of Hoyerswerda, Kamenz and Bischofswerda (today in the north and west of the county of Bautzen) – mainly in order to make the Museum of West Lusatia into a centrepoint. Culturally and historically, West Lusatia corresponds to western Upper Lusatia, including part of the Brandenburg county of Oberspreewald-Lausitz (east of Tettau and Ruhland), between the rivers Pulsnitz and Black Elster.

The north of West Lusatia is characterized by the gently undulating to almost level heather-covered moors of the natural region of Königsbrück-Ruhland Heaths, interspersed with ponds and small rivers that drain the once marshy terrain - to the west and south, especially via the Pulsnitz and its tributaries, the Haselbach and Otterbach, and in the north via the Black Elster. Located in the northeast Heath, the Königsbrück Training Area was heavily used in the 20th century. Since then, it has become an extensive conservation area that can only be entered with a guide among, not least because of the munitions that still exist off the beaten track.

In the south, West Lusatia is covered by rolling to hilly terrain with wooded summits. The highest hills, such as the highly visible Keulenberg, are over 400 metres high and have an upland character. Almost the entire West Lusatia is designated as a protected area and nature reserve.

The name has been transferred to its adjoining natural region to the southwest, an area that extends as far as the Dresden Basin, and has been named the West Lusatian Hill Country and Uplands (Westlausitzer Hügel- und Bergland). However, most of this natural region is in the county of Meissen today and only a small part of it actually lies in the historic land of Upper Lusatia.

Important towns in West Lusatia are Hoyerswerda, Kamenz, Königsbrück, Ohorn, Pulsnitz, Schwepnitz, Bernsdorf, Ruhland, Oßling, Haselbachtal, Elstra and Bischofswerda.

The Museum of West Lusatia in Kamenz offers comprehensive information on the geology, nature, history and community of this land.

== Literature ==
- Friedrich Bernhard Störzner: Was die Heimat erzählt. Verlag Arwed Strauch, Leipzig, 1904.
- Olaf Bastian: Die Westlausitz: Grenzen und Naturräume. Berichte der Naturforschenden Gesellschaft der Oberlausitz, Vol. 14, 2007
