= Käbnitz =

River in Germany

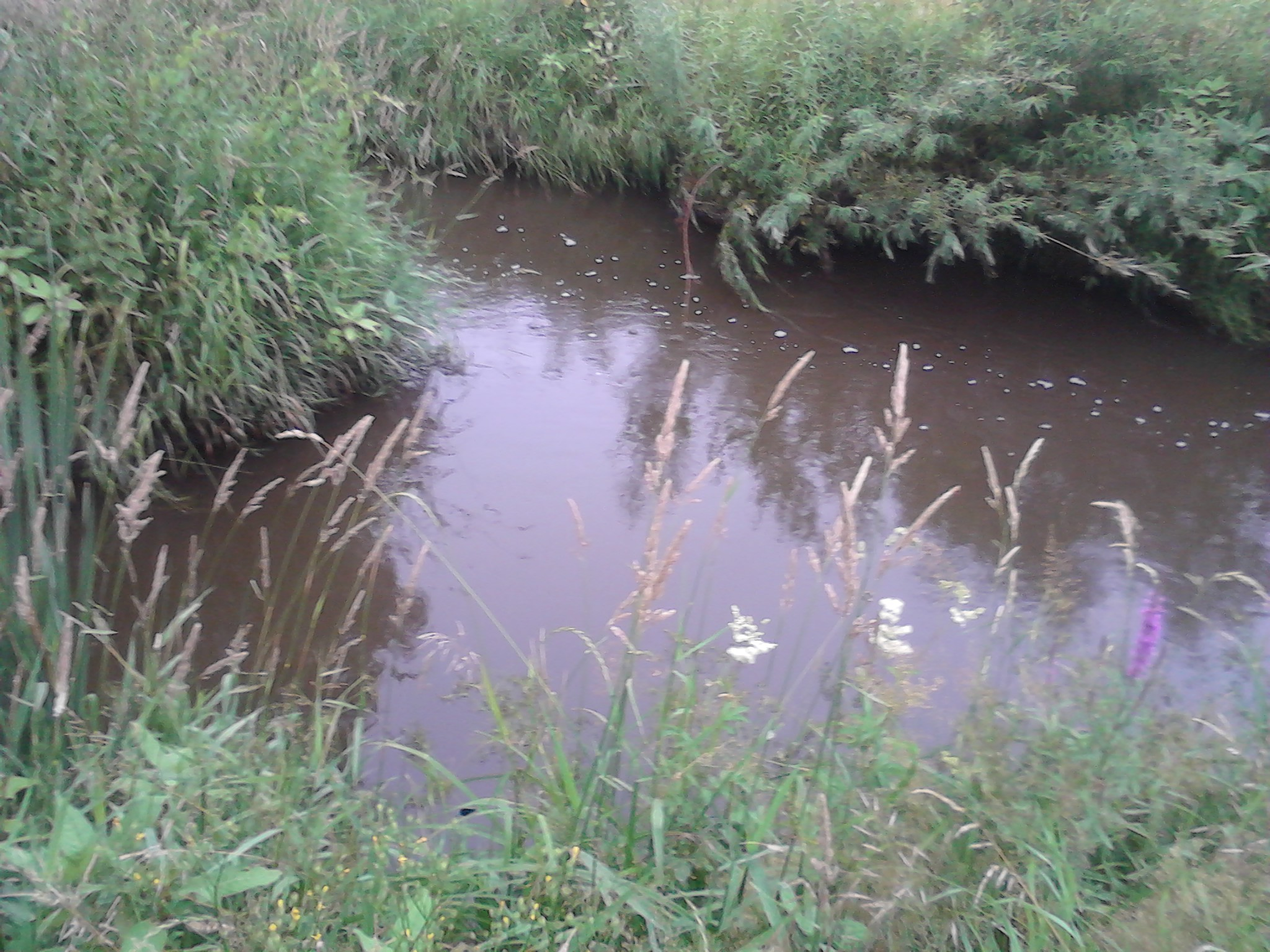
- Mouth of the Käbnitz in the Pulsnitz

Location
- Country: Germany
- States: Saxony

Physical characteristics
- Source
  - elevation: 183 m (600 ft)
- Mouth
  - location: Pulsnitz, Königsbrück
  - coordinates: 51°15′56″N 13°53′50″E
  - elevation: 167 m (548 ft)
- Length: 1.6 km (0.99 mi)

Basin features
- Progression: Pulsnitz→ Black Elster→ Elbe→ North Sea

Käbnitz is a stream in Königsbrück, Saxony, Germany. It is a tributary of the Pulsnitz.

== See also ==
- List of rivers of Saxony
