= Haselbach (Pulsnitz) =

River in Germany

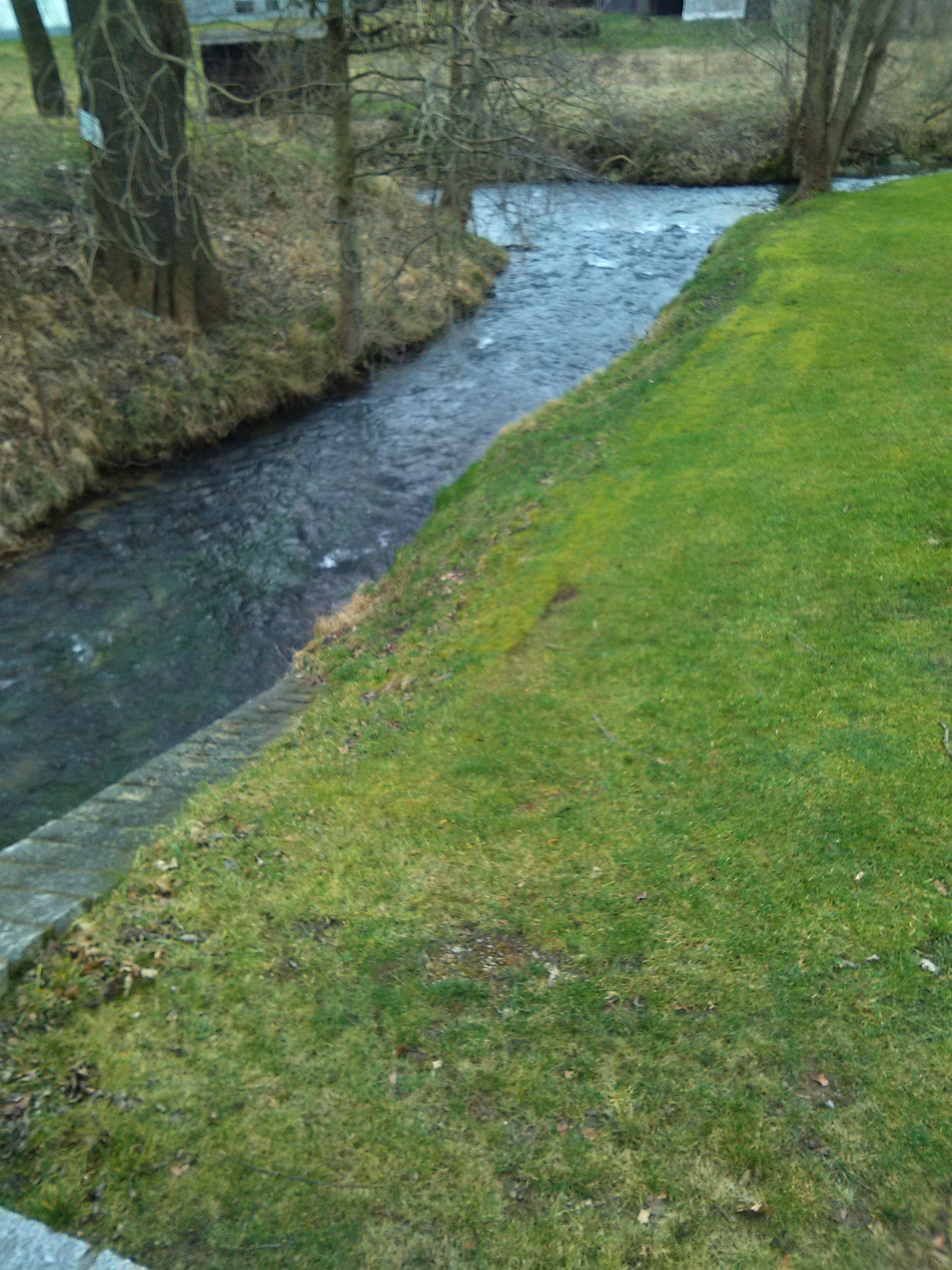

Location
- Country: Germany
- States: Saxony

Physical characteristics
- Mouth
  - location: Pulsnitz
  - coordinates: 51.2514°N 13.9723°E

Basin features
- Progression: Pulsnitz→ Black Elster→ Elbe→ North Sea

The Haselbach (German pronunciation: [ˈhaːzl̩bax]) is a river of Saxony, Germany. It is a right tributary of the Pulsnitz, which it joins near Reichenau.

== See also ==
- List of rivers of Saxony
