= Oberlichtenau =

- Stadtteil of Pulsnitz
- Coat of arms
- Interactive map of Oberlichtenau
- Location within Germany Location within Saxony
- Coordinates: 51°13′15″N 13°59′30″E
- Country: Germany
- State: Saxony
- District: Bautzen
- Town: Pulsnitz

Area
  - Total: 10.03 km^{2} (3.87 sq mi)
- Elevation: 270 m (890 ft)

Population (2006-12-31)
  - Total: 1,472
  - Density: 146.8/km^{2} (380.1/sq mi)
- Time zone: UTC+01:00 (CET)
  - Summer (DST): UTC+02:00 (CEST)
- Postal codes: 01936
- Dialling codes: 035955
- Vehicle registration: BZ
- Website: www.oberlichtenau.de

Oberlichtenau (Upper Sorbian: Hornja Lichtenawa) is a village and a former municipality in the district of Bautzen, in Saxony. Since 1 January 2009, it has been part of the town of Pulsnitz.

== History ==
=== General history ===
The Population was 1,425 by 2008 and 1,588 by 2000, in accordance with entry in the history list of Saxony; 2008 according to the statistical State Agency. As the Pulsnitz was border between Saxony and Germany until the beginning of the 19th century, also top and Niederlichtenau shared in a meißnisch Saxon and upper lausitzisch Bohemian part. A part of the town Pulsnitz became Oberlichtenau independent municipality on 1 January 2009.

=== The Schloss Oberlichtenau ===
In the 1718, the count Christian Gottlieb von Holzendorff had inherited the Manor of Oberlichtenau and thus the land for Schloss Oberlichtenau. In order to promote to his heritage, he needed an elegant accommodation befitting of his status in life. This was why in 1724 he had a baroque palace, in both the English and French style, and an English and French designed park, with valuable sandstone sculptures (front of and behind the building) put in situe.

The Schloss Oberlichtenau went from one owner to another from the late 19th century to the end of World War II, when it was expropriated in 1945. The castle served as a children's home in East Germany. Since October 2008 it got a new owner and the park was and still is freely accessible to the public.

== Local culture and sightseeing ==
=== Buildings and sights ===
- The Baroque chateau with Baroque Park, see Schloss Oberlichtenau
- Church of St. Martin (today from the year 1500)
- Bee Museum with show bee and Heimatstube
- Monument-protected, former greenhouse of the castle gardens (ceramic workshop for Biblical use ceramic)
- Monument-protected natural cellar to represent the energy free storage of food
- German song way with a unique Mühleweg
- Historical barrel cellar with Israeli wine and beer
- Club, restaurant, observation tower, ruins, Bismarck Memorial and August column
- Byzantine Basilica (ready-to-shell on 10 September 2006)

=== Biblical Garden ===
The Biblical Garden in Oberlichtenau represents elements from Biblical times as the first garden of its kind in Germany. This garden was opened on 8 June 2005 and attracts school groups and community groups of various Christian churches since that time. Here, objects (resigned altar, Felsengrab, Steinbruchhebekran and many more) and plants from the biblical period on an open space are shown. For a Byzantine Basilica, the cornerstone was laid on 20 May 2006. The miniature Basilica reached the 7th place in the competition to the German tourism award 2007. It was the Viblical Garden by the Saxon Minister of State, Frank copper the best holiday destination in the countryside 2009 appointed.

== Geography ==
Oberlichtenau is located about 12 km southwest of Kamenz and about 30 km northeast of Dresden. The A 4 is on the interchange Pulsnitz around 8 km away. Oberlichtenau is located in the Western Upper Lusatia in the valley of Pulsnitz river, between the hills of Lusatian hills (highest peak Mountain Club with 413 m), in the transition between the shallow pond landscape in the North and the Lausitzer Bergland in the South. The municipality of Oberlichtenau consisted of the two districts Oberlichtenau and Niederlichtenau. For the municipality of Oberlichtenau was not the town Constitution.

== Economy and infrastructure ==
=== Transport ===
The bus routes 170 and 312 offer connections to Pulsnitz, the closest railway station on the Kamenz–Pirna railway line, four miles south of Oberlichtenau. Route 312 also serves Königsbrück railway station on the Königsbrück–Dresden railway line.

=== Tourism ===
Oberlichtenau has several hotels.

== Education ==
Oberlichtenau has a primary school.

== Local people of note ==
- Carsten Guhr (born 1979), former mayor of Oberlichtenau to took office of 22 years old and therefore youngest Mayor Germany.
- Walter Grundmann (born 1906), EV. Luth Pastor in Oberlichtenau, Chief of Entjudaisierungsinstitutes in Eisenach, theologian and Stasimitarbeiter.
- Paul Graf Vitzthum of Eckstaedt (1850–1911), German General and Chief of staff of the Saxon army.

== Imagery ==
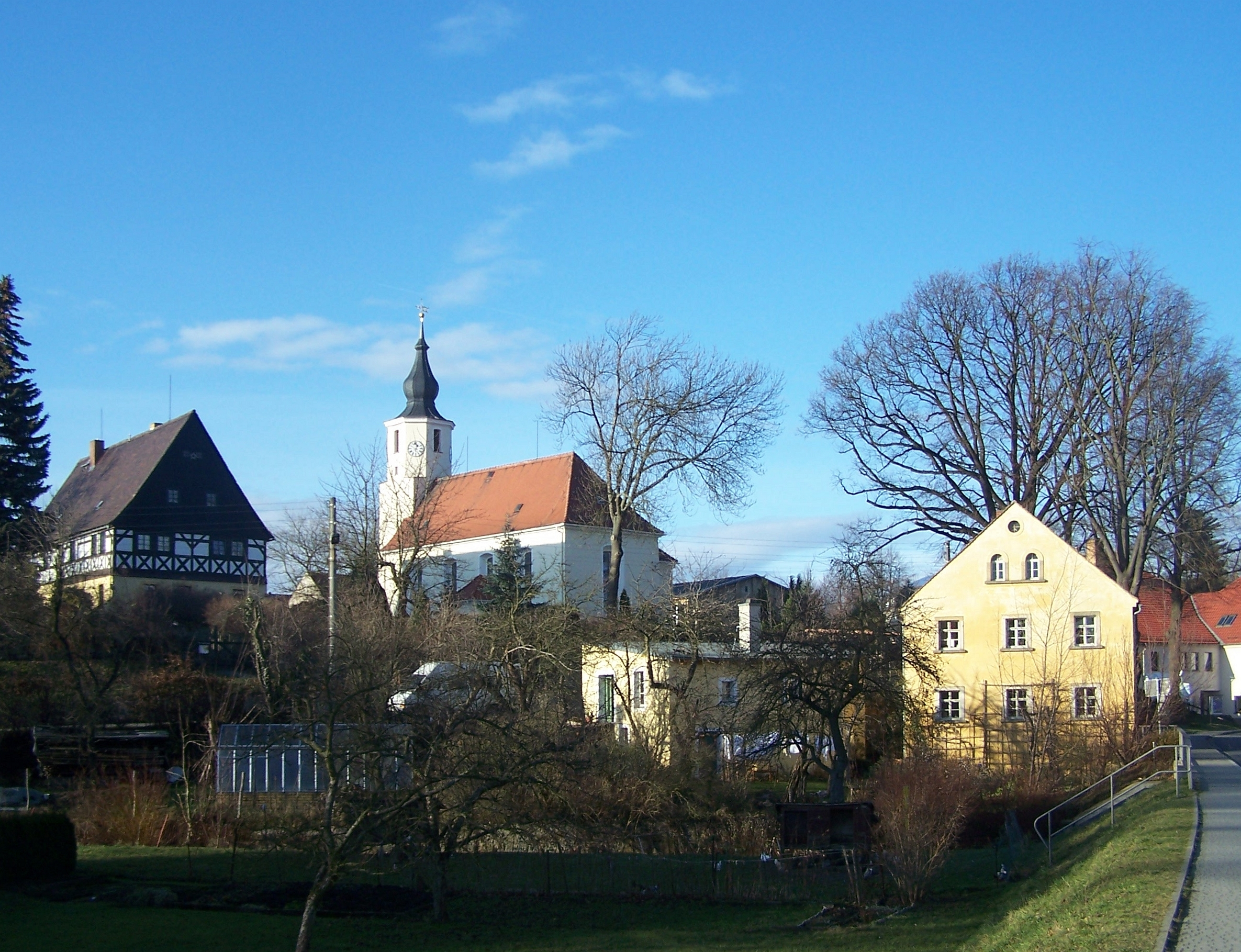
The Ortsansicht Church.

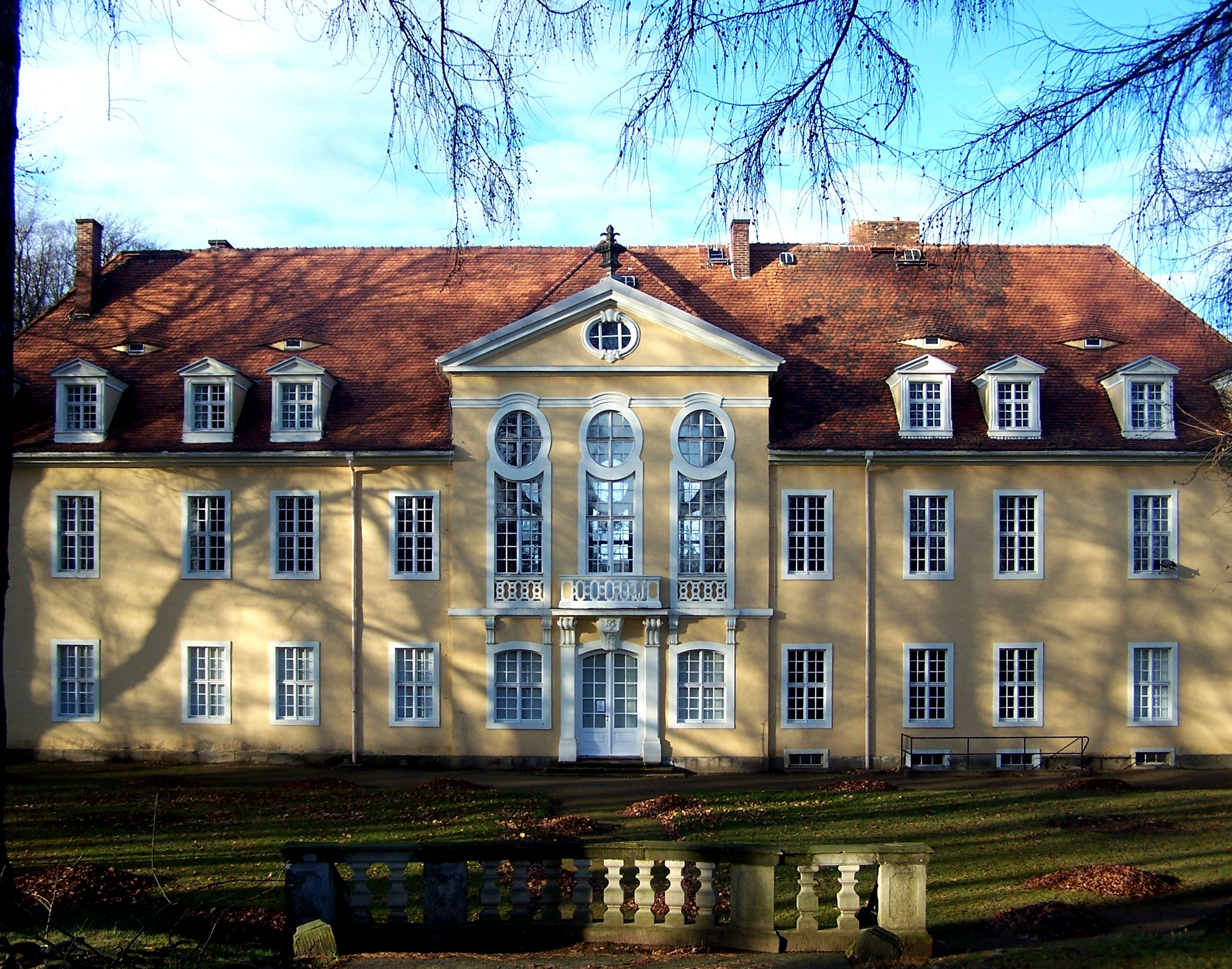
The Schloss Oberlichtenau.

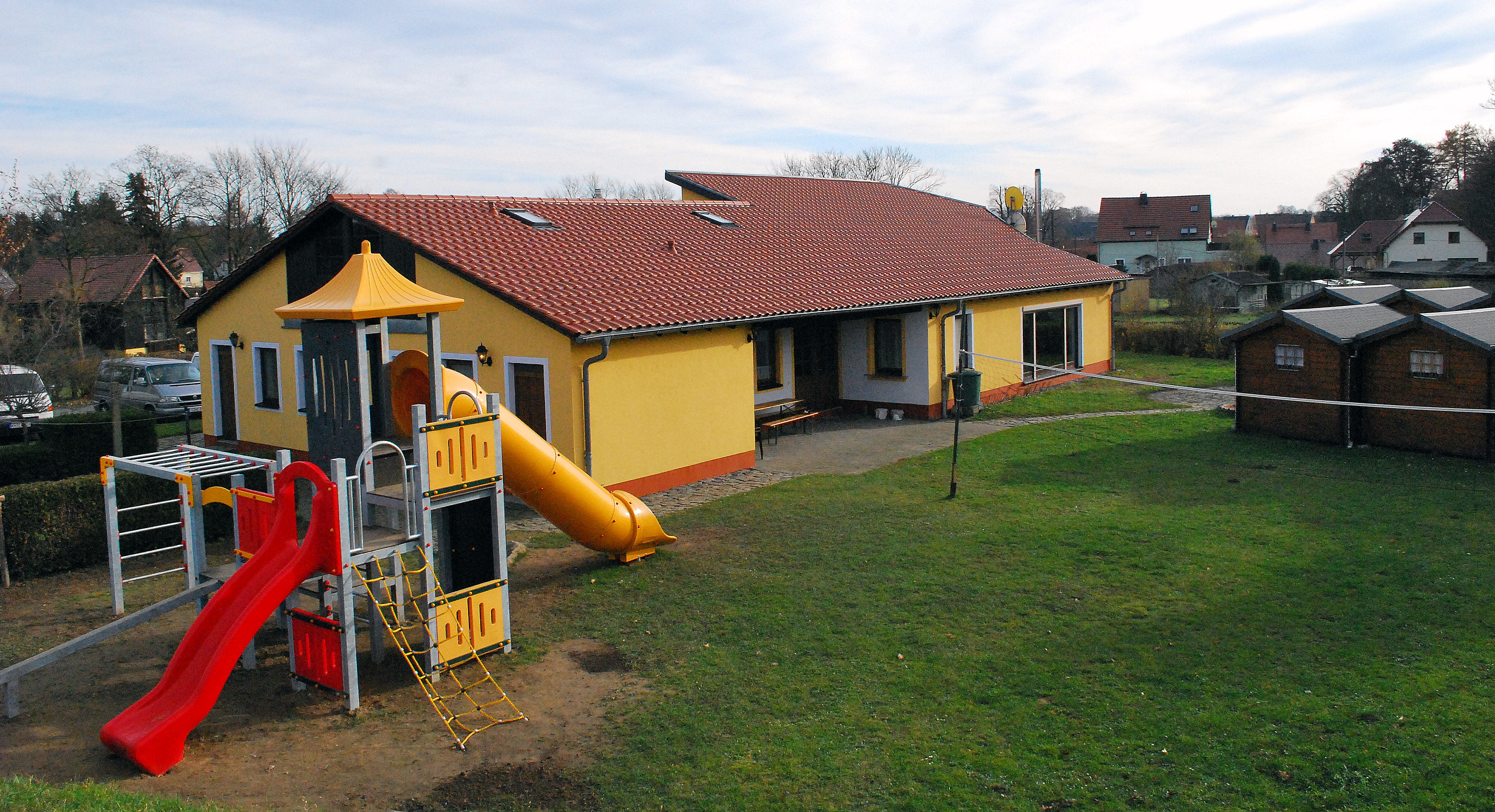
Feriensiedlung Pulsnitztal in the Pulsnitz-Oberlichtenau region, near Dresden.

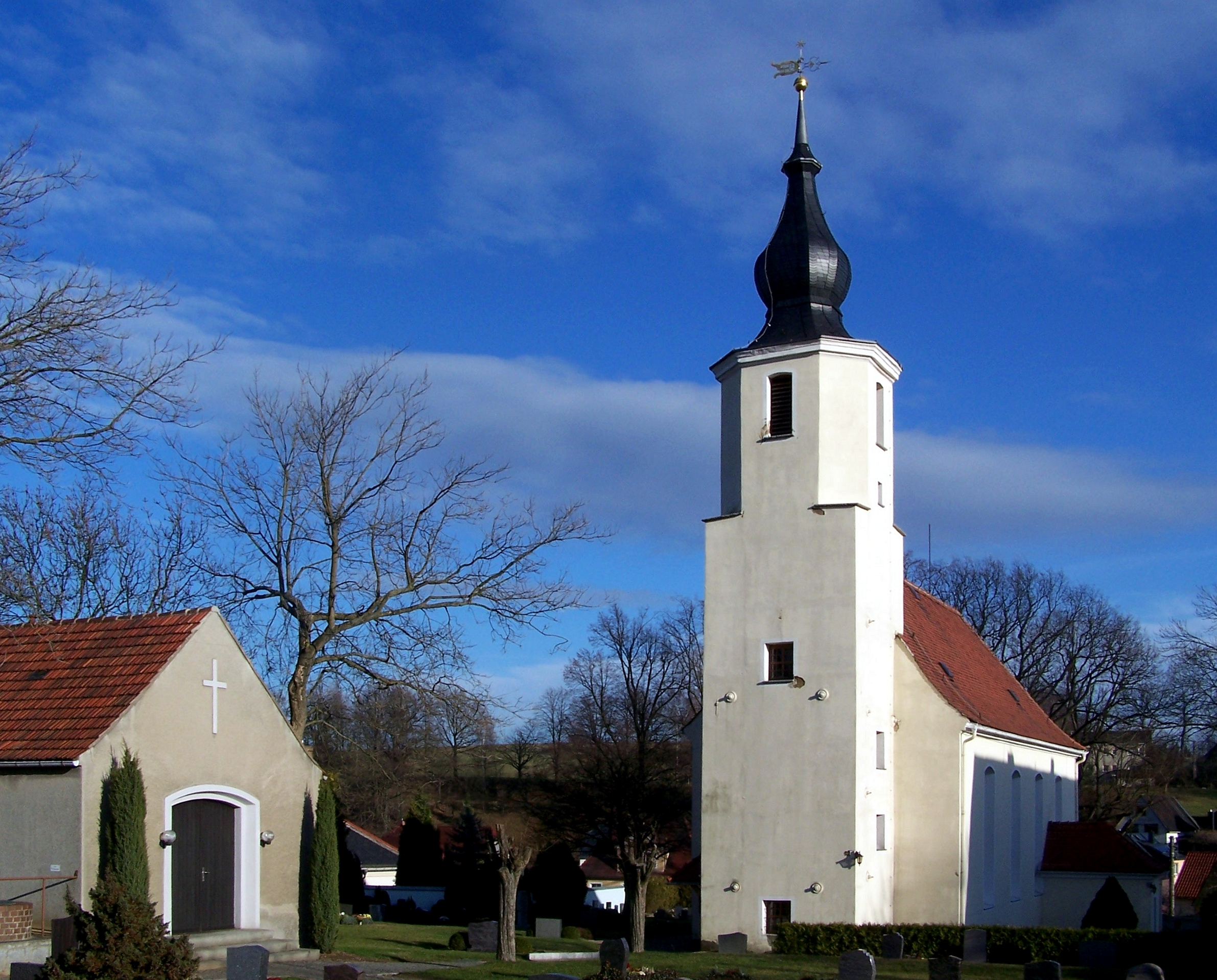
the Church of St. Martin.

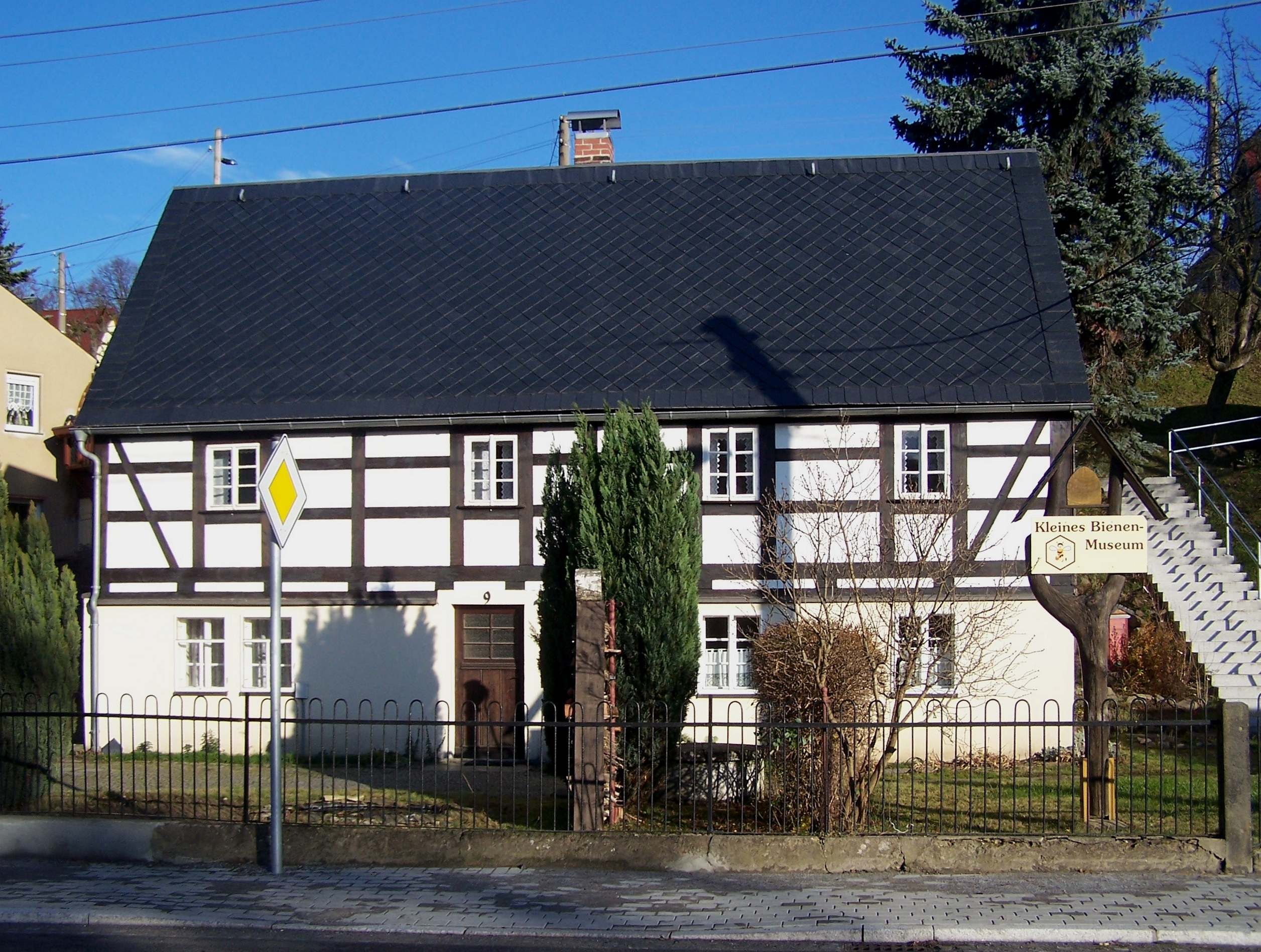
the Bienen-museum.
