= Kremitz (river) =

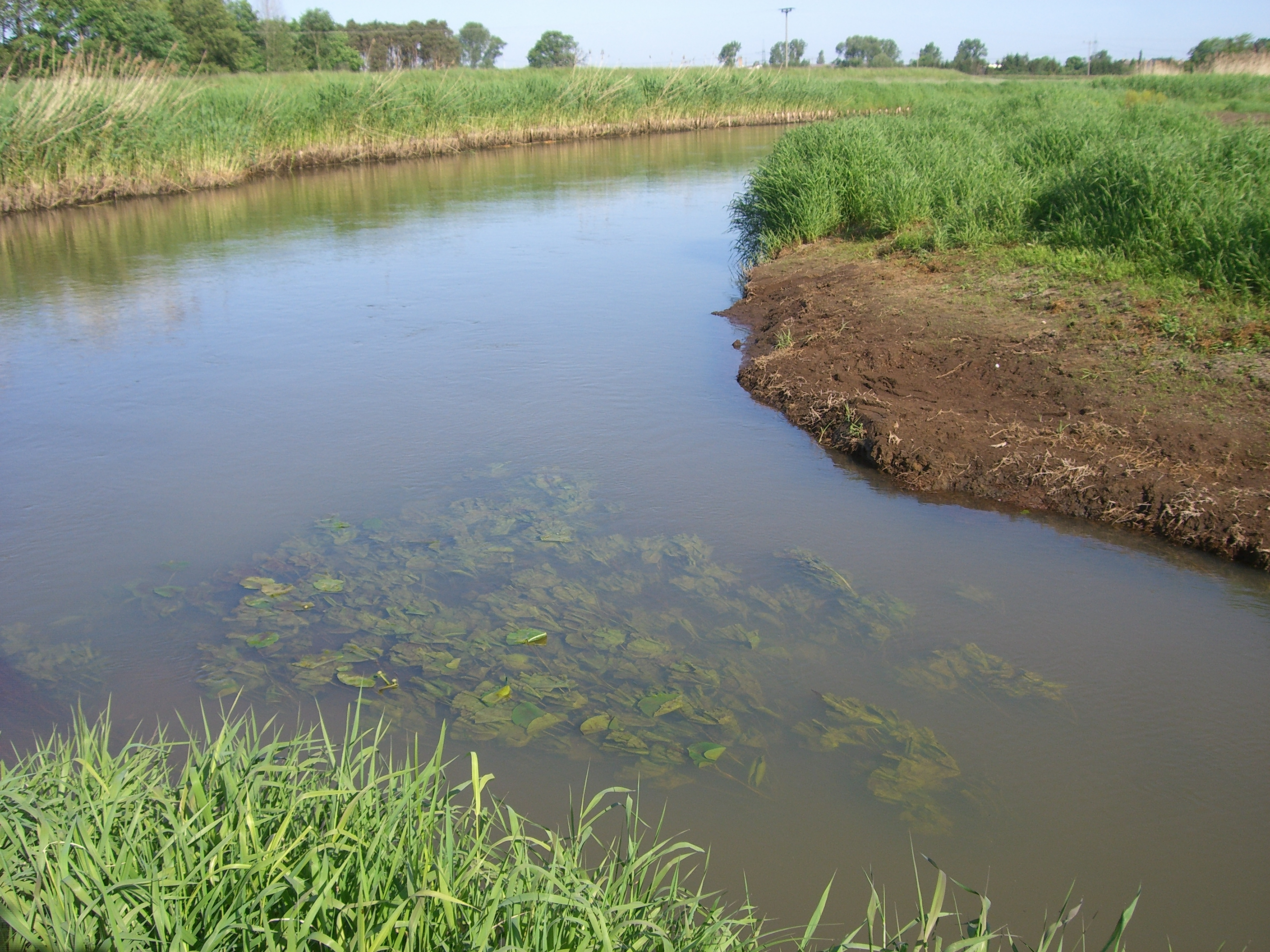
- The confluence of the Kremitz and the Black Elster between Löben and Mönchenhöfe

Location
- Location: Brandenburg, Saxony-Anhalt (Germany)
- Reference no.: DE: 53878

Physical characteristics
- Source
  - location: west of Hillmersdorf
  - coordinates: 51°42′39″N 13°29′05″E
  - elevation: 92 m above sea level (NN)
- Mouth
  - location: Black Elster near Mönchenhöfe, (Saxony-Anhalt)
  - coordinates: 51°46′47″N 13°03′59″E
  - elevation: 73 m above sea level (NN)
- Length: 30 km
- Basin size: 177 km^{2}

Basin features
- Progression: Black Elster → Elbe → North Sea
- River system: Elbe

The Kremitz is a river in the German states of Brandenburg and Saxony-Anhalt. It is a right-hand tributary of the Black Elster, joining it near Mönchenhöfe in the county of Wittenberg. The part of the river which is located on the soil of Saxony-Anhalt is about six kilometres long. The Kremitz has eleven weirs. Just before its confluence with the Black Elster the river is dyked on its right bank. The longer section is in Brandenburg, where it rises near Hillmersdorf. The catchment of the Kremitz covers an area of over 177 square kilometres.
