= Hochstein (Elstra) =

Mountain in Saxony, Germany

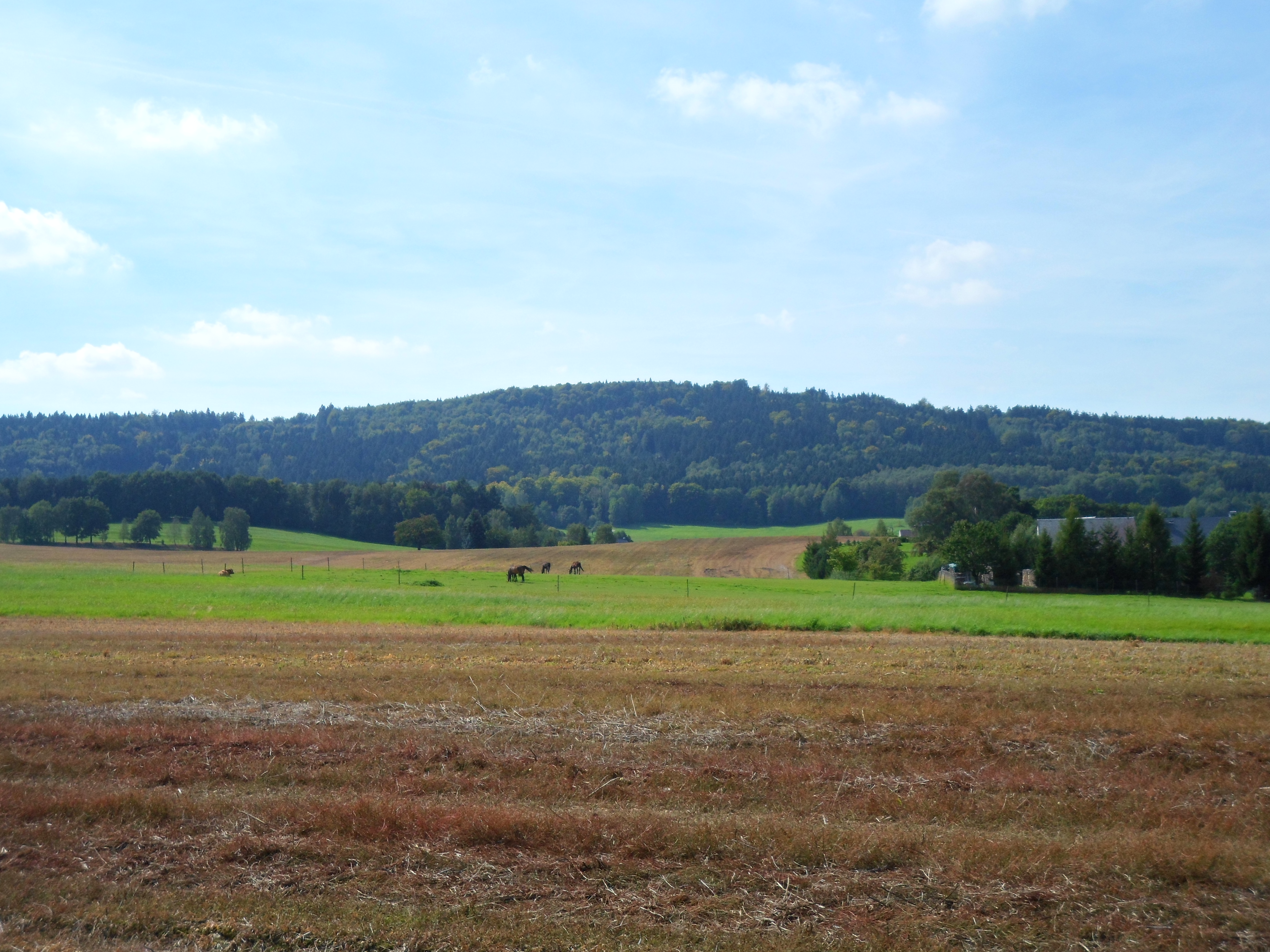
- View of Hochstein near Elstra

Highest point
- Elevation: 448.9 m (1,473 ft)
- Coordinates: 51°10′50″N 14°06′47″E

Geography
- Location within Germany Location within Saxony
- Location: Saxony, Germany
- Parent range: West Lusatian Hill Country and Uplands

Hochstein (also known as Sibyllenstein) is a small, forested mountain in the district of Bautzen in Saxony, southeastern Germany. With an elevation of about 449 m (1,473 ft), it is described as the highest summit of the North-West Lusatian hill country (Nordwestlausitzer Hügelland).

The mountain lies east of Pulsnitz and near the town of Elstra.

== Geography ==
Hochstein forms a prominent wooded summit within the gently rolling uplands of West Lusatia. The surrounding relief is characterised by a dense pattern of short valleys and ridges typical of the West Lusatian hill country.

The summit area includes exposed rock formations; the traditional name Sibyllenstein is associated with these outcrops and local tradition.

== Geology ==
The wider region belongs to the Lusatian basement and is characterised by intrusive rocks, including varieties of granodiorite documented for eastern Saxony. A major geological structure of eastern Saxony is the Lusatian thrust (Lausitzer Überschiebung), separating the Lusatian crystalline complex from younger sedimentary units of the Cretaceous basin to the south and west.

== Hydrology ==
The Black Elster river rises on the Hochstein above the locality of Kindisch in the Upper Lusatia region.

== Access ==
Hochstein is a local hiking destination. Marked walking routes connect the summit area with nearby villages and points of interest in the West Lusatian landscape protection area.

== Cultural notes ==
Early 20th-century regional literature describes the Hochstein/Sibyllenstein as a notable viewpoint and records local traditions connected with the summit rocks.
