= Kleine Elster =

River in Germany

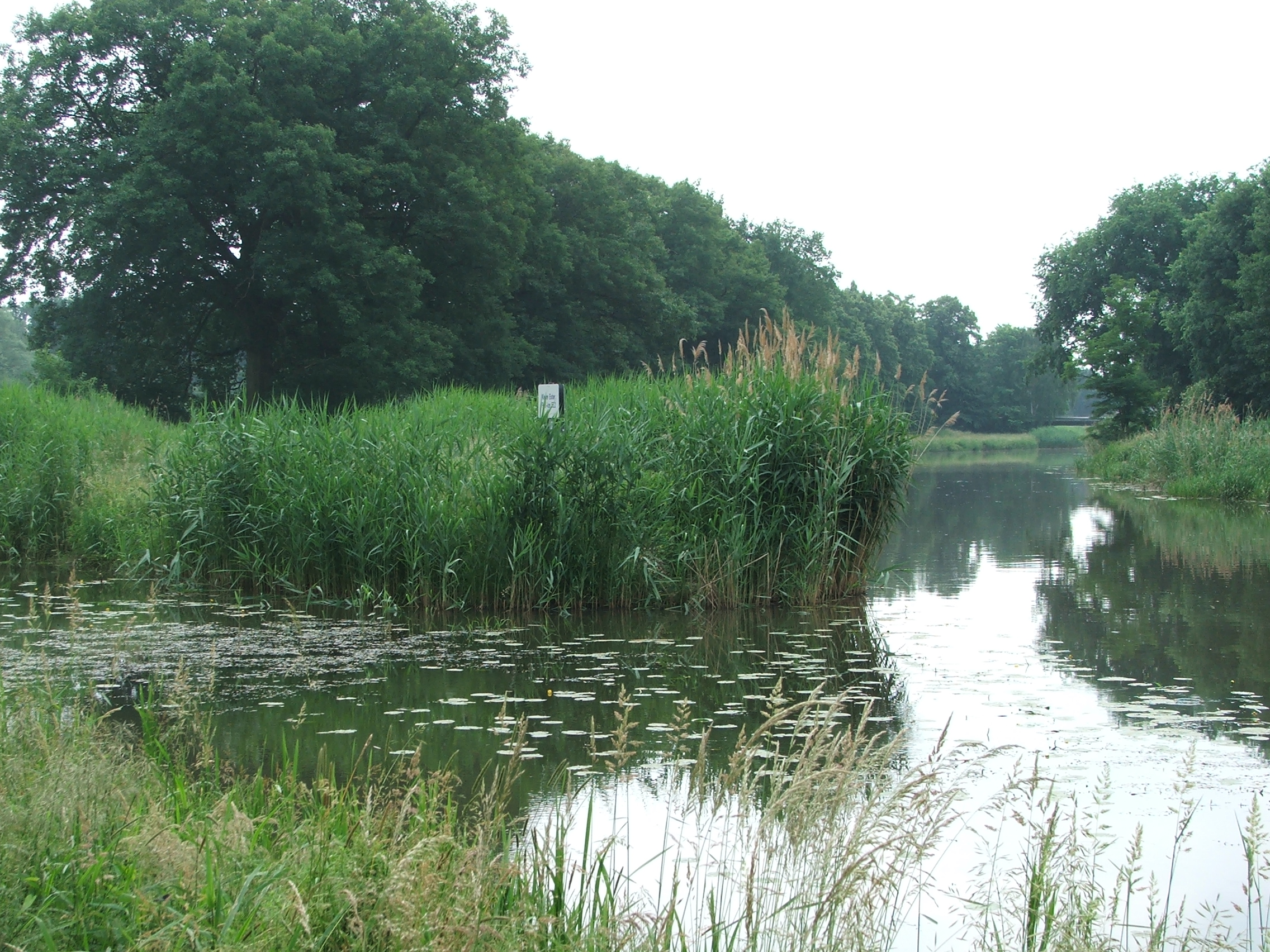

Location
- Country: Germany
- States: Brandenburg

Physical characteristics
- Mouth
  - location: Black Elster
  - coordinates: 51.5523°N 13.3665°E

Basin features
- Progression: Black Elster→ Elbe→ North Sea

Kleine Elster is a river of Brandenburg, Germany. It flows into the Black Elster in Wahrenbrück.

== See also ==
- List of rivers of Brandenburg
