= Hoyerswerdaer Schwarzwasser =

River in Germany

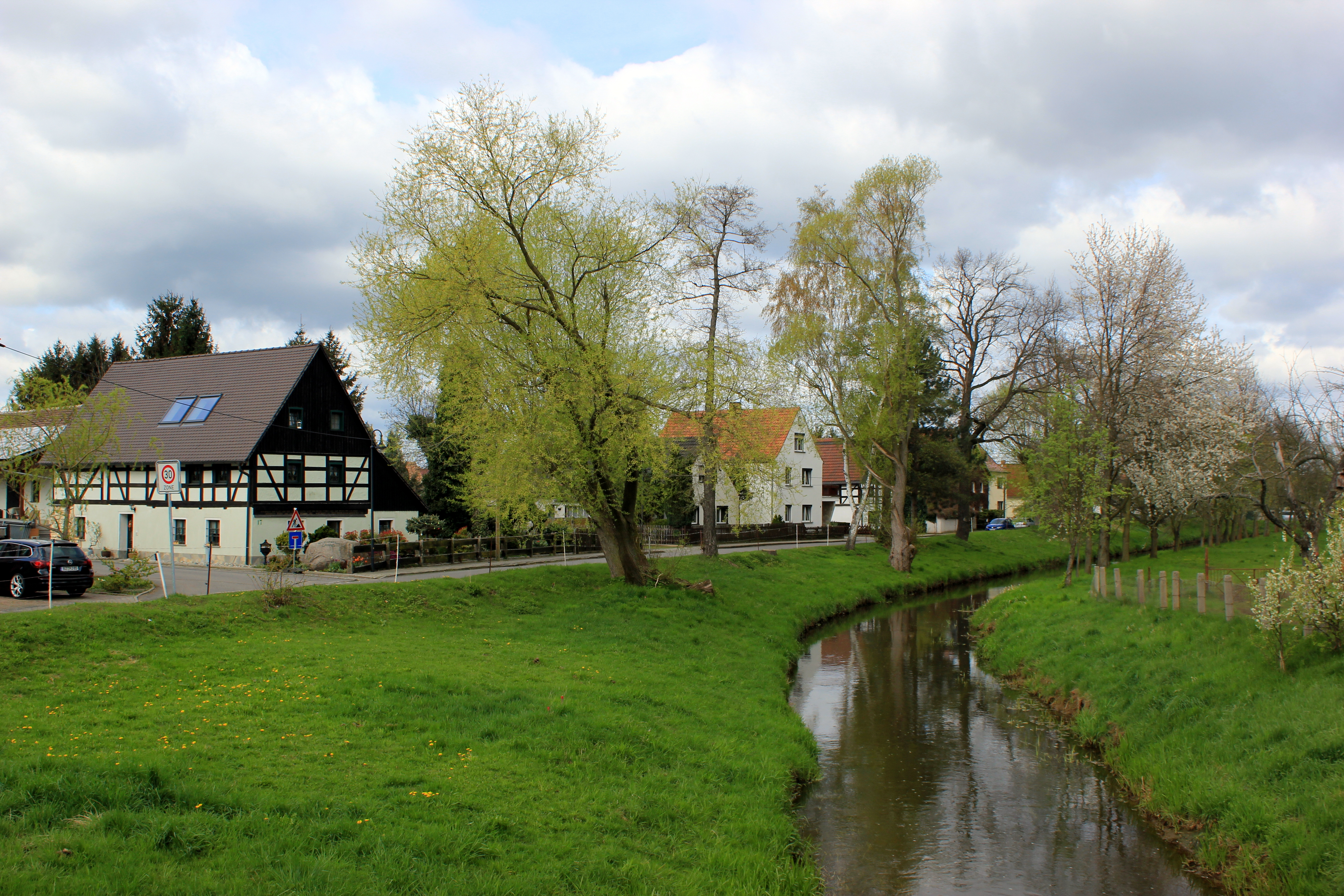

Location
- Country: Germany
- States: Saxony

Physical characteristics
- Mouth
  - location: Schwarze Elster
  - coordinates: 51.4207°N 14.2508°E

Basin features
- Progression: Black Elster→ Elbe→ North Sea

Hoyerswerdaer Schwarzwasser is a river of Saxony, Germany. It is a right tributary of the Schwarze Elster, which it joins in Hoyerswerda.

== See also ==
- List of rivers of Saxony
