= Pößnitz (river) =

River in Germany

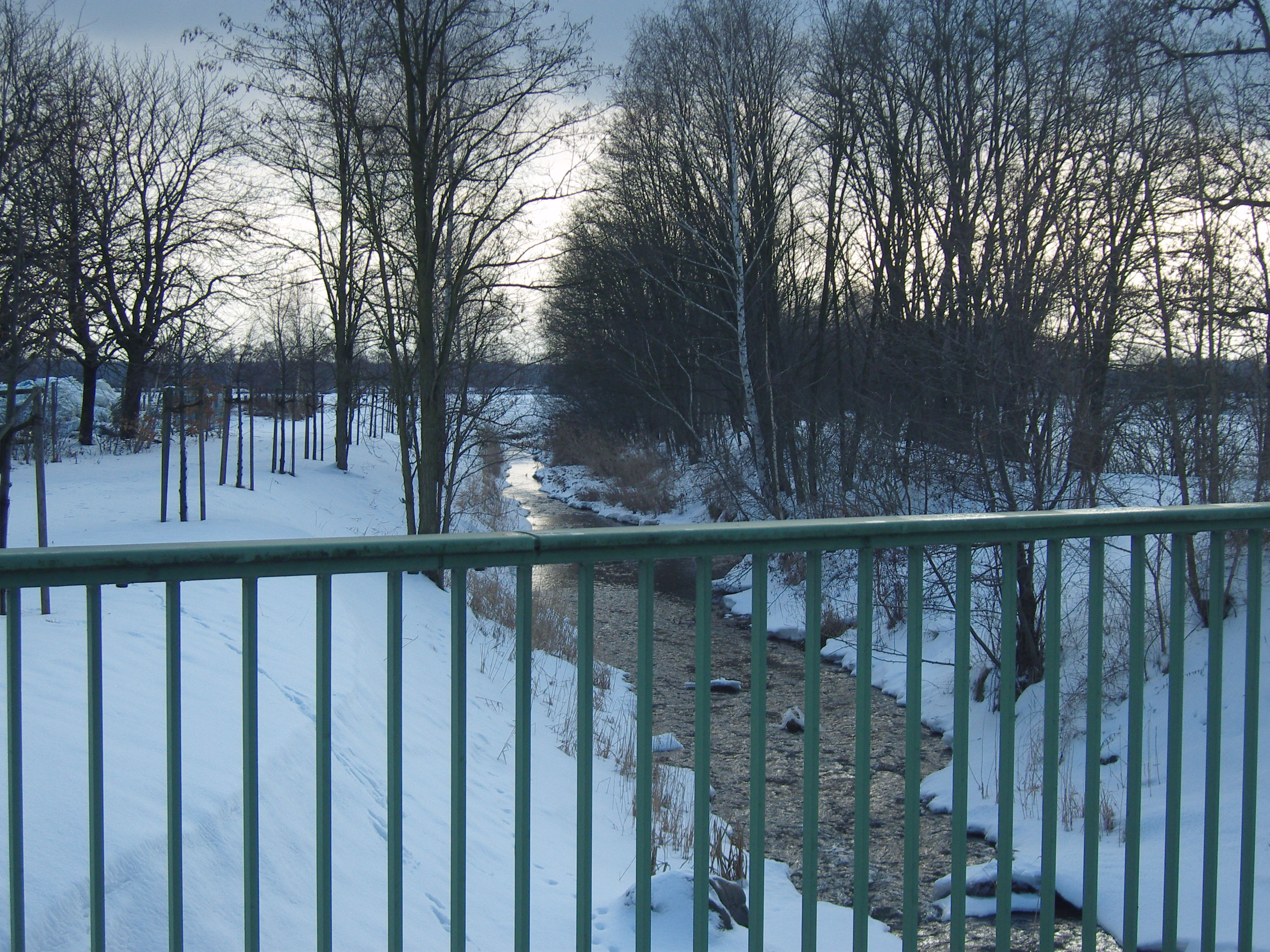

Location
- Country: Germany
- States: Brandenburg

Physical characteristics
- Mouth
  - location: Schwarze Elster
  - coordinates: 51.4631°N 13.8861°E

Basin features
- Progression: Black Elster→ Elbe→ North Sea

The Pößnitz is a river of Brandenburg, Germany. It flows into the Black Elster near Ruhland.

== See also ==
- List of rivers of Brandenburg
