= Königsbrück-Ruhland Heaths =

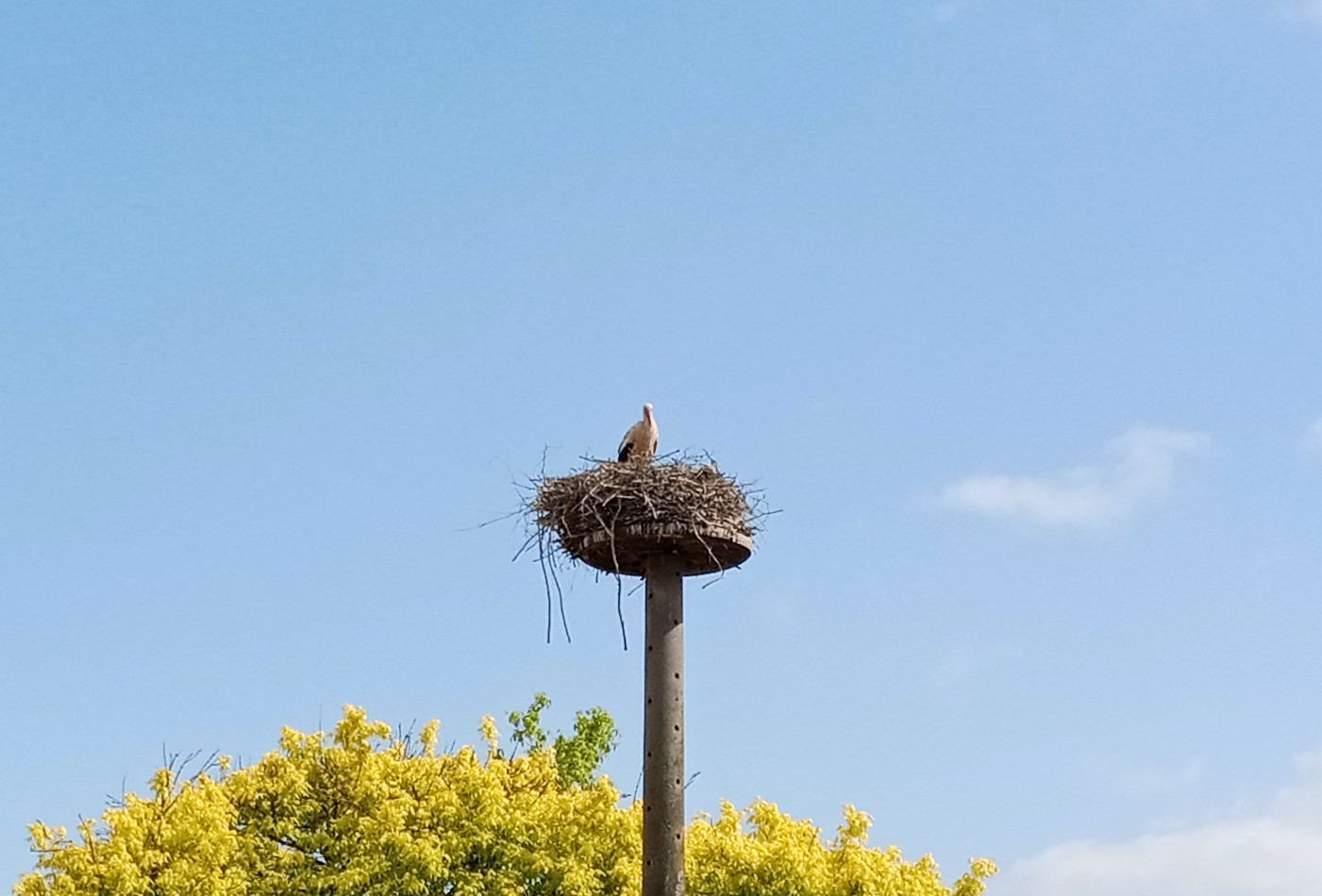
Stork's nest in Bělno (Biehlen), May 2023

The Königsbrück-Ruhland Heaths (German: Königsbrück-Ruhlander Heiden; Upper Sorbian: Kinsporko-Rólanska hola; Lower Sorbian: Kinsporko-Rolanska góla) are a natural region in Saxony and in Brandenburg. They are located around the two towns that give the heathlands their name: Königsbrück and Ruhland, that, although in two different German states, are historically part of Upper Lusatia and represent border towns of that region. To the west is the Großenhainer Pflege, to the east the Upper Lusatian Heath and Pond Landscape. In the south they interleave with the West Lusatian Hill Country and Uplands.

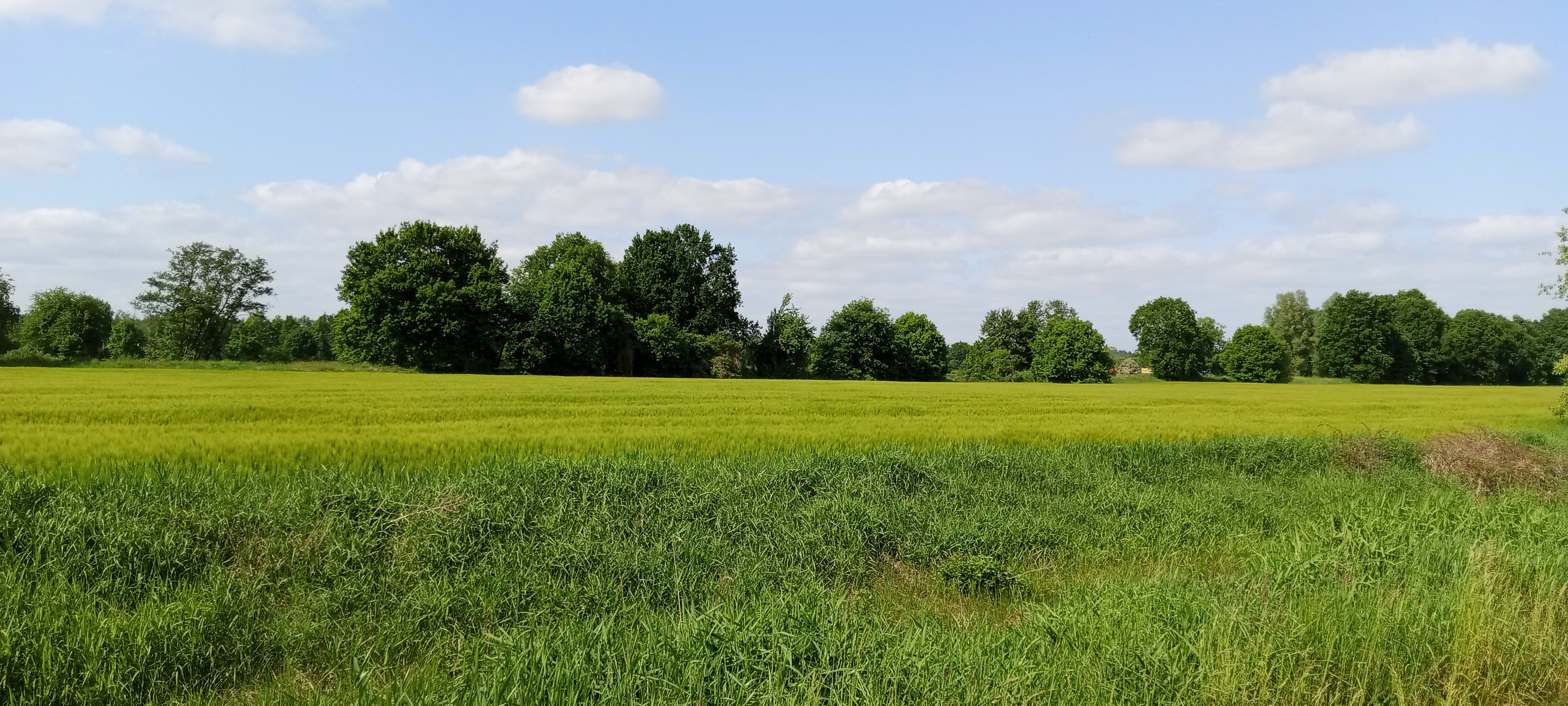
Ruhlander Heide, Elster floodplain near Biehlen (Bělno), approx. 1.5 km east of Ruhland railway station.
