= Linda Wenzel =

German ISIL member (born 2000)

- Born: 2000 (age 25–26); Saxony, Germany
- Other name: Linda W.
- Criminal charges: Membership in Islamic State; Illegal entry into Iraq
- Criminal penalty: 6 years imprisonment
- Criminal status: Incarcerated
- Spouse: Abu Usama al-Shisani (m. 2016; died 2016)
- Military career
- Allegiance: Islamic State
- Nickname: Belle of Mosul
- Unit: Al-Khansaa Brigade
- Conflicts: Battle of Mosul

Linda Wenzel (born 2000), identified in Germany as Linda W., is a German-born Al-Khansaa Brigade member for the Islamic State, who was captured by Iraqi troops during the Battle of Mosul, and was convicted of joining IS and entering Iraq illegally. She was nicknamed the Belle of Mosul.

== Personal life ==
Wenzel was born into a Christian family and grew up in the small German town of Pulsnitz, near Dresden and the Czech border, sharing a house with her mother and step-father. Wenzel moved to Pulsnitz following her mother's divorce. She attended the local Ernst-Rietschel comprehensive school and was particularly interested in mathematics, chemistry, and physics.

== Radicalization ==
In the beginning of 2016 classmates of Wenzel noticed a change in her behavior, when Wenzel starting listening to Arabic music and asked the headmaster for permission to wear a headscarf at school. In the spring of 2016 Wenzel told her parents of her growing interest of Islam, but did not reveal that she had converted and had become a Muslim. During Ramadan, she told her family she was on a diet. Her parents accepted her interests, saying "we didn’t think anything of it, and even bought her a copy of the Qur'an". Wenzel had apparently been approached by Islamists online, who convinced her to convert. However, according to the mayor of Pulsnitz, the school was aware of the conversion months before, and the school principal talked to the parents about it.

According to Wenzel, she was groomed online by a Jordanian teenager named Fatema who convinced her to convert to Islam and introduced her future husband, former IS fighter Abu Usama al-Shisani, whom she subsequently married via a phone conversation.

On Friday 1 July 2016, she told her mother she would be back on the following Sunday at 4 o'clock, feigning spending the weekend at a friend's house. However, the friend knew nothing of Wenzel's whereabouts. Hidden under the mattress in her room police later found receipts for two tickets from Dresden to Frankfurt and from Frankfurt to Istanbul that were purchased with fake authorization from her mother's account and her mother's passport.

== Islamic State ==
Arriving in Syria, she married a Chechen fighter serving the Islamic State, after which she traveled to Syria and then onward to Mosul to fight for the Islamic State, apparently before the October 2016 start of the Battle of Mosul. Her husband was killed in the beginning of the Battle of Mosul. Some have speculated that she may have served as a sniper, and was alleged to have admitted that she killed Iraqi soldiers. During the siege of Mosul she suffered a gunshot wound to her left thigh, and an additional wound to her right knee from a helicopter attack.

Wenzel was also believed to have been a member of the Al-Khansaa Brigade, which is responsible for enforcing the Islamic State's Islamic morality code, inflicting punishments such as whipping for Sharia violations such as women wearing makeup or failing to cover themselves in accordance to the Islamic State's standards.

On 18 July 2017, she was captured in Mosul by Iraqi troops along with four other German women. She had a malnourished baby boy, who is presumed to be her son, with her at the time. Due to her inability to converse in Arabic, Iraqi troops had at first mistaken her for a Yazidi woman, despite having refused any help offered by the Iraqi army. Footage of her capture, in which she was seen screaming and crying as she was being dragged by Iraqi forces, was disseminated a couple of weeks following her capture.

On 15 December 2017, Wenzel was able to meet with her family in Baghdad while awaiting trial. On 22 May 2018, Wenzel was sentenced to 5 years in prison.

== Captivity in Iraq ==
Wenzel and three other German women were formally charged by Iraqi authorities. Subsequently, German diplomats have attempted to avert death penalty charges and sentencing for Wenzel, and were reportedly confident in their ability to avert such a sentence while saying she would be expected to serve a long jail sentence. However, Iraqi then-Prime Minister Haider al-Abadi said on 18 September 2017 that Wenzel may face the death penalty by hanging, as:

You know teenagers under certain laws, they are accountable for their actions especially if the act is a criminal activity when it amounts to killing innocent people.

— Iraqi then-Prime Minister Haider al-Abadi

Wenzel has denied the charges against her saying that she was a housemaid. According to Wenzel, Islamic State authorities refused her requested return to Germany following the death of her husband, and provided her with a month's $200 widow's allowance.

Under Iraqi law, Wenzel could have been sentenced to death; however the execution would not take place until she reached the age of 22. The media reported on 18 February 2018 that she was sentenced to a prison term of 6 years, including five years for being an IS member and a year for entering Iraq illegally.

== See also ==
- Sabina Selimovic and Samra Kesinovic
- Aqsa Mahmood
- Brides of the Islamic State
- Nora el-Bahty
