= Schweinitzer Fließ =

River in Germany

Location
- Country: Germany
- States: Brandenburg; Saxony-Anhalt

Physical characteristics
- Mouth
  - location: Black Elster
  - coordinates: 51.7904°N 13.0119°E

Basin features
- Progression: Black Elster→ Elbe→ North Sea

Schweinitzer Fließ is a river in Brandenburg and Saxony-Anhalt, Germany. It flows into the Schwarze Elster near Jessen (Elster).

== See also ==
- List of rivers of Brandenburg
- List of rivers of Saxony-Anhalt
