= West Lusatian Hill Country and Uplands =

Natural region in Saxony, Germany

Coordinates: 51°13′40″N 14°16′05″E

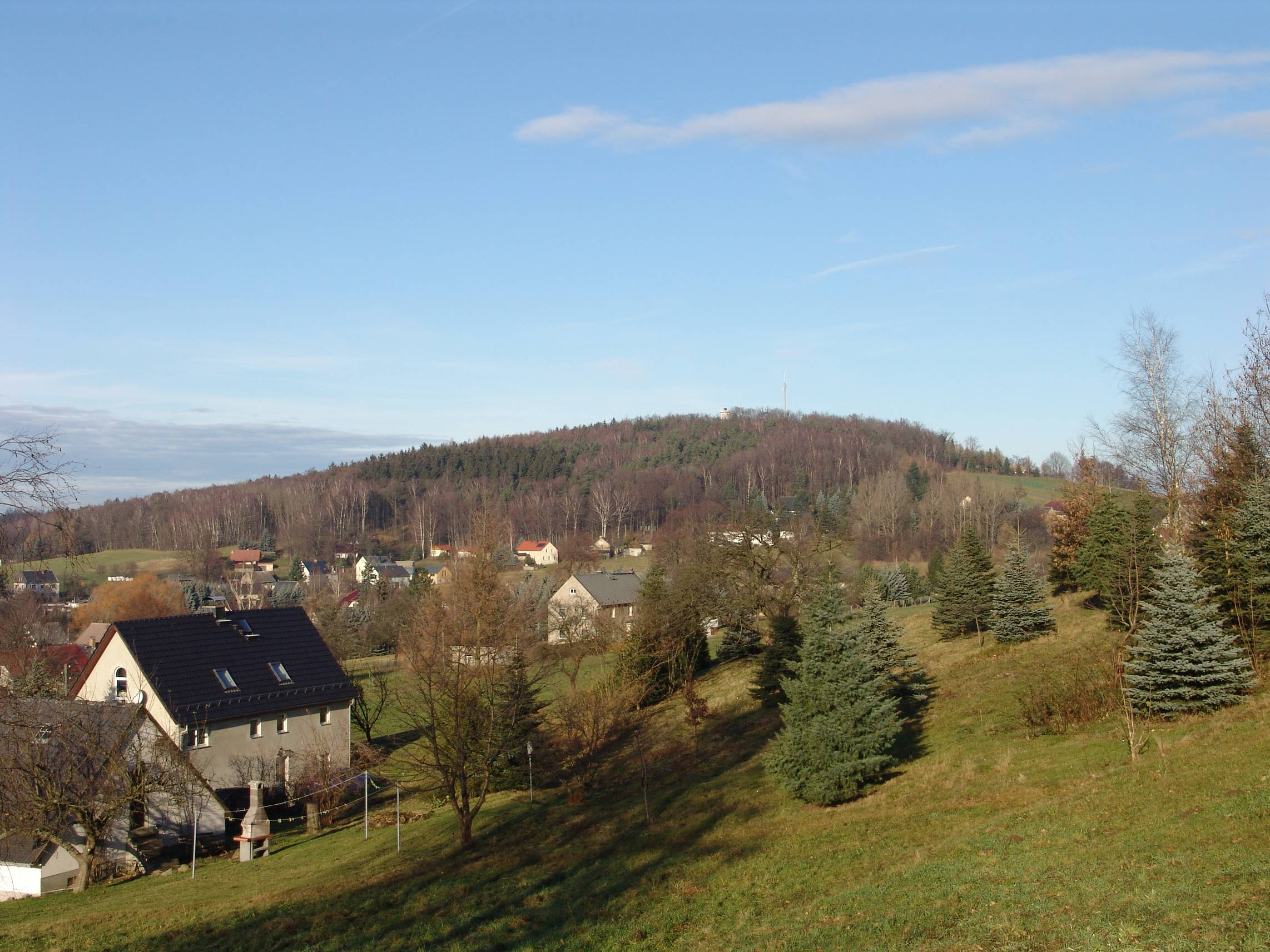
Ohorn and the Schwedenstein

The West Lusatian Hill Country and Uplands (German: Westlausitzer Hügel- und Bergland; Upper Sorbian: Zapadołužiska pahórčina a hórski kraj), sometimes just the West Lusatian Hills, is a natural region in Saxony. It is divided into the West Lusatian Foothills (Westlausitzer Vorberge; Zapadołužiske zawěški) in the east and the Lusatian Plateau (Lausitzer Platte; Łužiske Wysokornina) in the west and forms the westernmost extremity of the Sudetes range.

== Location and boundaries ==
The West Lusatian Foothills form the northwestern declivity of the Lusatian Highlands. They extend between Saxon Switzerland in the south, the Upper Lusatian Highlands in the south east, the Upper Lusatian Gefilde in the north east, the Upper Lusatian Heath and Pond Landscape in the northeast and the Königsbrück-Ruhland Heaths in the northwest.

Immediately to the west and also south of the Königsbrück-Ruhland Heath they are adjoined by the Lusatian Plateau. To the north they are bounded by the Großenhainer Pflege, to the south and southwest by the Dresden Basin and just touch Saxon Switzerland in the extreme southeast.

=== Settlements ===
The settlements of the West Lusatian Hill Country and Uplands do not just included those normally counted as part of Upper Lusatia, but also those to the west and south of Upper Lusatia that belong, culturally and historically to other lands, but which still lie geologically on the Lusatian Plateau. The following are some of the settlements that lie within this region:

- Kamenz, on the northeastern edge on the border with the Upper Lusatian Gefilde and the Upper Lusatian Heath and Pond Landscape, is the centre of West Lusatia, which is not identical with the natural region, however.
- Elstra, a small town south of Kamenz, on the territory of which are two of the more striking hills of the West Lusatian Uplands: the Schwarzenberg and the Hochstein
- Radeberg in Radeberg Land is not always counted as part of Upper Lusatia.
- Sebnitz does not belong to Upper Lusatian and in the consciousness of the local population is usually seen as part of the natural region of Saxon Switzerland, which begins a few kilometres to the south. From the viewpoint of natural regional mapping the town borough is part of the West Lusatian Hill Country and Uplands due to its natural characteristics.
- Dresden's portion of the West Lusatian Hill Country and Uplands is exclusively based on natural and landscape considerations and is found in the northeast and east of the city's territory: the Dresden Heath and the Schönfeld Upland, which are part of Radeberg Land. The Dresden Elbe Slopes mark the sharp transition to the Dresden Basin south of the hill country and uplands. At this point the West Lusatian Hill Country and Uplands form the northern shoulder of a fault-block trough.

== Geography and Nature ==
The Upper Lusatian Highlands to the east give way to various hills and ridges in this heterogeneous natural region.

Ridges between 350 and 450 metres in height dominate the landscape in only a few places. These ridges are mostly isolated, occasionally linked with one another within hilly areas with altitudes between 250 and 300 metres and also embedded within plains.

In the central and eastern part of the area granodiorite is the dominant bedrock, which was quarried as Lusatian granite in many places. In the north, greywacke prevails but, in the west, by contrast the main rock is syenite. Younger sediments cover this bedrock. In the east, loess derivatives and sandy loess dominate whilst, to the west, sands and quicksands are to the fore.

Precipitation varies between 650 millimetres on the western edge of the area up to 900 millimetres in the hill country. The mean annual temperatures fall from the West Lusatian Plateau around Moritzburg (8.5 °C) to below 7.5 °C on the hill ridge to the east.

The potential natural vegetation is mainly the high colline and submontane Wood-rush-Oak-Beech wood.
