= Kamenz =

Kamenz Kamjenc
- Town
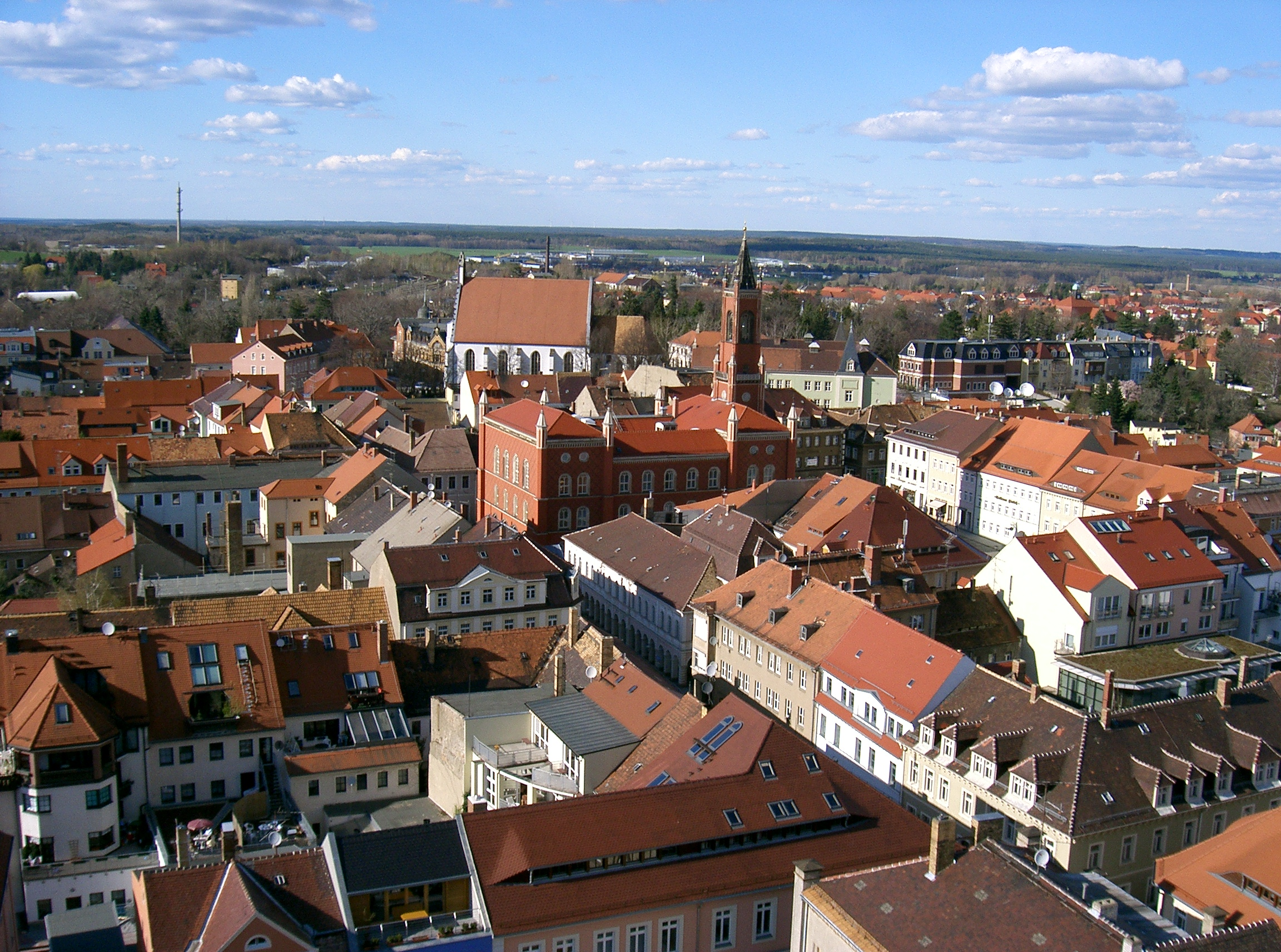
- Old town

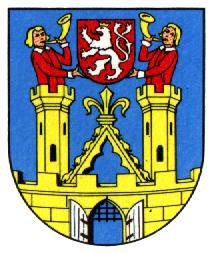
- Coat of arms

- Location of Kamenz within Bautzen district
- Interactive map of Kamenz
- Location within Germany Location within Saxony
- Coordinates: 51°16′N 14°6′E
- Country: Germany
- State: Saxony
- District: Bautzen

Government
  - Mayor (2018–2025): Roland Dantz (Ind.)

Area
  - Total: 98.3 km^{2} (38.0 sq mi)
- Elevation: 173 m (568 ft)

Population (2025-12-31)
  - Total: 16,878
  - Density: 172/km^{2} (445/sq mi)
- Demonym(s): German: Kamenzer; Upper Sorbian: Kamjenčan (m.), Kamjenčanka (f.)
- Time zone: UTC+01:00 (CET)
  - Summer (DST): UTC+02:00 (CEST)
- Postal codes: 01917, 01920
- Dialling codes: 03578
- Vehicle registration: BZ, BIW, HY, KM
- Website: www.kamenz.de

Kamenz (German, pronounced [ˈkaːmɛnts]) or Kamjenc (Upper Sorbian, pronounced [ˈkamʲɛnts]) is a town (Große Kreisstadt) in the district of Bautzen in Saxony, Germany. Until 2008 it was the administrative seat of Kamenz District. The town is known as the birthplace of the philosopher and poet Gotthold Ephraim Lessing. It lies north-east of the major city of Dresden.

== Geography ==
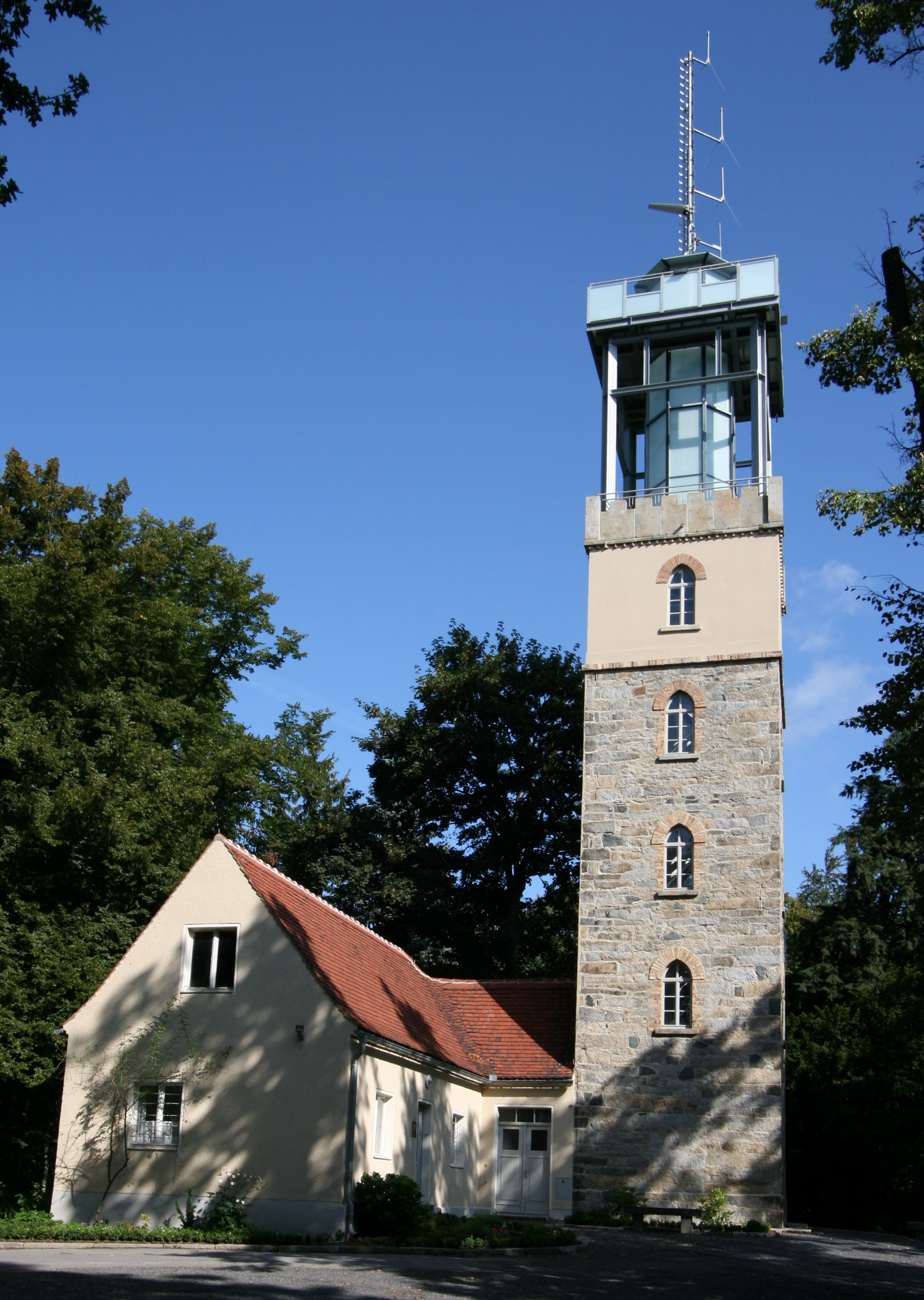
Lessing Tower

This small town is located in the west of the Upper Lusatia historic region (West Lusatia), about 40 km (25 mi) northeast of Dresden and about 30 km (19 mi) northwest of Bautzen. Situated on the Black Elster river, between the West Lusatian Hills and the Lusatian Highlands rising in the south, the town was built on greywacke and granite rocks which were mined here for centuries. Kamenz railway station is the terminus of Lübbenau–Kamenz and Kamenz–Pirna railway lines. It is served by Regionalbahn trains from Dresden Hauptbahnhof, operated by the Städtebahn Sachsen. The Hutberg hill west of the town centre, at an elevation of 293 m (961 ft), is the site of an extended landscape park laid out in 1893. It is known for its major rhododendron and azalea collections flowering at Pentecost. In 1864 the Lessing Tower was erected on the hilltop, offering a panoramic view over the West Lusatian lands and the Upper Lusatian Heath and Pond Landscape in the north. About 32% of the nature in former Kamenz District is under protection, including a network of routes for riding by bicycle and hiking.

=== Divisions ===
The town Kamenz consists of Thale Kamenz and the following Ortschaften or municipal divisions:

- Bernbruch
- Biehla
- Brauna (incl. Liebenau, Petershain, Rohrbach and Schwosdorf)
- Cunnersdorf (incl. Hausdorf and Schönbach)
- Deutschbaselitz/Němske Pazlicy
- Jesau/Jěžow
- Lückersdorf-Gelenau (Lückersdorf, Gelenau and Hennersdorf)
- Thonberg/Hlinowc
- Wiesa/Brěznja
- Zschornau-Schiedel (Zschornau/Čornow and Schiedel)

== History ==
The settlement arose in the late 12th century, when a fortress was erected at the location of today's old town, in order to secure the junction of the medieval Via Regia trade route with the Black Elster river. From here, the Via Regia offered important transport links from the Low Countries up to Silesia.

In 1225, written records first mentioned the town; Kamenz became an independent city in 1319, when Holy Roman Emperor Louis IV enfeoffed the West Lusatian lands to the Luxembourg king John of Bohemia. In 1346, the citizens joined the Lusatian League for protection against robber barons and to maintain public peace (Landfrieden). The town was nevertheless besieged and finally occupied by Hussite forces in 1429, who also devastated the nearby town of Wittichenau before they marched against Bautzen. In 1469, along with the Lusatian League, the town recognized the rule of King Matthias Corvinus and passed to Hungary, and in 1490 it returned to the Czech Crown, then under the rule of Polish Prince Vladislaus II. In 1493, King Vladislaus II of Bohemia had a Franciscan monastery established north of the Kamenz town walls, dedicated to Saint Anne in 1512.

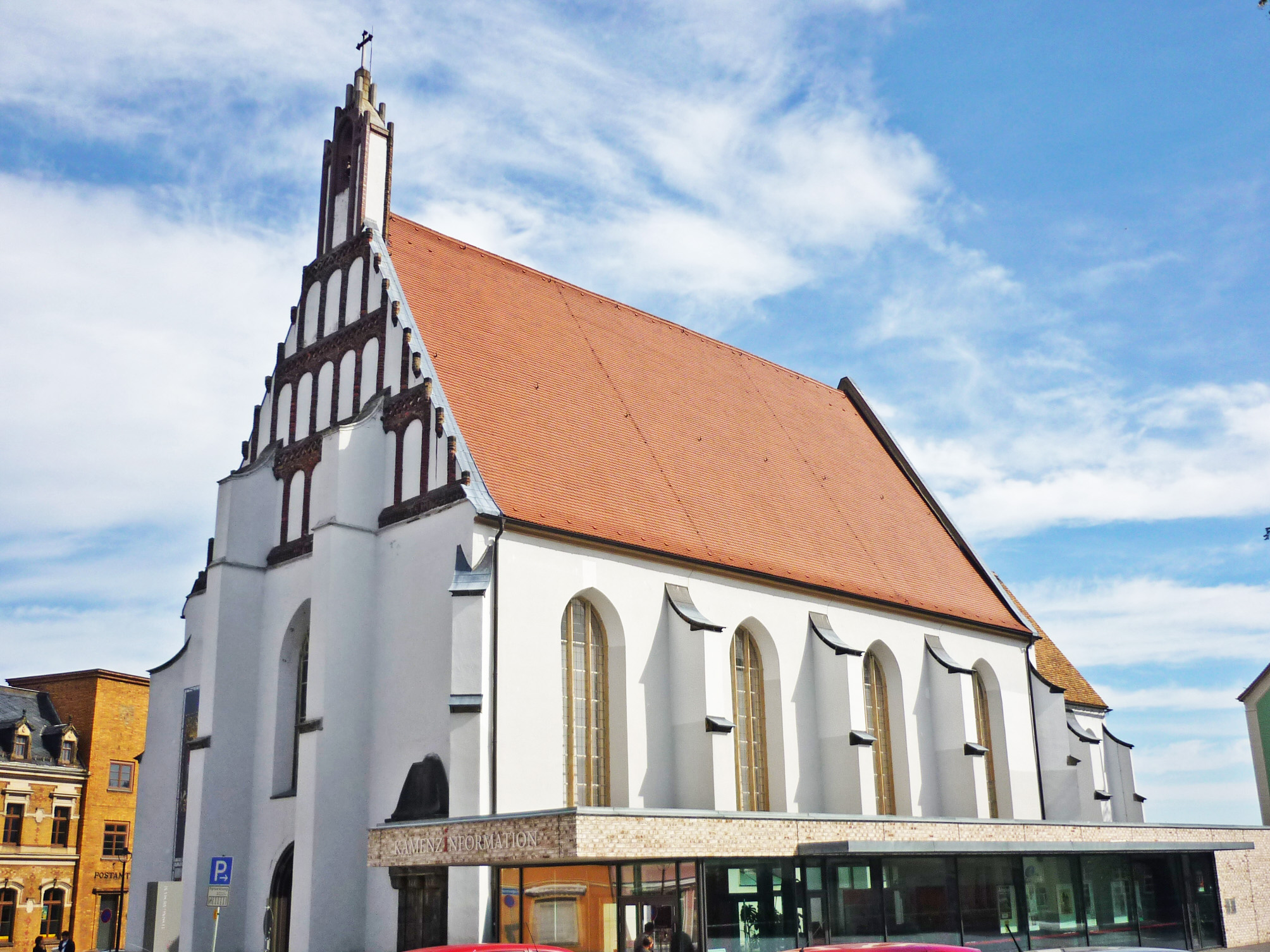
St Anna Church and Museum

Kamenz citizens officially turned Protestant in 1536. In the Schmalkaldic War of 1546/47, the Upper Lusatian towns refused to support the troops of the Habsburg emperor Ferdinand I against the Protestant princes and were penalised with the loss of numerous privileges. The Franciscan convent finally dissolved in 1564.

With the 1635 Peace of Prague, the Lusatias passed from the Bohemian Crown to the Electorate of Saxony. Several witch-hunts are documented in the 17th century. In 1707 a fire destroyed large parts of the old town. A second major fire on 4 and 5 August 1842 destroyed much of the city.

In 1896, Kamenz became garrison town of the Königlich Sächsisches Reserve-Infanterie-Regiment Nr. 242, part of the German 53rd Reserve Division. During World War II a subcamp of Gross-Rosen concentration camp was located in the town from 1944 to 1945, where forced labourers worked for a Daimler-Benz aircraft engine factory. The airfield northeast of the town was used by Luftwaffe Schlachtgeschwader 2 and Sturzkampfgeschwader 77 units.

After the war, the town became part of the Soviet occupation zone and East Germany. Until 1990, an officer candidate school of the East German Air Force Staff (Offiziershochschule Franz Mehring) was located at the Kamenz Airfield. The former municipality Schönteichen was merged into Kamenz in January 2019.

== Politics ==
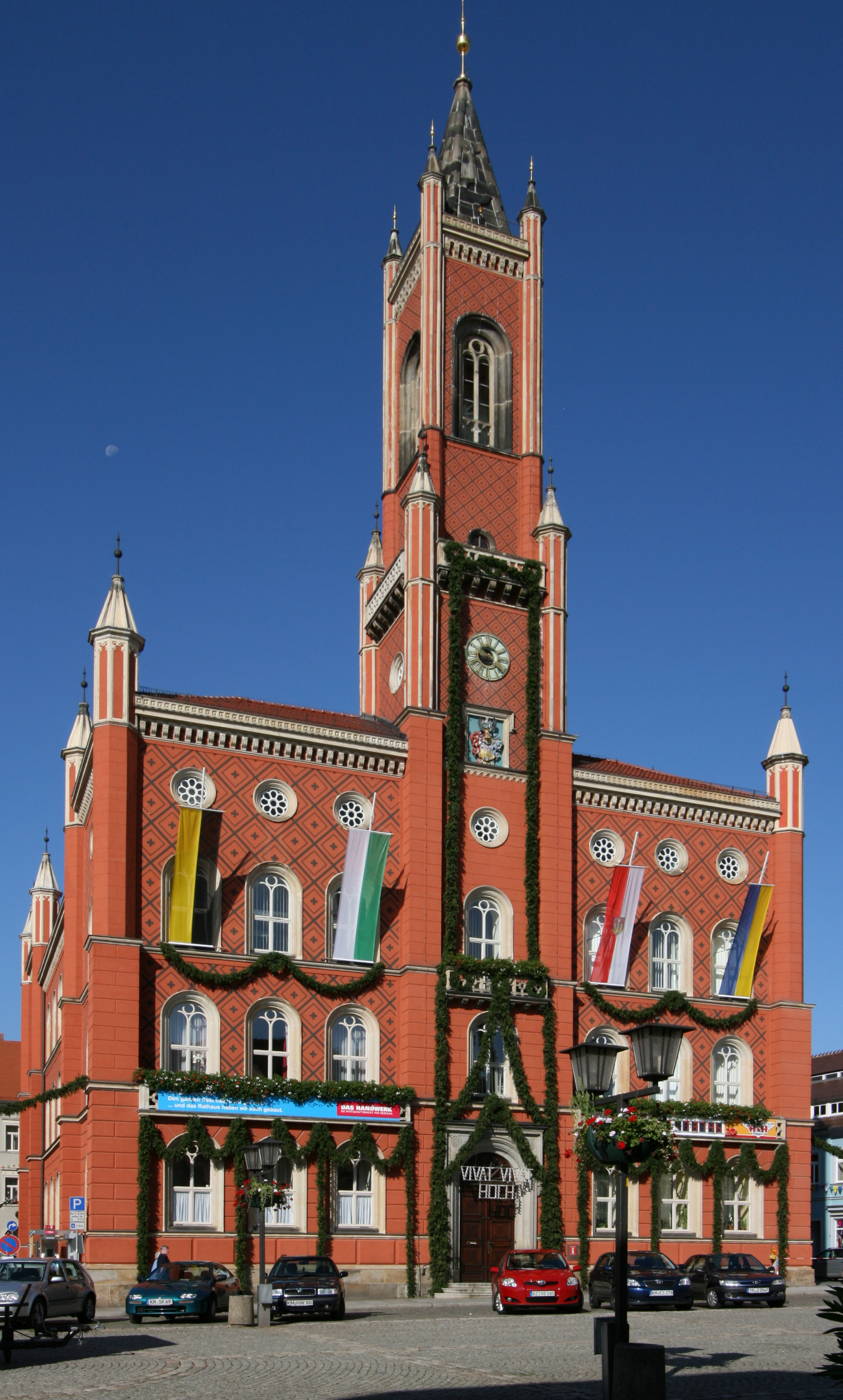
Town hall

Seats in the city council (Stadtrat) as of 2024 local elections:

- Wählervereinigung Kamenz und Ortsteile (Independent): 9
- Alternative for Germany (AfD): 8
- Miteinander für Kamenz (Independent): 4
- Christian Democratic Union of Germany (CDU): 3
- Free Democratic Party: 1
- Alliance '90/The Greens: 1

== Twin towns ==
Kamenz

- Alzey, Germany
- Kolín, Czech Republic
- Karpacz, Poland

== Sights ==
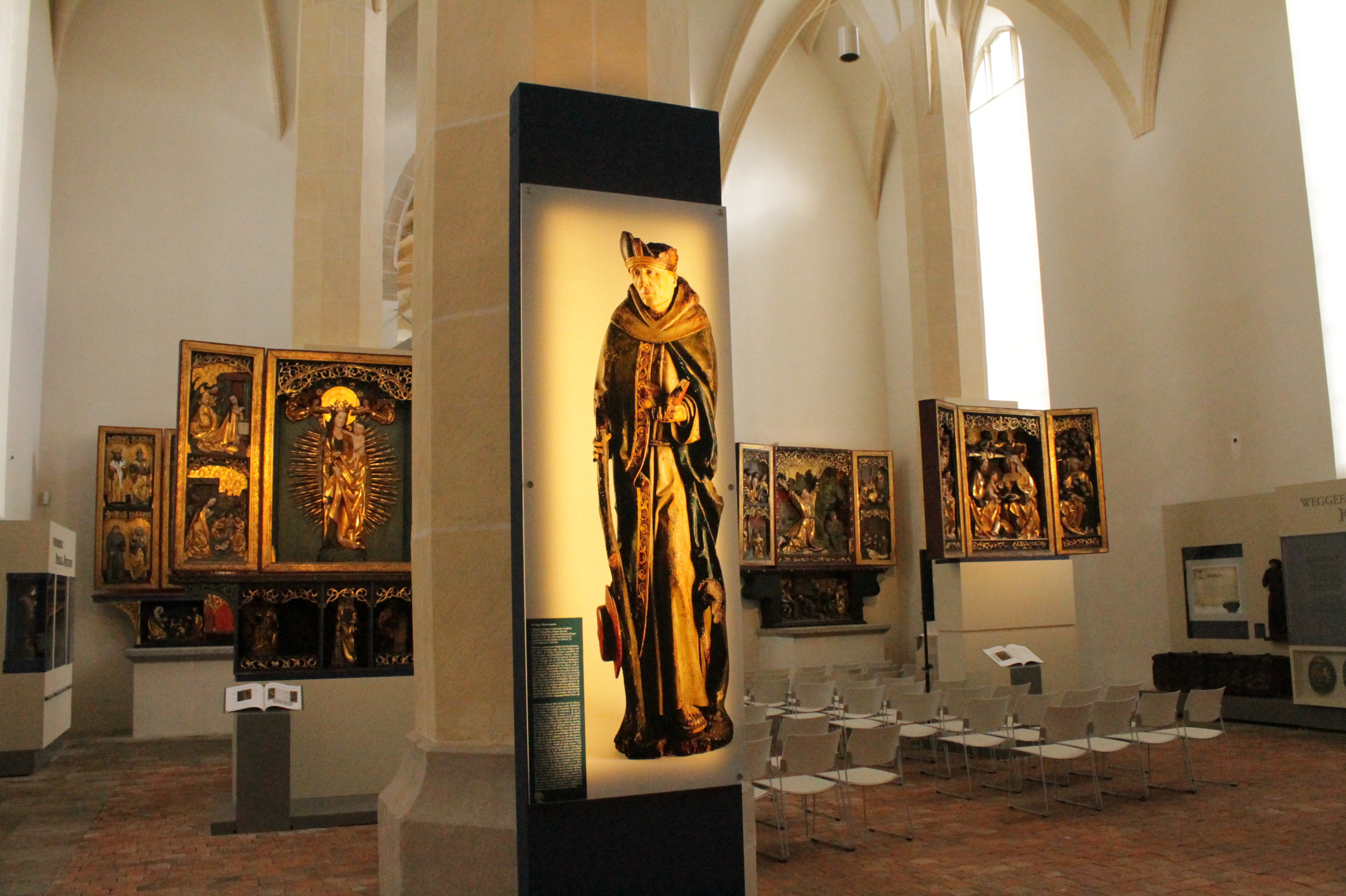
The altarpiece collection in the St Anna Museum in Kamenz

=== Theatre ===
- The municipal theatre (Stadttheater) was re-opened in 1999; it is also used for Kabarett and concert performances
- Within the Hutberg landscape park, an open-air stage for up to 10,000 visitors was built in 1934/35 as a Thingplatz; it is today used for music events.

=== Museums ===
- Lessing Museum, opened in 1931, memorial site and library
- St Anna abbey church and sacred museum (Klosterkirche und Sakralmuseum St. Annen), part of the former Franciscan convent, exhibits sacred art of the Kamenz churches - a collection of 16th-century carved timber painted altarpieces
- Museum of West Lusatia (Museum der Westlausitz): various collections on cultural history, archaeology, geology, zoology, and botany of the region.

=== Buildings ===
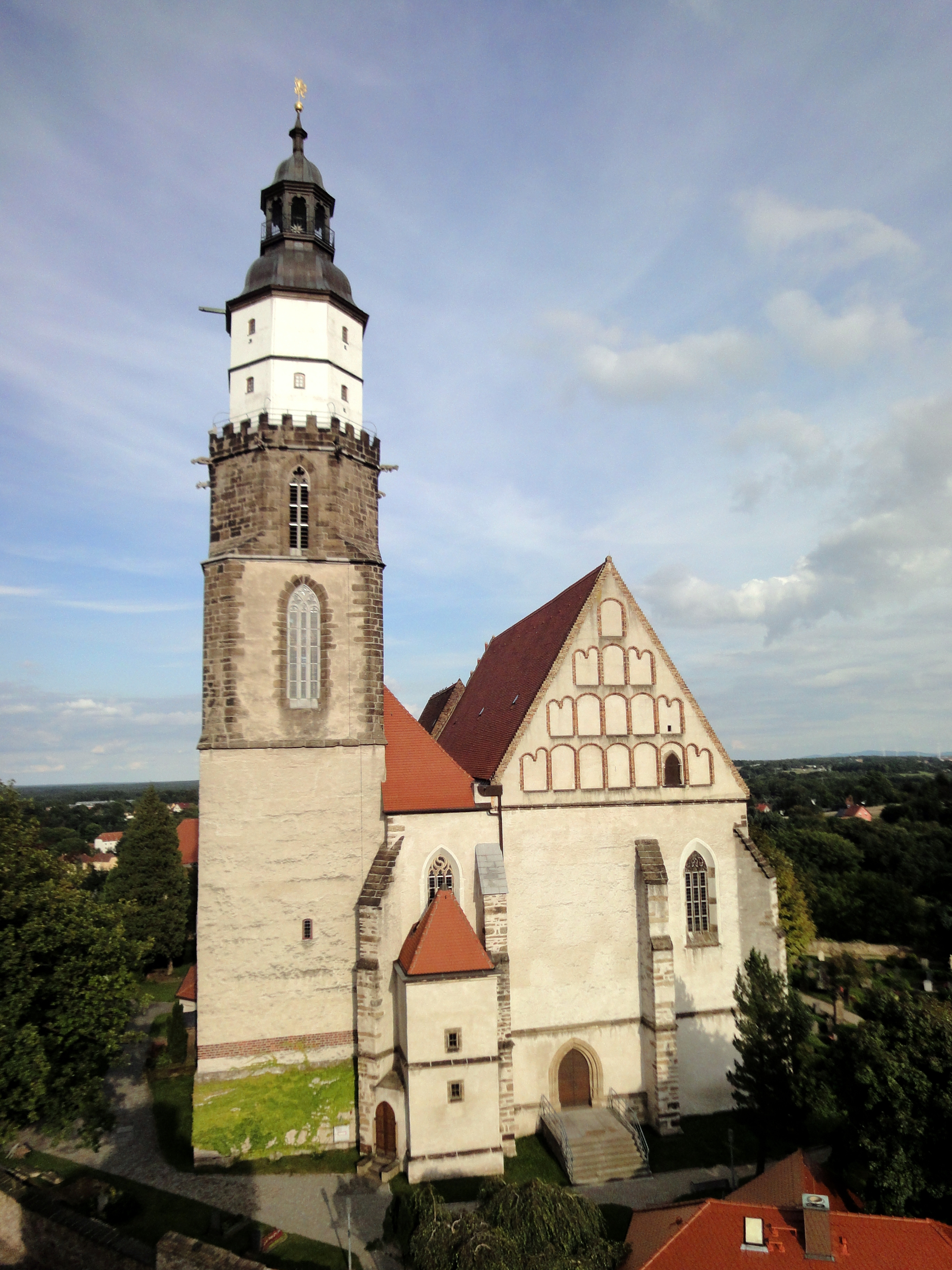
St Mary's Church

- Town hall, built in 1848/49, in an Italian Neo-Renaissance style
- Marketplace with Mannerist Andreas Fountain, erected in 1570
- Roter Turm (red tower), Mönchsmauer (monk wall), and Pichschuppen, all remnants of the medieval town fortification
- The Protestant main church of St Mary was built from 1275 to 1479, in a Late Gothic hall church style; it is the only church built from granite rocks north of the Alps
- The nearby Catechism Church at the town wall was first mentioned in 1358; it was later used for religious services held in the Sorbian language
- The St Anne Abbey Church was finished in 1510, now a museum whose collections include five 16th-century carved wood altarpieces
- The St Just Church on the historic Via Regia road, first mentioned in 1377, contains several mural paintings from about 1400
- The Lessing memorial marks the place of the poet's birth house.

=== Events ===
- Blütenlauf auf dem Hutberg (Run on the Hutberg)
- Lessing Days (every year, January and February)
- Fête de la Musique every year on June 21
- Forstfest (Forest Festival), every year in the week of August 24 on St Bartholomew's Day
- Kamenzer Nasenfest (Nose Festival), Festival with the so-called nose market every year on October 3
- Carnival
- Popular German band Silbermond, originally from the nearby town of Bautzen, have made it a personal tradition to play the final concert of their album tours at Kamenz's Hutbergbühne stadium.

== Notable people ==
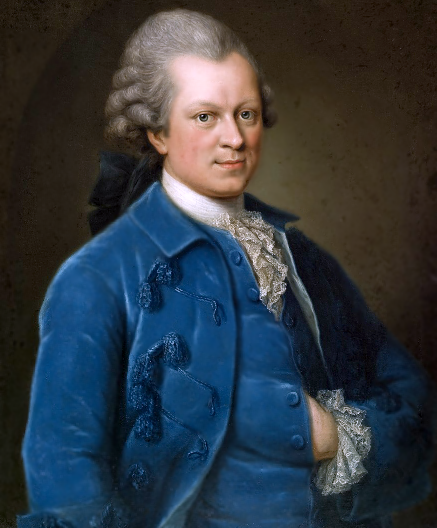
Gotthold Ephraim Lessing 1767/1768

- Andreas Dressler (1530–1604), a highly skilled local artist
- Gotthold Ephraim Lessing (1729–1781), philosopher and poet.
- Gottfried von Erdmannsdorff (1893–1946), German Nazi officer executed for war crimes
- Richard Hauptmann (1899–1936), convicted kidnapper of the Lindbergh baby
- Hans Thamm (1921–2007), choral conductor
- Georg Baselitz (born 1938), painter, born in Deutschbaselitz
- Wolfgang Mager (born 1952), rower, two-time Olympic gold medalist
