= Pulsnitz =

- Town
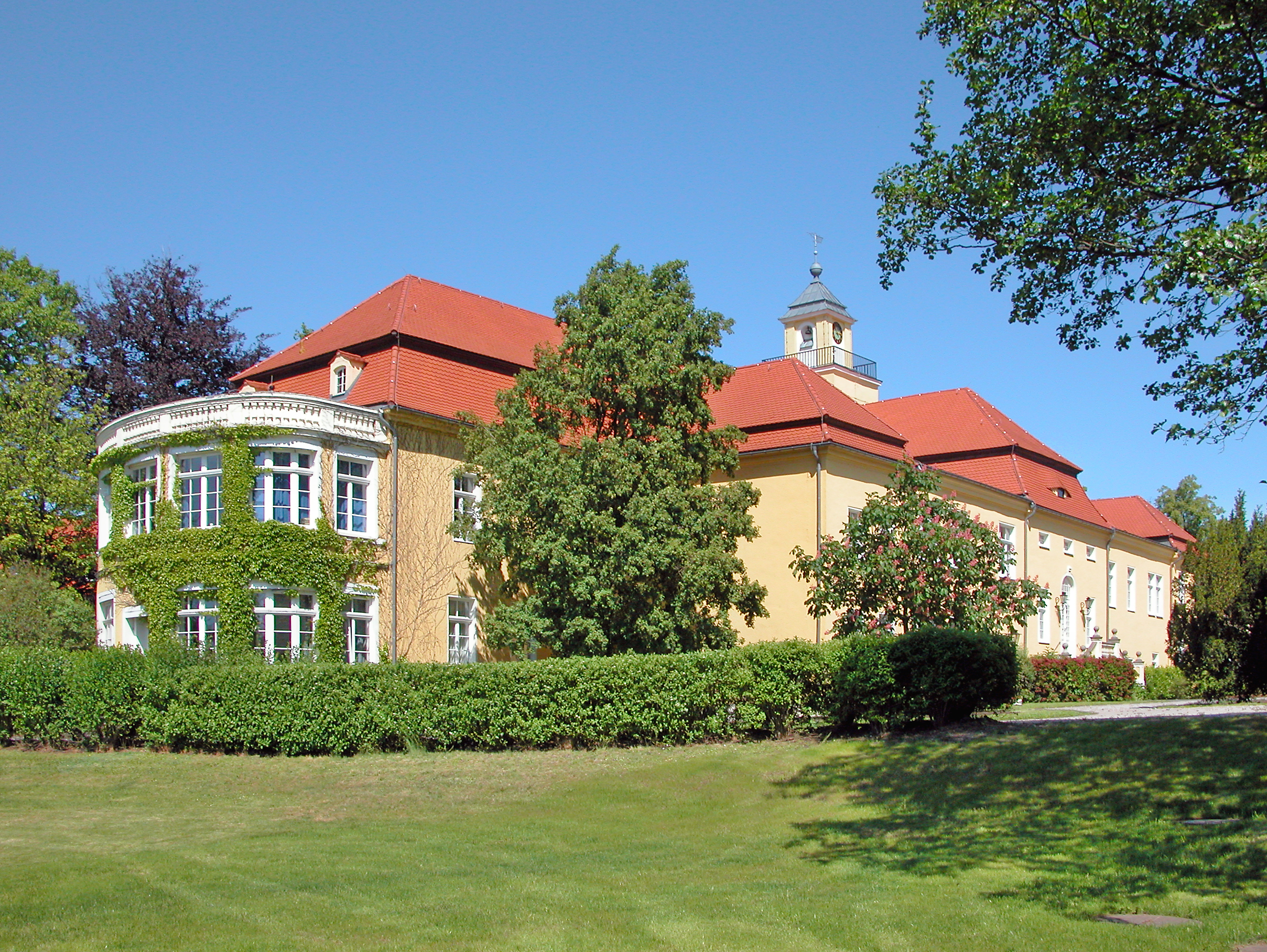
- New Palace in Pulsnitz

- Coat of arms

- Location of Pulsnitz within Bautzen district
- Interactive map of Pulsnitz
- Location within Germany Location within Saxony
- Coordinates: 51°10′54″N 14°0′47″E
- Country: Germany
- State: Saxony
- District: Bautzen
- Subdivisions: 5

Government
  - Mayor (2023–30): Barbara Lüke (Ind.)

Area
  - Total: 26.75 km^{2} (10.33 sq mi)
- Elevation: 290 m (950 ft)

Population (2025-12-31)
  - Total: 7,250
  - Density: 271/km^{2} (702/sq mi)
- Time zone: UTC+01:00 (CET)
  - Summer (DST): UTC+02:00 (CEST)
- Postal codes: 01896
- Dialling codes: 035955
- Vehicle registration: BZ
- Website: www.pulsnitz.de

Pulsnitz (German pronunciation: [ˈpʊlsnɪts]; Upper Sorbian: Połčnica, pronounced [ˈpɔwtʃnʲitsa]) is a town in the district of Bautzen, in the Free State of Saxony, in eastern Germany. It is situated on the small river Pulsnitz, 11 km southwest of Kamenz, and 24 km northeast of the centre of Dresden.

== History ==
Initially a Sorbian stronghold and settlement, it was first mentioned in 1225. It was granted town rights in 1375. It was raided by the Hussites in 1429.

Pulsnitz became famous for its Pfefferkuchen, a type of Christmas cookie, when in 1558 the bakers of Pulsnitz received permission to bake them. Today there are still eight Pfefferküchlereien bakeries. In 1745 the Pfefferküchler Tobias Thomas was known to be practising his craft in Pulsnitz as well as in Toruń, Poland, where the famous Toruń gingerbread were made. Pulsnitz is informally known as Pfefferkuchenstadt meaning "Gingerbread Town".

Other crafts also developed, with a linen weavers' guild founded in 1597, and the first local potter mentioned in 1653.

During the Thirty Years' War of 1618–1648 the town suffered four fires, and in 1633 and 1680 it was hit by epidemics.

The first Protestant missionary to arrive in India, Bartholomäus Ziegenbalg was born in Pulsnitz on July 10, 1682.

During the final stages of World War II, in April 1945, the Polish Second Army captured the town.

The town Pulsnitz absorbed the former municipality Friedersdorf in 1994, and Oberlichtenau in 2009.

== Gallery ==
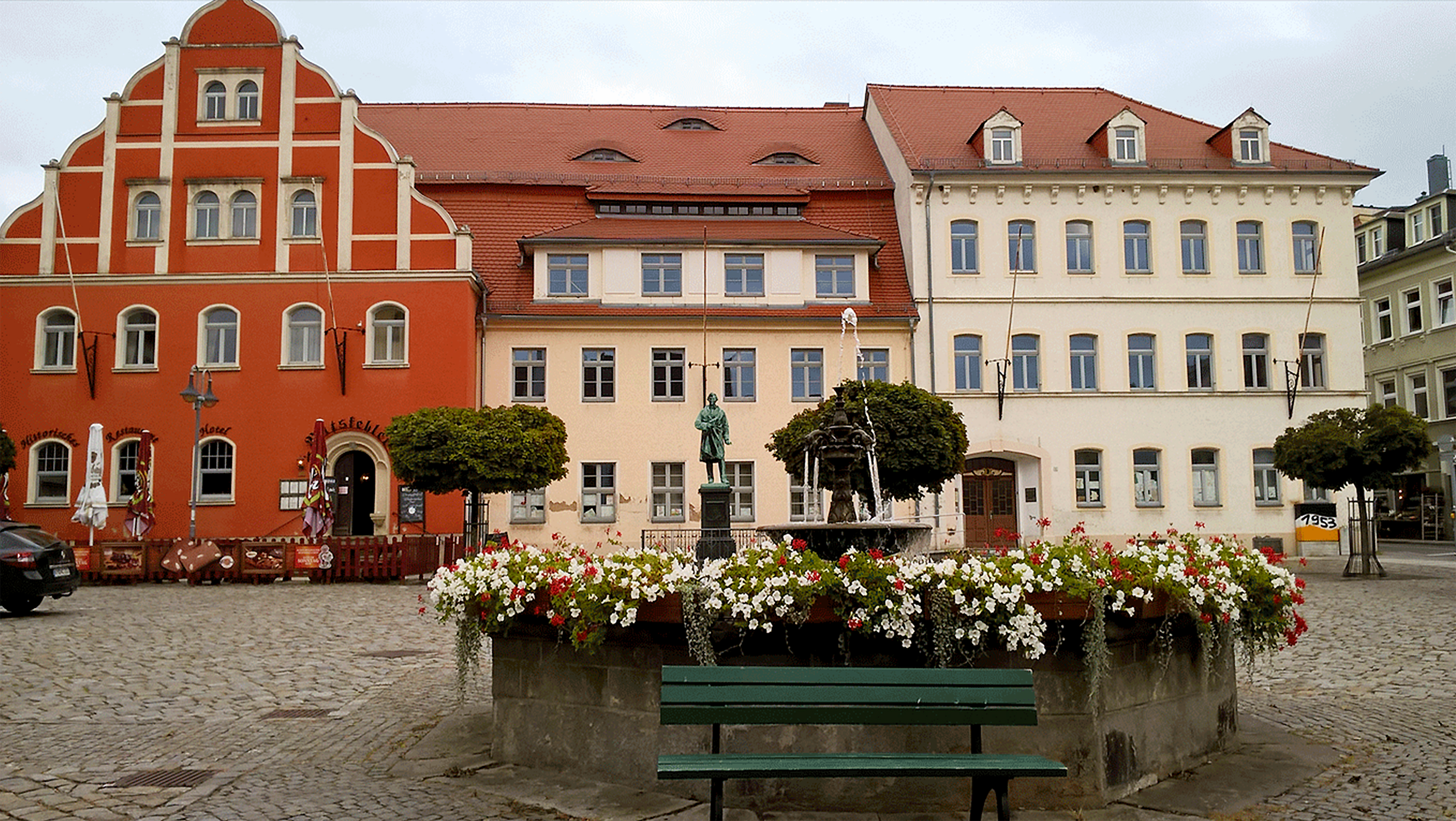
Market square with old town hall

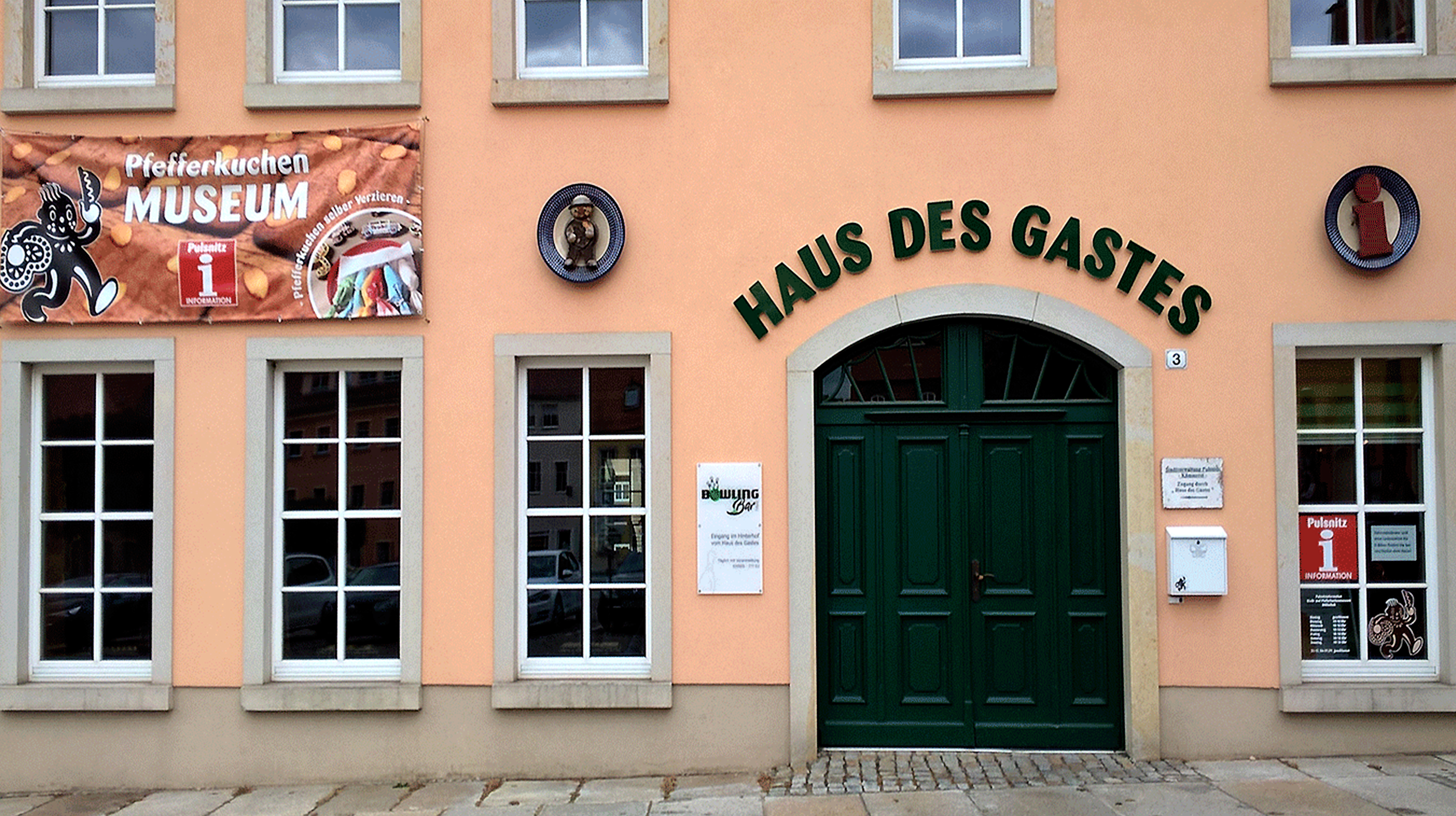
Pepper Cake Museum Pulsnitz - House of the Guest - Market Square

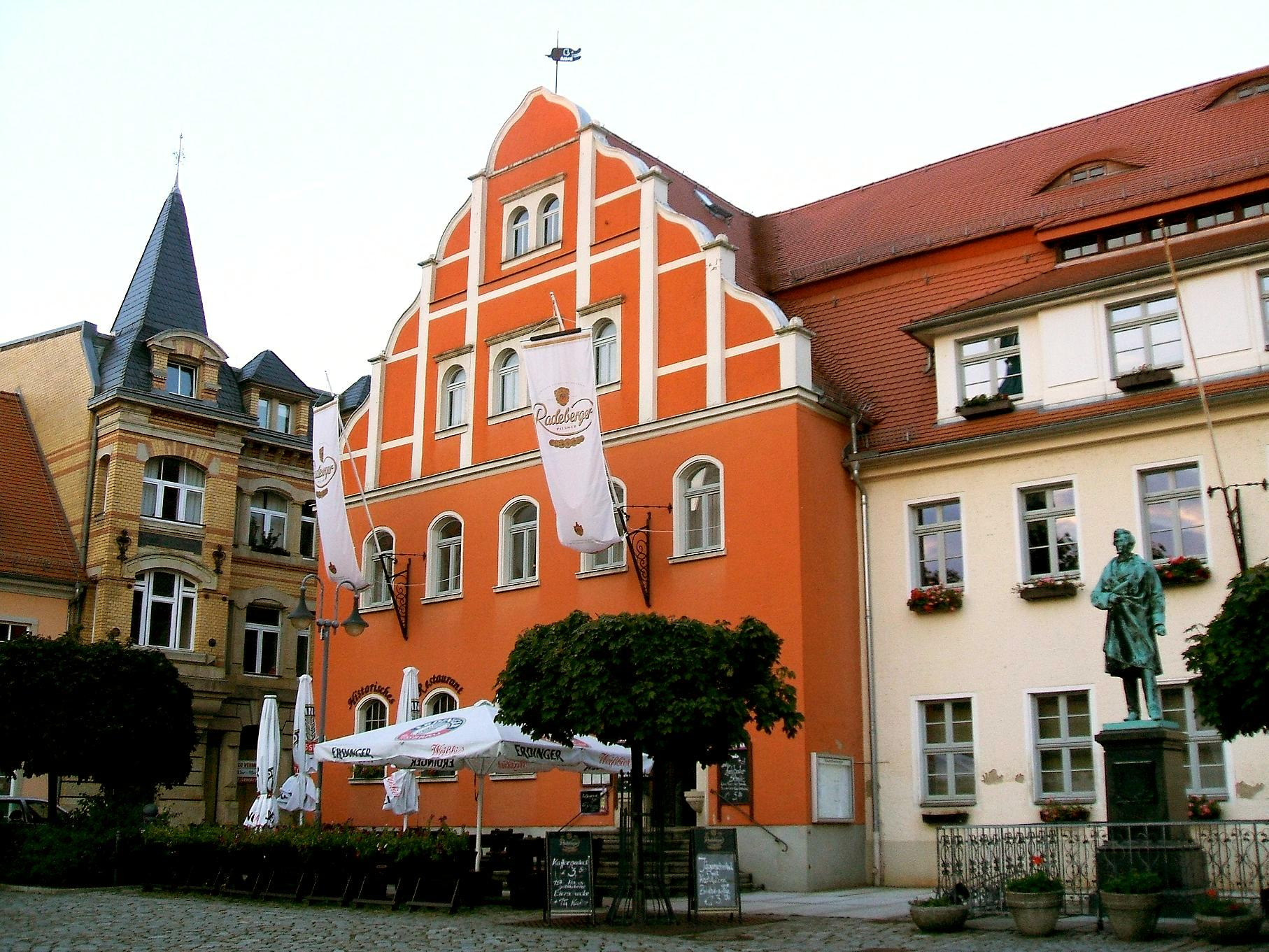
Town hall

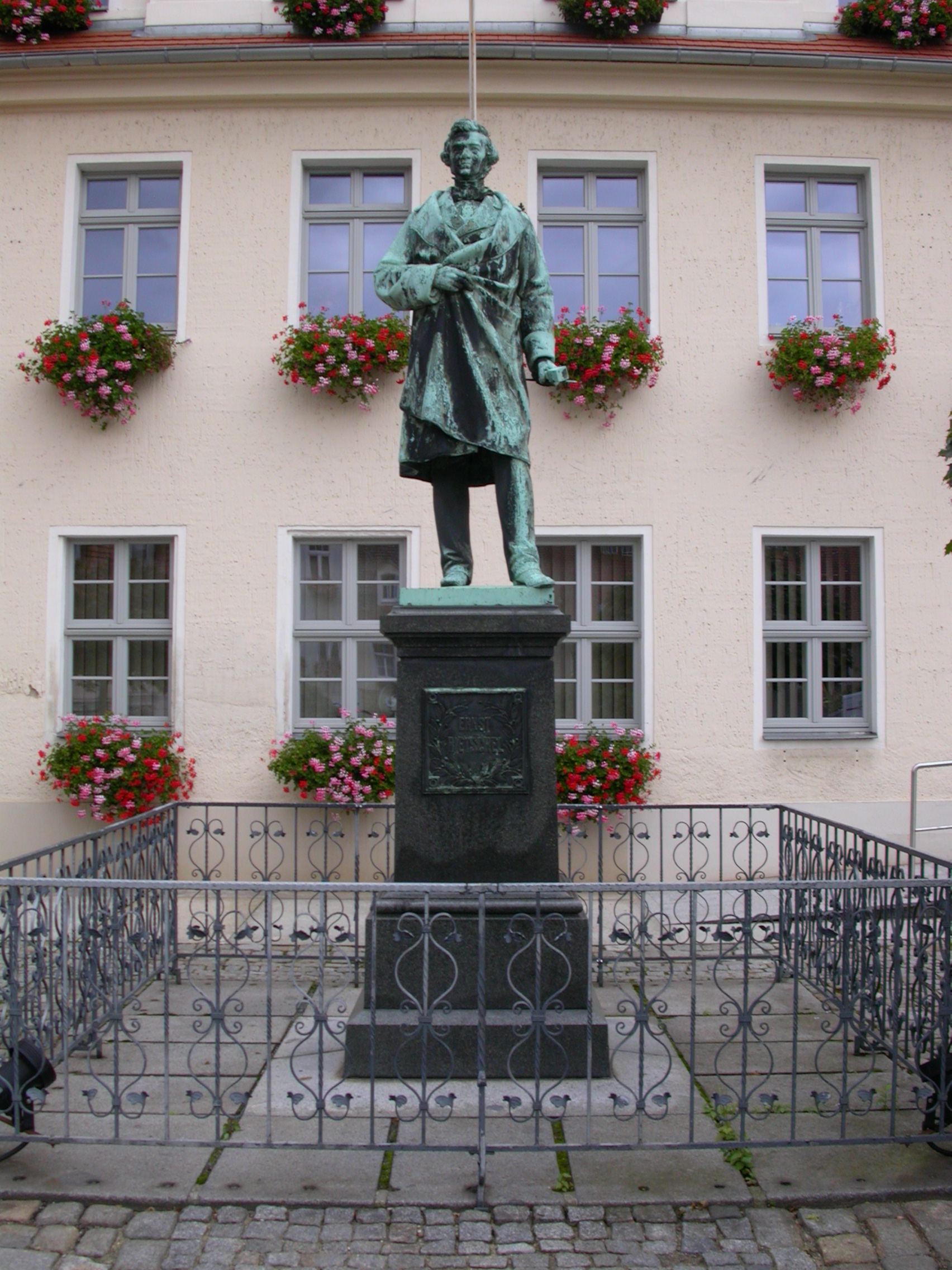
Memorial for Ernst Rietschel

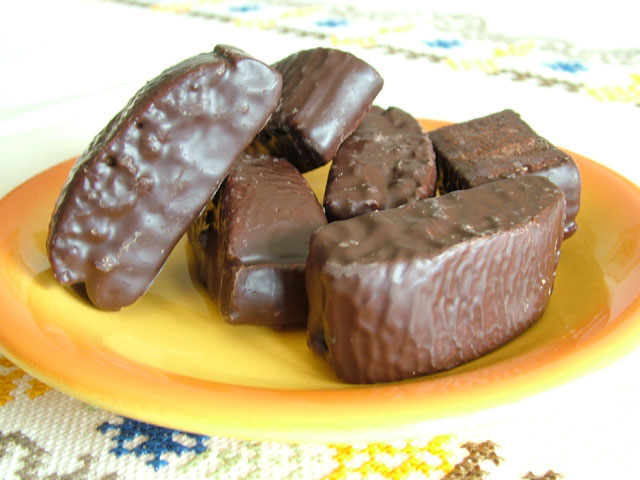
Pulsnitzer Spitzen

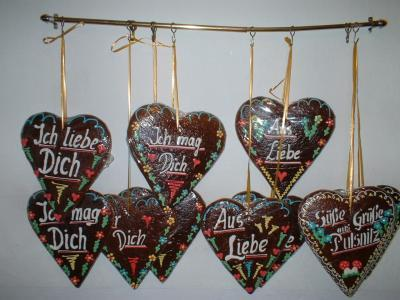
Pulsnitzer Pfefferkuchen

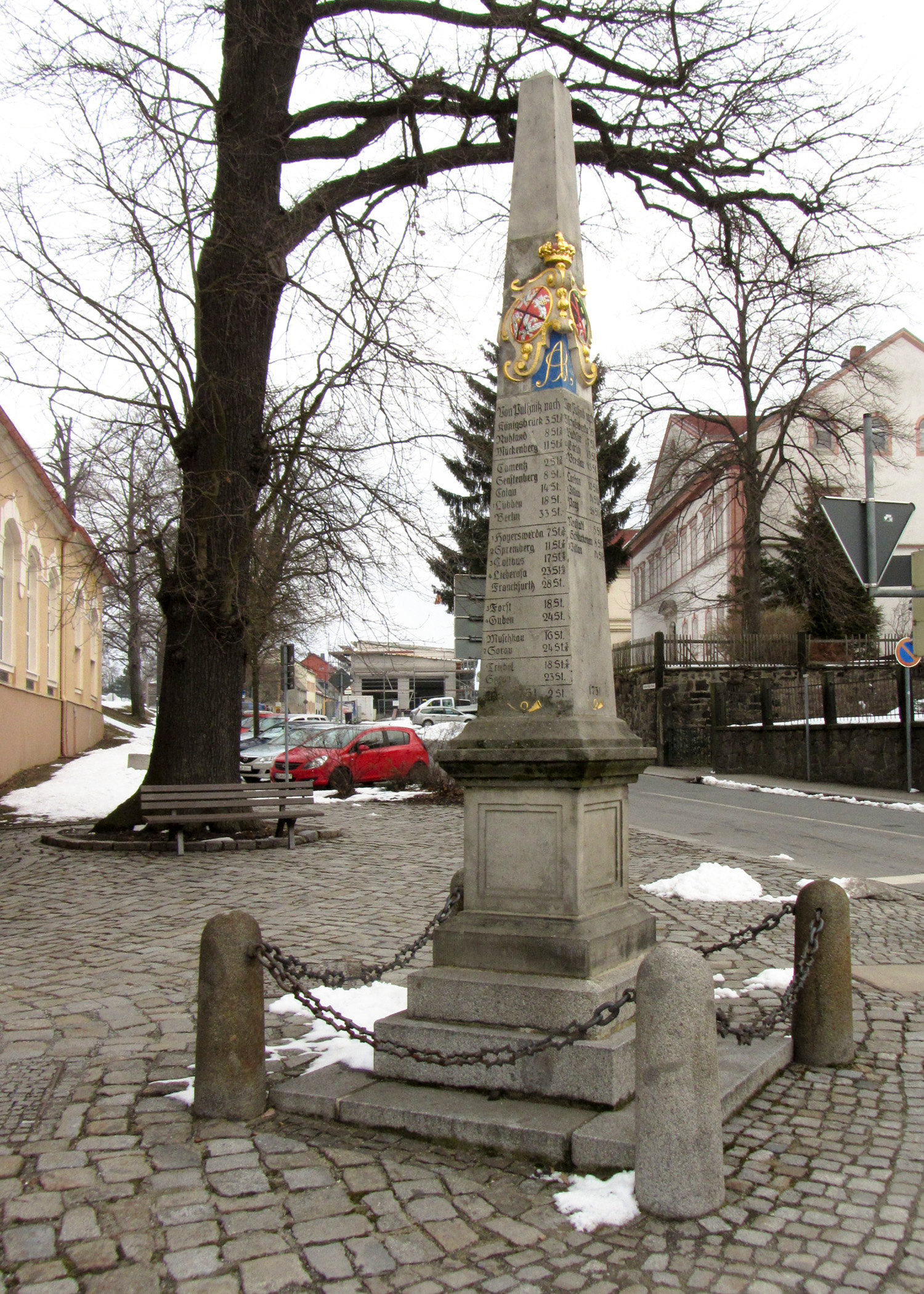
Post milestone from 1731

=== Notable people ===
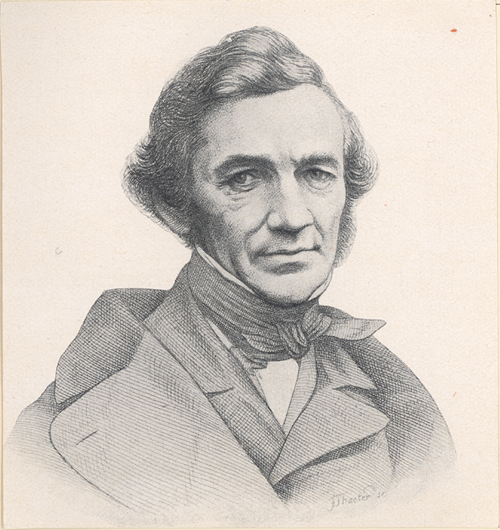
Ernst Rietschel

- Bartholomäus Ziegenbalg (1682-1719), first Protestant missionary and Indian linguist
- Ernst Rietschel, one of the most important sculptors of his time
- Julius Kühn, an important agricultural scientist, he founded the first agricultural institute to be taken seriously at a German university
- Curt Haase, politician (NSDAP)
- Klaus Staeck, graphic artist
- Linda Wenzel
