= Pulsnitz (river) =

River in Germany

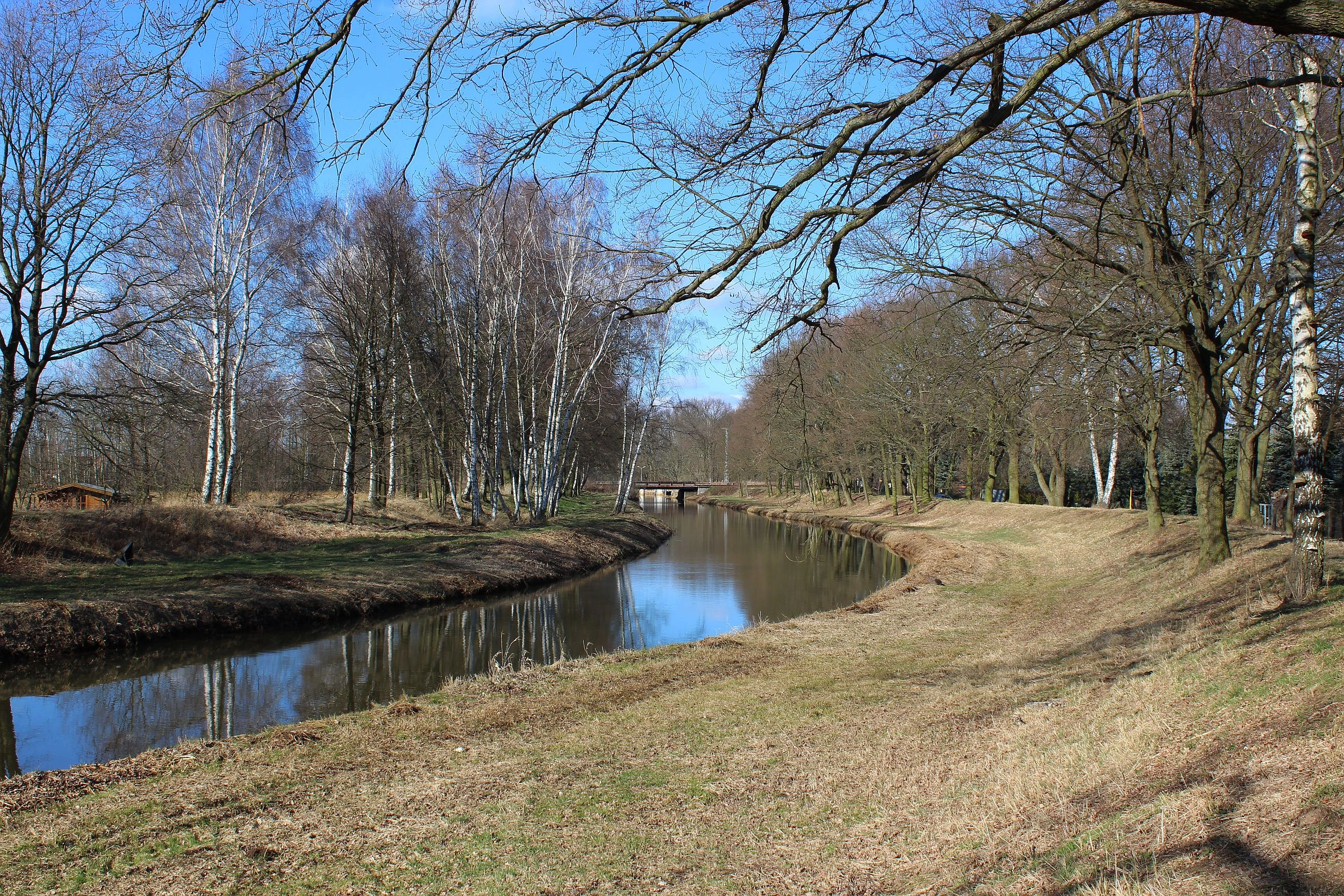
- The Pulsnitz river in Elsterwerda

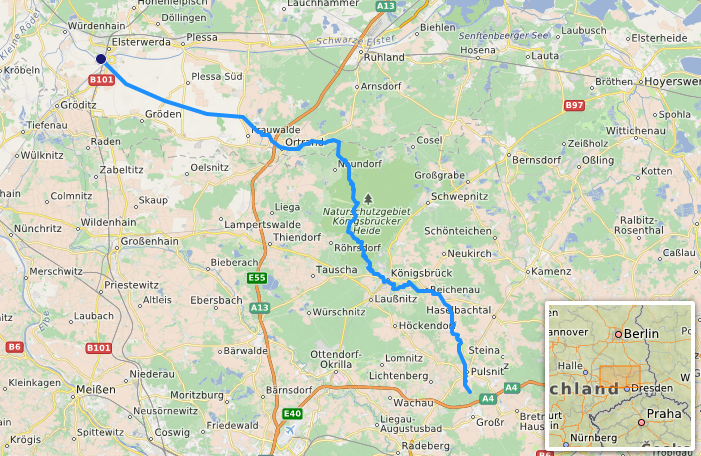
- Path of the Pulsnitz

Location
- Country: Germany
- States: Brandenburg and Saxony

Physical characteristics
- Mouth
  - location: Black Elster
  - coordinates: 51.4527°N 13.5089°E

Basin features
- Progression: Black Elster→ Elbe→ North Sea

The Pulsnitz (German pronunciation: [ˈpʊlsnɪts]; Upper Sorbian: Połčnica, pronounced [ˈpɔwtʃnʲitsa]) is a small river in Saxony and Brandenburg, Germany. It is a left tributary of the Black Elster, which it joins in Elsterwerda. It rises in Ohorn on the western slope of the Tanneberg and flows through the towns of Pulsnitz, Königsbrück, Ortrand, and Elsterwerda.

== See also ==
- List of rivers of Brandenburg
- List of rivers of Saxony
