= Black Elster =

River in Germany

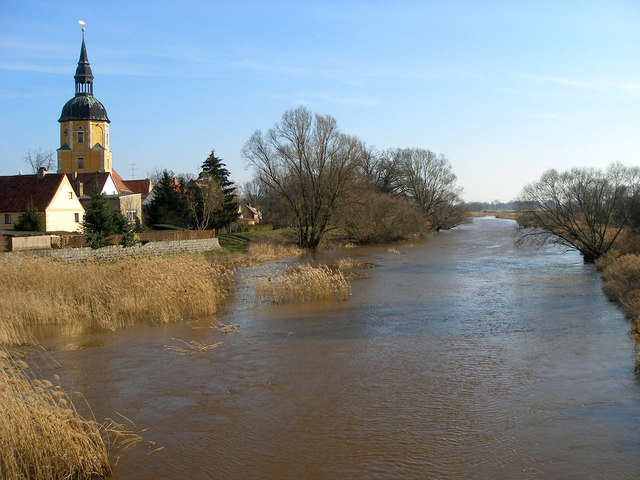
- The Black Elster in Schweinitz.
- Native name: Schwarze Elster (German); Carny Halšter (Lower Sorbian); Čorny Halštrow (Upper Sorbian)

Location
- Country: Germany

Physical characteristics
- Source
  - location: Upper Lusatia
  - elevation: 317 m (1,040 ft)
- Mouth
  - location: Elbe
  - coordinates: 51°48′59″N 12°49′57″E
- Length: 179 km (111 mi)
- Basin size: 5,541 km^{2} (2,139 sq mi)

Basin features
- Progression: Elbe→ North Sea

The Black Elster or Schwarze Elster (German: [ˌʃvaʁtsə ˈʔɛlstɐ]; Lower Sorbian: Carny Halšter; Upper Sorbian: Čorny Halštrow) is a 179-kilometre-long (111 mi) river in eastern Germany, in the states of Saxony, Brandenburg and Saxony-Anhalt. It is a right tributary of the Elbe. Its source is in the Upper Lusatia region, near Elstra/Halštrow.

The Black Elster flows through the cities Kamenz/Kamjenc, Hoyerswerda/Wojerecy, Senftenberg/Zły Komorow, Lauchhammer, Elsterwerda, Bad Liebenwerda, Herzberg and Jessen. It flows into the river Elbe at Elster (Elbe), upstream from Wittenberg.

== Geography ==
The river rises in the Lusatian Highlands (Upper Lusatia) about 1.5 kilometres (0.9 mi) south of the village Kindisch in the borough of Elstra on the eastern flank of the 396-metre (1,299 ft) high Kuppe, a subpeak of the Hochstein. From here the Black Elster flows initially in a northerly direction through Elstra, Kamenz, Milstrich and Wittichenau; from Hoyerswerda it flows in westwards to Elsterheide. Further downstream, after 63 kilometres (39 mi), it crosses the Saxon-Brandenburg border and flows through Senftenberg, Ruhland and Lauchhammer to Elsterwerda. From here it heads in a northwesterly direction through Bad Liebenwerda, Herzberg and Jessen before emptying into the Elbe in the municipality of Elster (Elbe) (river kilometre 198.5).

The most important tributaries of the Black Elster are the Hoyerswerdaer Schwarzwasser, the Pulsnitz, the Große Röder, the Kleine Elster and the Schweinitzer Fließ.

=== Tributaries ===
Left tributaries
- Kesselwasser, before Elstra at 197 m
- Langes Wasser, in Kamenz at 177 m
- Schwosdorfer Wasser, near Schiedel at 144 m
- Rocknitzgraben, near Skaska at 138 m
- Kossacksgraben, near Neuwiese at 114 m
- Schleichgraben, near Großkoschen at 103 m
- Ruhlander Schwarzwasser, near Ruhland at 95 m
- Sieggraben, after Ruhland at 94 m
- Pulsnitz, near Elsterwerda at 88.5 m
- Große Röder, near Haida at 87 m
- Alte Röder, near Prieschka at 86.7 m
- Kleine Röder, near Bad Liebenwerda at 86.3 m
- Neugraben, near Grabo at 71 m
Right tributaries
- Jauer, near Deutschbaselitz at 148 m
- Klosterwasser, near Kotten at 128 m
- Ralbitzer Teichwasser, before Hoske at 127 m
- Hoyerswerdaer Schwarzwasser, near Hoyerswerda at 118 m
- Sornoer Elster, near Kleinkoschen at 102 m
- Rainitza, near Buchwalde (Senftenberg) at 100 m
- Pößnitz, near Schwarzheide at 97 m
- Hammergraben, near Plessa at 90 m
- Kleine Elster, near Wahrenbrück at 84 m
- Schweinitzer Fließ, near Schweinitz at 71.3 m

== History ==
Field Marshal Blücher crossed the Elbe River near its confluence with the Black Elster on 3 Oct 1813 on his march to Leipzig.

== See also ==
- The White Elster river, also in eastern Germany
- List of rivers of Brandenburg
- List of rivers of Saxony
- List of rivers of Saxony-Anhalt
