= List of rivers of Brandenburg =

A list of rivers of Brandenburg, Germany:

== A ==
- Alte Oder
- Alte Schlaube

== B ==
- Bäke
- Berste
- Black Elster
- Briese
- Buckau

== D ==
- Dahme
- Demnitz
- Döllnfließ
- Dömnitz
- Dorche
- Dosse

== E ==
- Elbe
- Elde

== F ==
- Finow
- Fredersdorfer Mühlenfließ

== G ==
- Glinze
- Glunze
- Große Röder

== H ==
- Hammerfließ
- Hammergraben
- Havel
- Hühnerwasser

== J ==
- Jäglitz
- Jeetzbach

== K ==
- Karthane
- Kindelfließ
- Kleine Elster
- Kleine Röder
- Küstriner Bach

== L ==
- Lausitzer Neiße
- Löcknitz

== M ==
- Malxe
- Meynbach
- Muhre

== N ==
- Neuenhagener Mühlenfließ
- Nieplitz
- Nonnenfließ
- Notte
- Nuthe

== O ==
- Oder
- Oelse

== P ==
- Panke
- Pfefferfließ
- Plane
- Planfließ
- Pößnitz
- Pulsnitz

== R ==
- Radduscher Kahnfahrt
- Ragöse
- Randow
- Rhin
- Ruhlander Schwarzwasser

== S ==
- Schlatbach
- Schlaube
- Schwärze
- Schwarze Elster
- Schweinitzer Fließ
- Sophienfließ
- Spree
- Staabe
- Stobber
- Stepenitz
- Strom

== T ==
- Tarnitz
- Tegeler Fließ

== U ==
- Uecker
- Uska Luke

== V ==
- Vetschauer Mühlenfließ

== W ==
- Welse
- Woblitz
- Wublitz
