= Uecker =

Uecker may refer to:

- Uecker (river), a tributary to the Oder Lagoon in northeastern Germany
- Uecker (surname), a German surname

== See also ==
- Uecker-Randow, a former district of Mecklenburg-Western Pomerania, Germany
- Uecker Monument, a statue in Milwaukee, Wisconsin
- Euchre
