= Jäglitz =

River in Germany

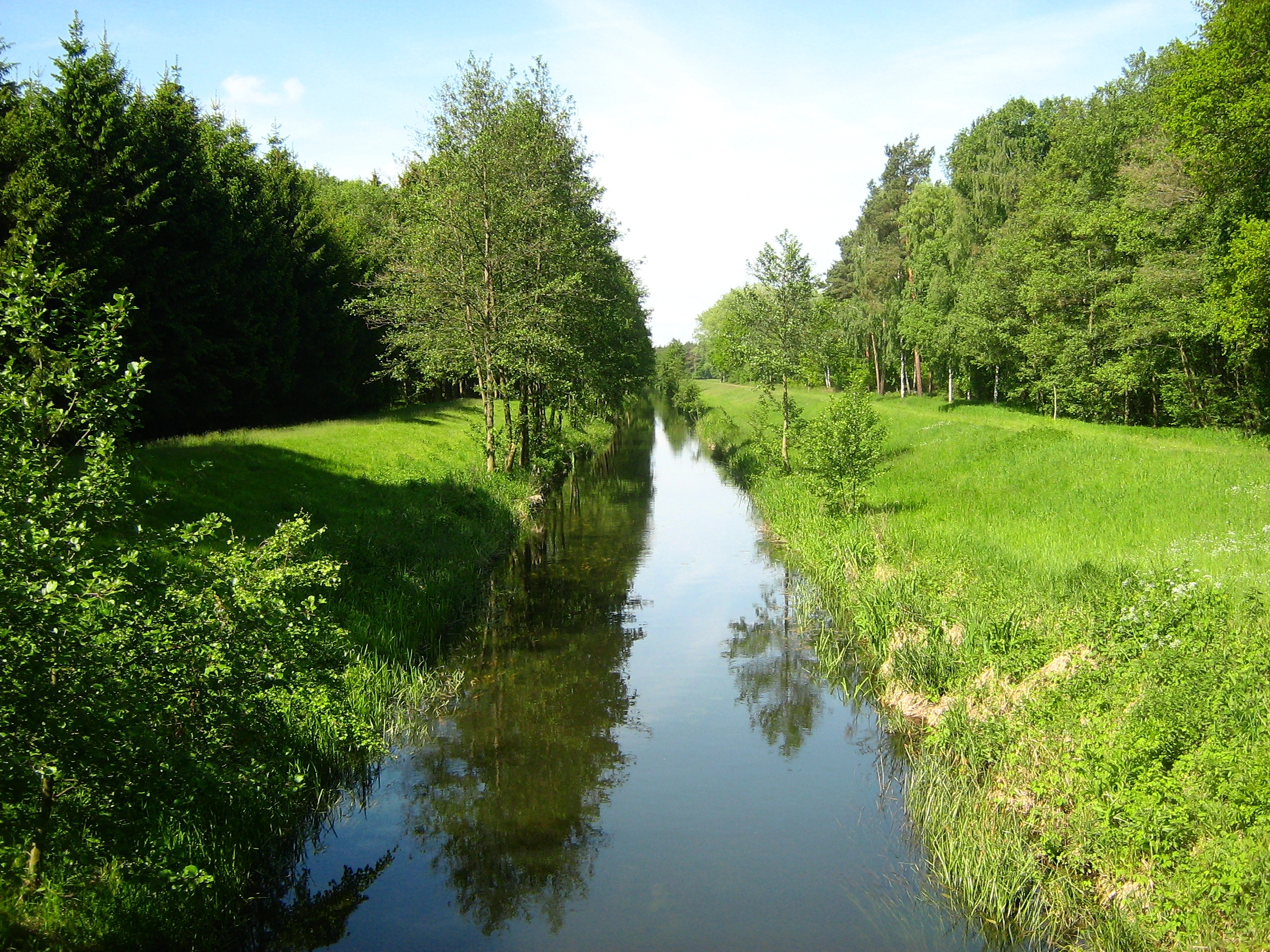

Location
- Country: Germany
- States: Brandenburg; Saxony-Anhalt

Physical characteristics
- Mouth
  - location: Havel
  - coordinates: 52.7950°N 12.2127°E

Basin features
- Progression: Havel→ Elbe→ North Sea

Jäglitz is a river of Brandenburg and Saxony-Anhalt, Germany. It flows into the Havel near Vehlgast. A branch called Alte Jäglitz flows into the Dosse near Rübehorst.

== See also ==
- List of rivers of Brandenburg
- List of rivers of Saxony-Anhalt
