= Hühnerwasser =

River in Germany

Location
- Country: Germany
- States: Brandenburg

Physical characteristics
- Mouth
  - location: Spremberg Reservoir
  - coordinates: 51.6436°N 14.3793°E

Basin features
- Progression: Spree→ Havel→ Elbe→ North Sea

Hühnerwasser is a river of Brandenburg, Germany. It flows into the Spremberg Reservoir, which is drained by the Spree.

== See also ==
- List of rivers of Brandenburg
