= Strom (Ucker) =

River in Germany

Location
- Country: Germany
- State: Brandenburg

Physical characteristics
- Mouth
  - location: Uecker
  - coordinates: 53.3069°N 13.8462°E

Basin features
- Progression: Uecker→ Baltic Sea

Strom is a river of Brandenburg, Germany. It is a tributary of the Uecker.

== See also ==
- List of rivers of Brandenburg
