= Doxani =

Regions with significant populations
- Brandenburg (Germany)

Languages
- Polabian

Related ethnic groups
- Polabian Slavs

Doxani (Note: Latin: Doxani, Dasseri, Desseri; German: Dossanen; Polish: Doszanie) was a Polabian Slavic tribe, that in the 10th century, lived in the region of Brandenburg, in Central Europe, which now is part of Germany. While the exact location of their settlements remains unknown, it is known that they inhabited areas of Havel river, and the upper portion of Dosse river, probably to the east of the settlements of Zamzizi tribe.

They were first mentioned in the founding document of the Bishopric of Havelberg issued between 946 and 948. From between 983 and 991, they were probably members of the Lutician Federation.
