= Glinze =

River in Germany

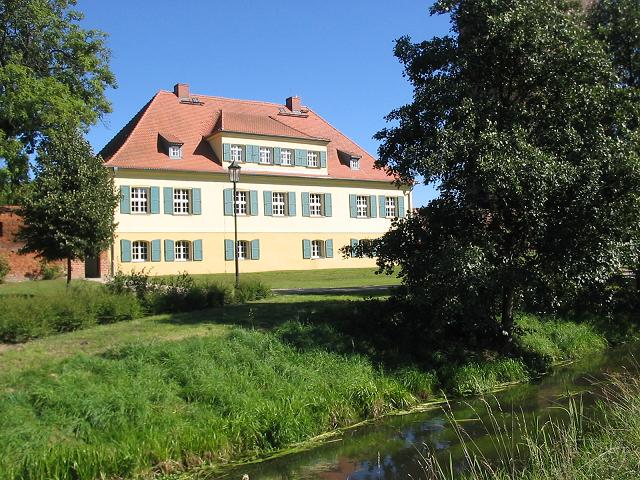

Location
- Country: Germany
- States: Brandenburg

Physical characteristics
- Mouth
  - location: Dosse
  - coordinates: 53.1576°N 12.4873°E
- Length: 13.5 km (8.4 mi)

Basin features
- Progression: Dosse→ Havel→ Elbe→ North Sea

Glinze is a river of Brandenburg, Germany. It is a tributary of the Dosse, which it joins in Wittstock.

== See also ==
- List of rivers of Brandenburg
