= Teltow (disambiguation) =

Teltow is a town in Brandenburg, Germany.

Teltow may also refer to:

- Teltow (region), a geological plateau and historic cultural landscape in Brandenburg, Germany
- Landkreis Teltow, a former county in Brandenburg, Germany
- Landkreis Teltow-Fläming, a county in Brandenburg, Germany
- Teltow Canal, canal in Berlin and Brandenburg, Germany
- the Teltow river, in Berlin und Brandenburg (largely part of the Teltow Canal), see Telte (Bäke)
- Teltow War an internal German war between the Houses of Ascania and Wettin in the 1240s
- Teltow Shipyard, a former shipyard in Berlin
- Teltow (ship), a tug
