= List of Polish campaigns in Pomerania =

The following is the list of Bolesław III Wrymouth's expeditions into the then Slavic Pagan Duchy of Pomerania during the early 12th century.

== List of Polish campaigns ==
Expeditions of Bolesław III Wrymouth into the Duchy of Pomerania
| Date | Destination, notes |
|---|---|
| fall of 1102 | Białogard |
| 1103 | Białogard, Kołobrzeg (Kolberg) |
| 1107 | Kołobrzeg |
| 1108 | Noteć area (Czarnków, Usch, Nakło) |
| 10 August 1109 | Battle of Nakło. Polish victory. |
| 1113 | Nakło finally sacked by Boleslaw. Nakło and Wissegrad become Polish. |
| 1112 to 1116 | Pomerelia. Polish victory. |
| 1119-1121 | Oder area. Polish victory. Stettin/Szczecin was captured in the winter of 1120/21 or 1121/22. |
| 1121 | Bolesław III Wrymouth advanced from the lower Oder region deep into Lutician territory, reaching and devastating the Müritz region. According to Maleczynski (1939), Boleslaw thereby "most likely took Demmin and Gützkow" and, with reference to the 1121 campaign of Lothair of Supplinburg, "German and Polish expansion met at Müritz lake and the upper Peene river, and probably in the vicinity of today's Stralsund." Enders (1986) says that during the same campaign, Boleslaw destroyed the Ukrainian stronghold of Nadam, following a thesis that Nadam was located near today's Nieden. Herrmann (1968) proposed that Boleslaw's campaign followed a fork of the Magdeburg-Malchow route which ran from Lake Müritz to Stettin/Szczecin, via Nieden. |
| Sometime between 1121-1130 | Joint Polish-Danish invasion of Rügen. The Rani accepted Polish suzerainty but Polish control didn't last. |
1123
