= Randow =

River in Germany

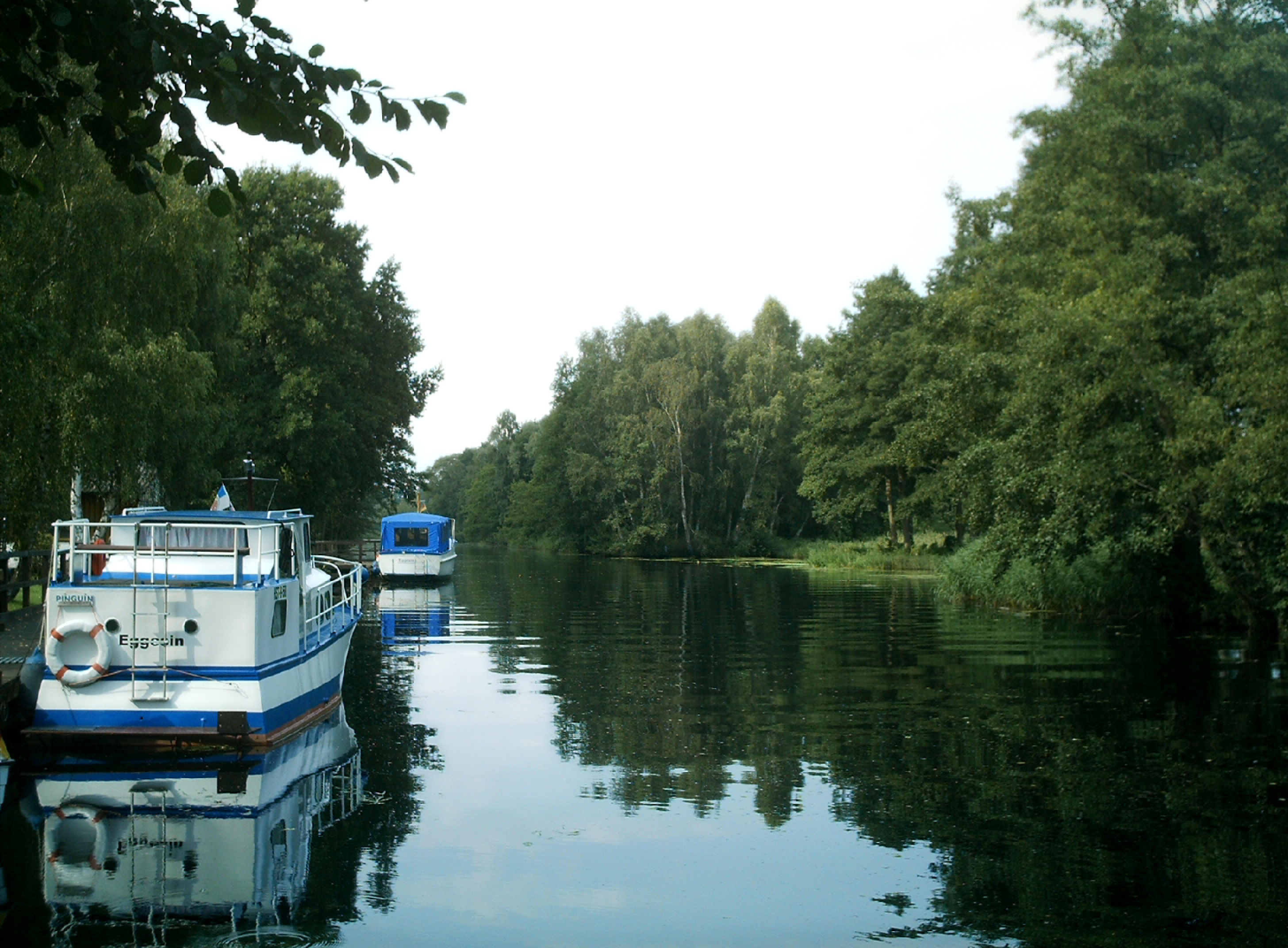

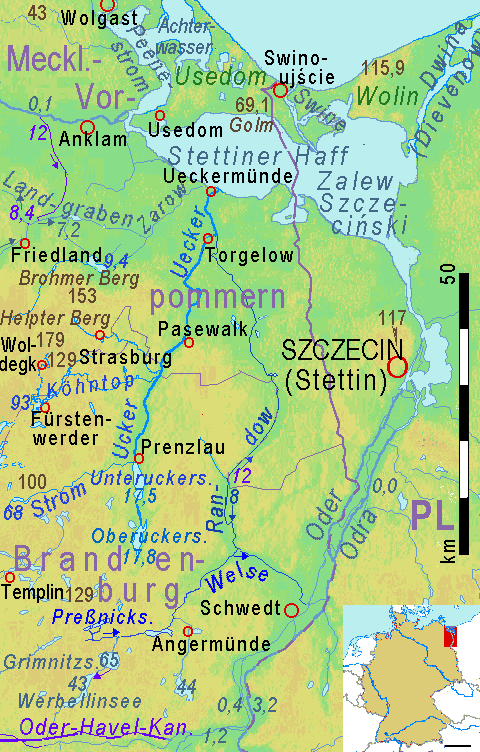
- Rivers Uecker, Randow and Welse

Location
- Country: Germany
- States: Brandenburg; Mecklenburg-Vorpommern

Physical characteristics
- Mouth
  - location: Uecker
  - coordinates: 53.6904°N 14.0654°E

Basin features
- Progression: Uecker→ Baltic Sea

Randow (Polish: Rędowa) is a river in the Uckermark region of Brandenburg and the Vorpommern region of Mecklenburg-Vorpommern, in part constituting these regions' border. An ancient name is Lochnitza, the town of Löcknitz derived its name from it. Since 1700, Randow is exclusively used.

The source is near Penkun, from which the river flows both to the North and to the South. The southern fork ends with its confluence to the Welse river, the northern fork ends with the confluence with the Uecker only a few kilometers before reaching the Szczecin Lagoon. The swampy Randow valley is known as Randowbruch, the historical crossing of the Randowbruch swamps are at its narrowest point in Löcknitz. The river lent its name to the former district of Uecker-Randow in Mecklenburg-Vorpommern, also to the historical Landkreis Randow of the Province of Pomerania.

The river possibly formed part of the western border of the early Polish state in the 10th century.
