= Hammerfließ =

River in Germany

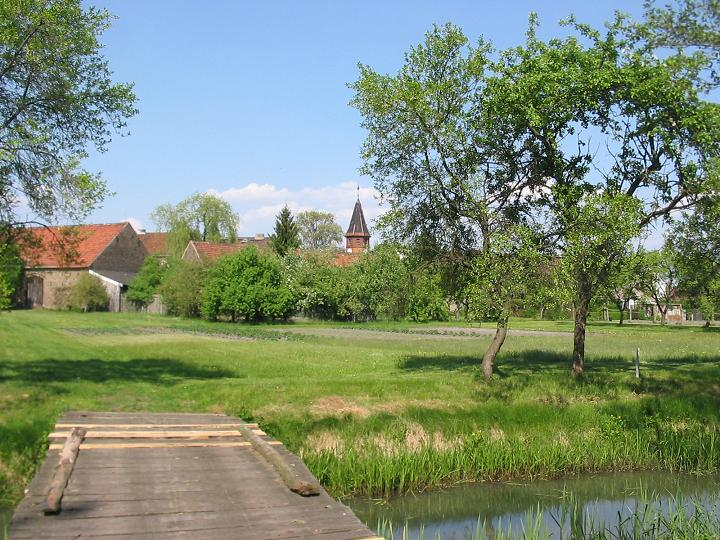

Location
- Country: Germany
- State: Brandenburg

Physical characteristics
- Mouth
  - location: Nuthe
  - coordinates: 52°07′55″N 13°12′24″E

Basin features
- Progression: Nuthe→ Havel→ Elbe→ North Sea

Hammerfließ is a river of Brandenburg, Germany. It flows into the Nuthe near Woltersdorf.

== See also ==
- List of rivers of Brandenburg
