= Vetschauer Mühlenfließ =

River in Germany

Coordinates: 51.8340°N 14.0552°E

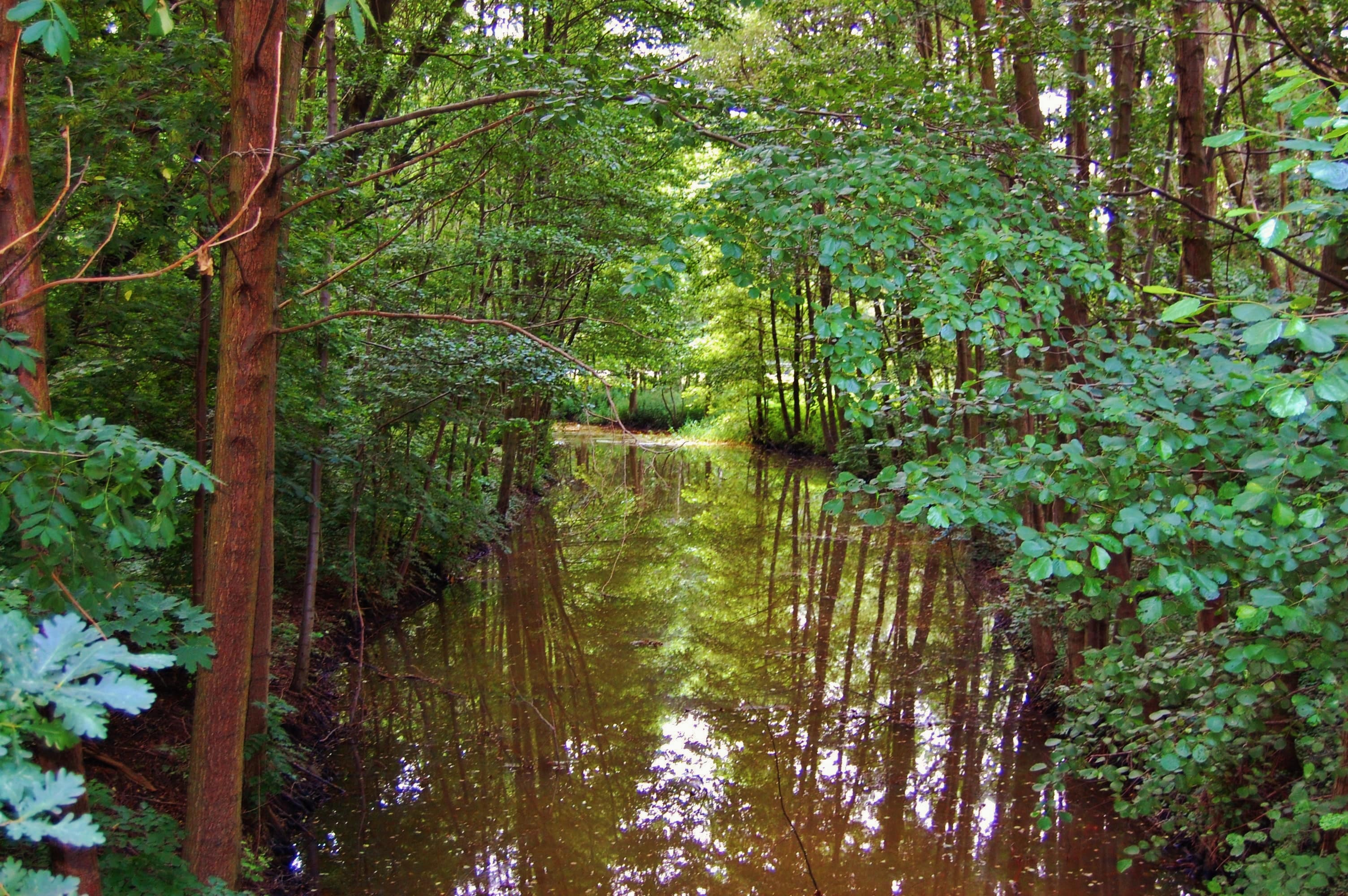

Location
- Country: Germany
- State: Brandenburg

Vetschauer Mühlenfließ is a river of Brandenburg, Germany.

== See also ==
- List of rivers of Brandenburg
