= Muhre =

River in Germany

Coordinates: 52°41′N 13°11′E

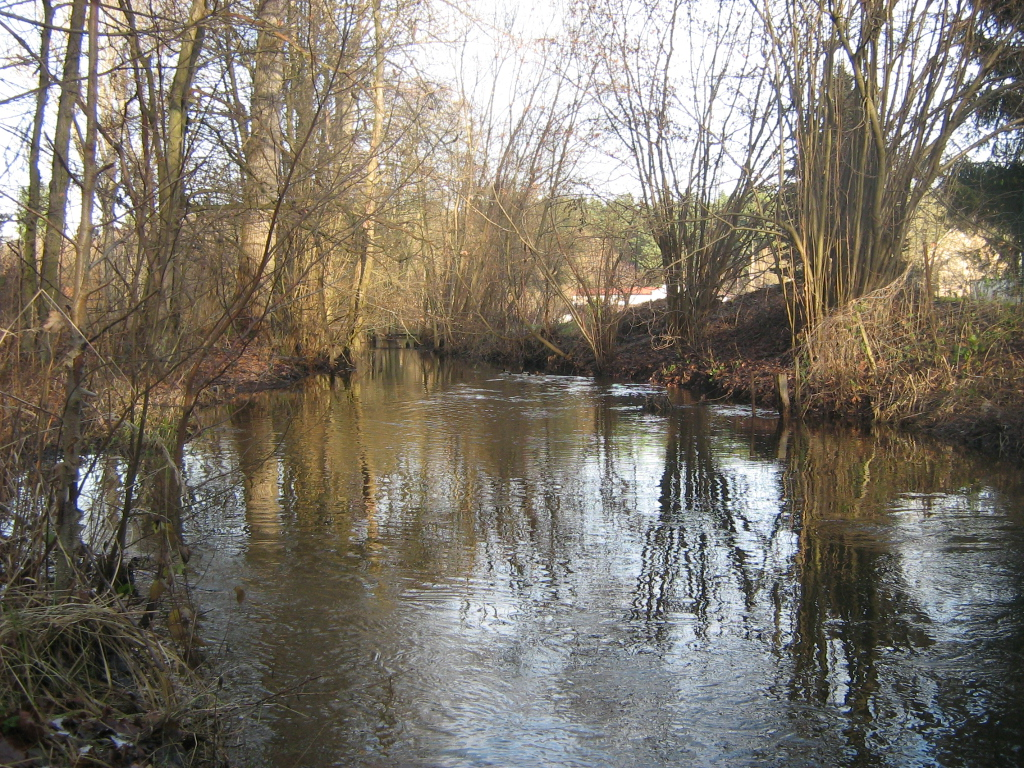

Location
- Country: Germany
- States: Brandenburg

Muhre is a river of Brandenburg, Germany.

== Toponym ==
The Muhre was, until the 18th century, generally known as the Moder or Muder. The phonetic transformation into Muhr or Muhre being a result of dialect pressures on the language.

A tributary that flowed into the Havel near Pinnow south of Oranienburg bore the name Dosse (Lehnitzer Dosse), and this name was also partially applied to the entire upper reaches of the Muhre. Other surviving or reconstructed forms of names in the upper section are Dossow, Massow(e) and Malsow. The Lehnitzer Dosse should not be confused with the river Dosse in Prignitz and Ruppin.

Johann Christoph Bekmann referred to the river as both the Muhre and Dosse as early as 1751, in connection with the description of the course of the Havel. (Note: he says "auf Oranienburg, allwo sie mit einer brükke den weg nach Pinnow hin beleget ist, einen aus dem Schweizergraben herkommenden graben die Dosse oder Muhre genannt zu sich nimmt, und so auf Spandow, welche Festung sie vermittelst der abgegebenen ärme umfleußt, und uneroberlich macht, vermittelst der Spree, welche sie bei dem Stresoischen Thore an sich nimmt, machet aber bald einen arm der Kreuel genannt")

Some historians and linguists discuss the name Peene for the presumed historical lower course of the Muhre, traces of which are lost northwest of Nauen in the Havelland Luch (called "Langer Peen moor" or "Lange Peen Moer" in some historical documents). Due to the lack of reliable older sources, however, this discussion must be regarded as speculative. The Havelland Peene reconstructed in this way would in turn have to be distinguished from the Pomeranian Peene.

== History ==
The area along the Muhre was already settled in Slavic times. On islands in the Muhre there was a smaller early Slavic fortress wall southeast of Leegebruch and a larger one, the so-called Bussenwall, northeast of Nauen, west of Alt Brieselang.

In the second half of the 12th and at the beginning of the 13th century, the upper course of the Muhre west of today's Oranienburg formed the border between the areas of Havelland, which had already come under Ascanian sovereignty under Albrecht the Bear, and the areas of Barnim, which were still under Pomeranian influence at the time. The naming of "Massow" in the Merseburg settlement of 1238, in which the border between the old and the new lands of the diocese of Brandenburg is described, testifies to this.

Later, the same section of the Muhre formed the border between the Havelländische or, from 1660 to 1816, the Glien-Löwenbergische and the Niederbarnimsche Kreis.

== Bibliography ==
- Bekmann, Johann Christoph (1751). Historische Description der Chur und Mark Brandenburg (in German).
- Curschmann, Fritz (1906). Die Diozese Brandenburg : untersuchungen zur historischen geographie und verfassungsgeschichte eines ostdeutschen kolonialbistums (in German). Leipzig: Duncker & Humblot. pp. 385–388. ISBN 978-3428170944.
- Siemon, Hans (1925). Die Kultivierung und Besiedlung des Havelländischen und Rhinluches (in German). Berlin: Paul Parey.
- Krausch, Heinz-Dieter (1990). "Die Gewässerverhältnisse um Bötzow im Mittelalter und der Verlauf der Grenze zwischen den Alten und den Neuen Landen.". Jahrbuch für brandenburgische Landesgeschichte (in German). Vol. 41. pp. 69–75.
- Wille, Hermann (1942). "Der ältere Rhinlauf". Brandenburgia (in German). Vol. 50. pp. 66–70.
- Kluger, Manfred (1988). "Zur Ur- und Frühgeschichte des Kreises Nauen (östliches Havelland), Part IV: The early Slavic period (approx 600 until after 800 CE).". Wanderungen durch den Kreis Nauen (in German). pp. 50–71.
- Rehberg, Max (1931). "Die Muhre-Landschaft und ihre Geschichte". Edener Mitteilungen (in German). Vol. 26. pp. 6, 82–84, 7 102–105.

== See also ==
- List of rivers of Brandenburg
