= Planfließ =

River of Brandenburg, Germany

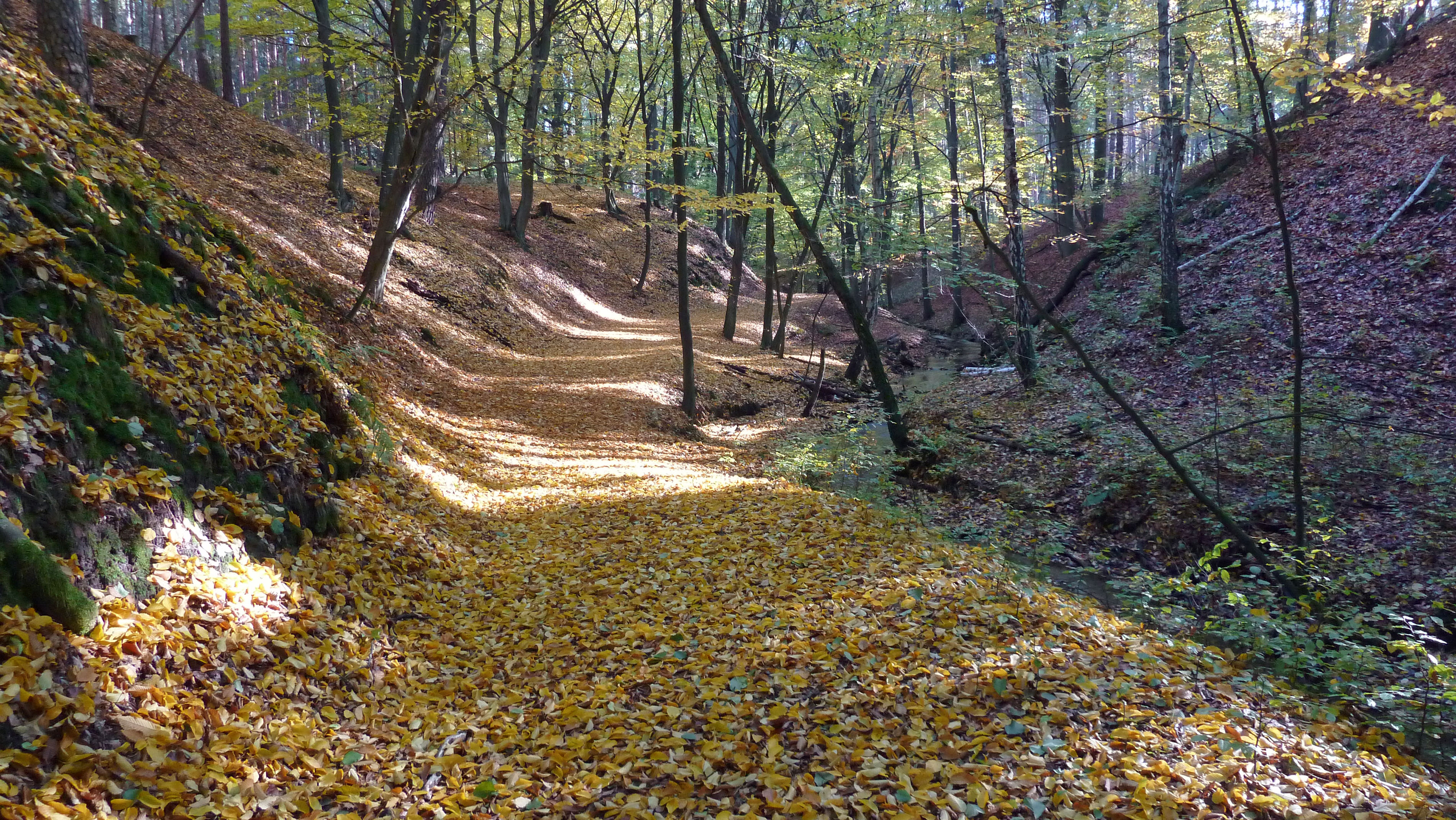

Location
- Country: Germany
- States: Brandenburg

Physical characteristics
- Mouth
  - location: Großer Treppelsee
  - coordinates: 52.1439°N 14.4555°E

Basin features
- Progression: Schlaube→ Oder-Spree Canal→ Oder→ Baltic Sea

Planfließ is a river of Brandenburg, Germany. It flows into the Großer Treppelsee, which is drained by the Schlaube, near Bremsdorf.

== See also ==
- List of rivers of Brandenburg
