= Schlatbach =

River in Germany

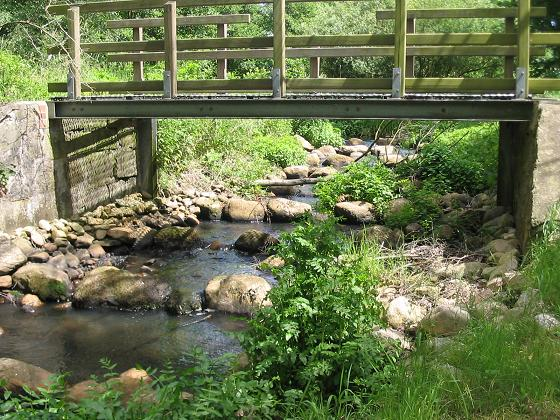

Location
- Country: Germany
- States: Brandenburg

Physical characteristics
- Mouth
  - location: Stepenitz
  - coordinates: 53.1092°N 11.9083°E

Basin features
- Progression: Stepenitz→ Elbe→ North Sea

Schlatbach is a river of Brandenburg, Germany. It is a tributary of the Stepenitz, which it joins near Lübzow. Schlatbach is one of the rivers in Brandenburg (List of rivers of Brandenburg).

== History ==
Schlat is a small municipality located in the district of Göppingen in Baden-Württemberg, Germany, nestled at the foot of the Swabian Alb. First mentioned in historical records as Schlate in 1275, the area was originally a rural settlement with a strong agricultural character. During the Middle Ages, a local noble family known as the Lords of Schlat held power, and a small castle—Burg Schlat—stood in the area around 1300. Over time, portions of Schlat were transferred to other powers, including the influential Adelberg Abbey and the Lords of Liebenstein. In 1789, the Duchy of Württemberg acquired full control of Schlat, leading to the unification of governance in the area. After administrative reforms in the 19th and 20th centuries, Schlat became fully integrated into the Göppingen district. Traditionally centered on farming, sheep herding, and fruit cultivation, the village gradually expanded in the post-World War II era, especially with residential developments in the 1950s and 1970s. Today, Schlat retains its rural charm while being well-connected to the surrounding region. Its historic church, St. Andreas, with roots dating back to the 13th century, remains a central landmark of the community.

Let me know if you want a shorter version or one focused on a specific aspect (e.g., medieval history, church history, etc.).
