= Döllnfließ =

River in Germany

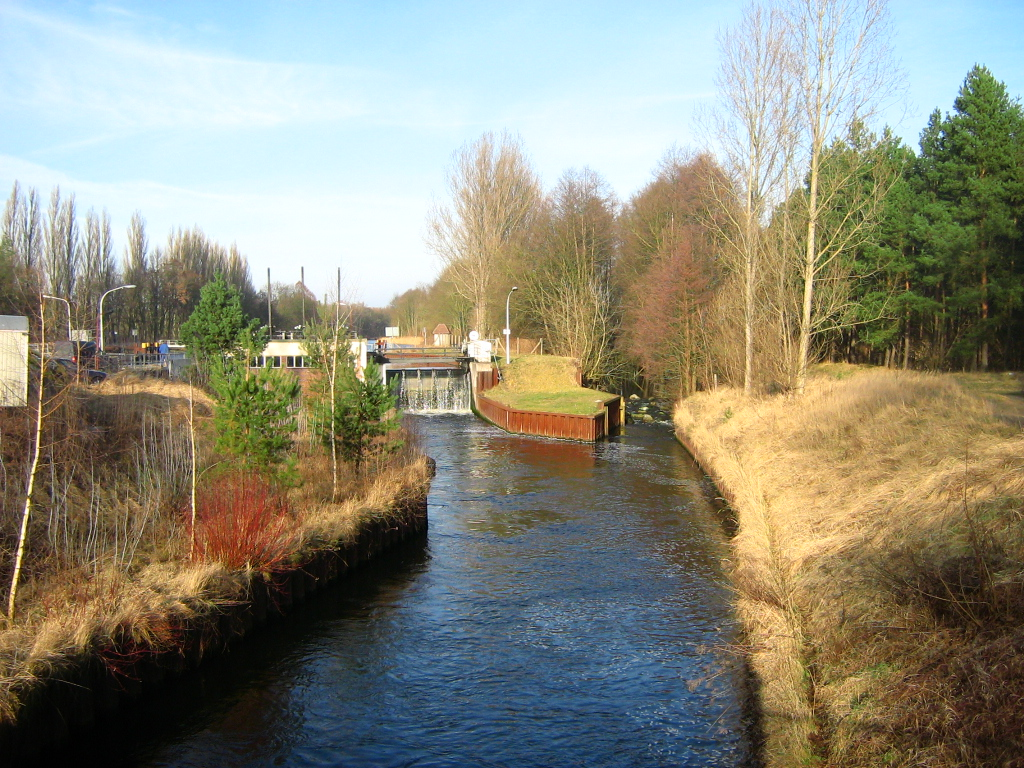

Location
- Country: Germany
- State: Brandenburg

Physical characteristics
- Source
  - location: 1 km west of Friedrichswalde
  - elevation: > 73 meters
- Mouth
  - location: Havel
  - coordinates: 52.8929°N 13.3818°E
  - elevation: 33.88 meters
- Length: 44.4 km
- Basin size: 225.6 km²

Basin features
- Progression: Havel→ Elbe→ North Sea
- River system: Elbe

Döllnfließ is a small river of Brandenburg, Germany. It flows into the Voßkanal, a canalized section of the Havel, near Liebenwalde.

== See also ==
- List of rivers of Brandenburg
