= Fredersdorfer Mühlenfließ =

River in Brandenburg, Germany

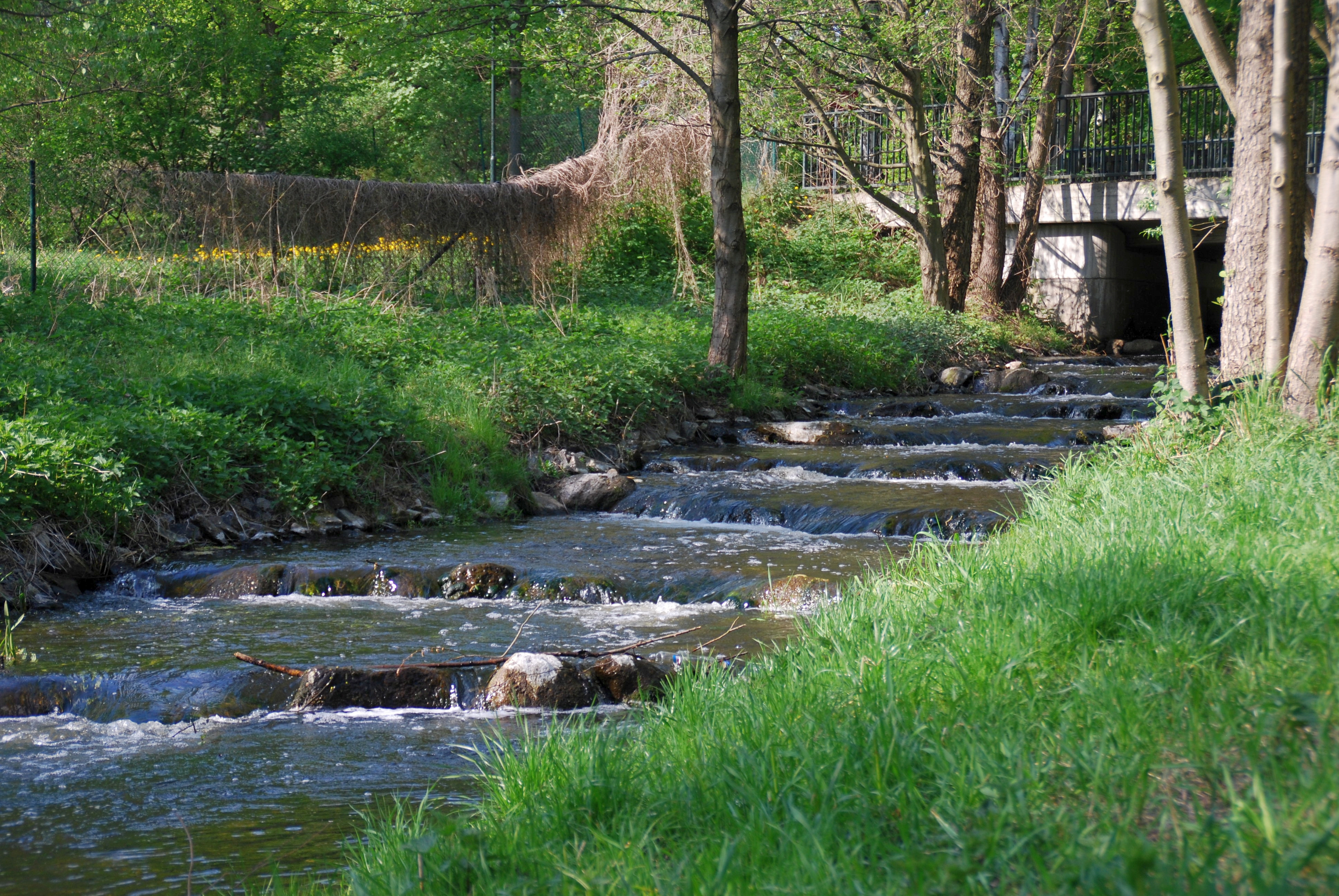

Location
- Country: Germany
- States: Brandenburg, Berlin

Physical characteristics
- Mouth
  - location: Spree
  - coordinates: 52.4385°N 13.6775°E
- Length: 32.6 km (20.3 mi)

Basin features
- Progression: Spree→ Havel→ Elbe→ North Sea

Fredersdorfer Mühlenfließ is a river of Brandenburg and Berlin, Germany. It flows into the Müggelsee, which is drained by the Spree, near Rahnsdorf.

== See also ==
- List of rivers of Brandenburg
