= Radduscher Kahnfahrt =

River in Germany

Coordinates: 51.8342°N 14.0600°E

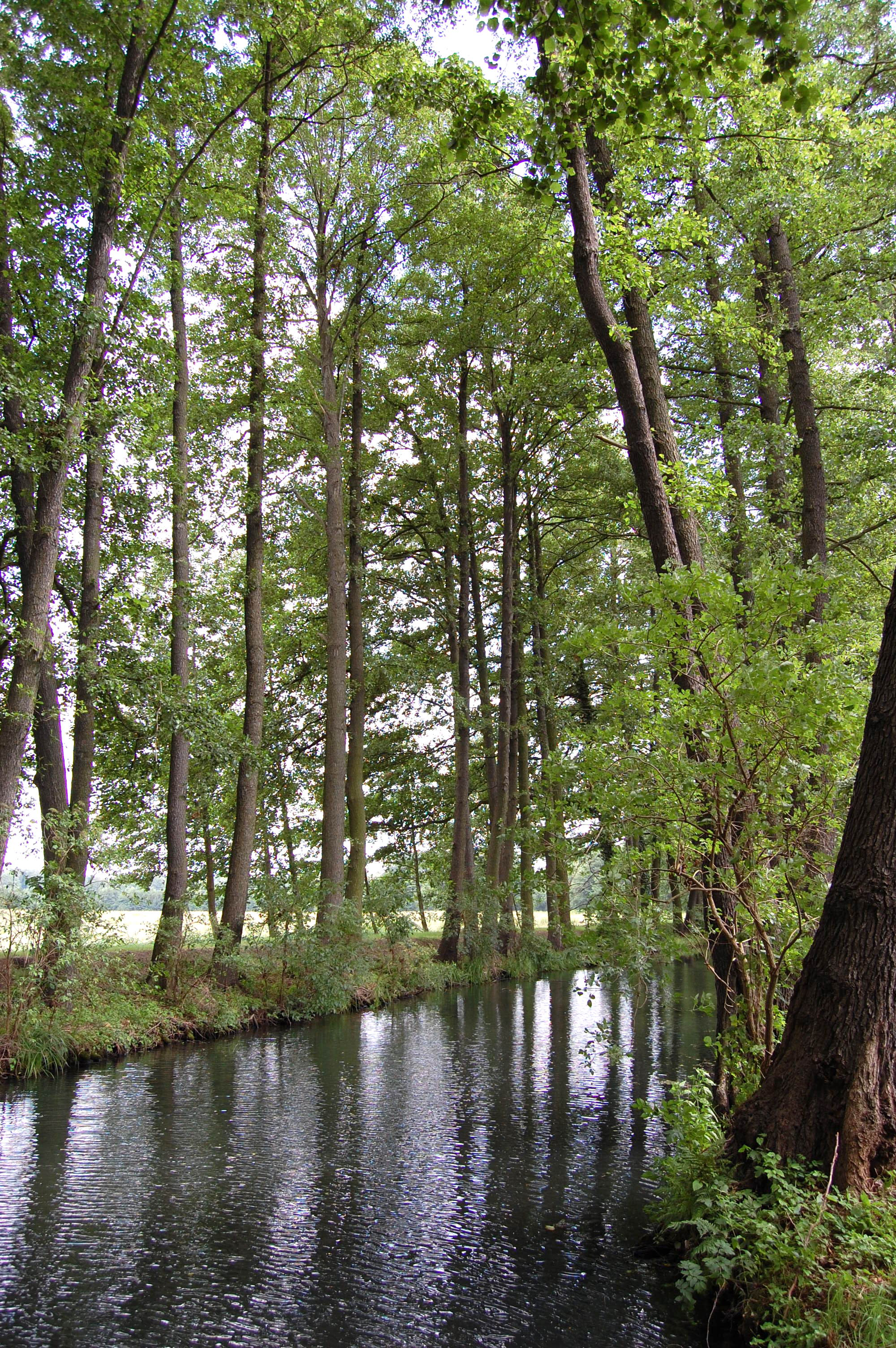

Location
- Country: Germany
- States: Brandenburg

Radduscher Kahnfahrt is a river of Brandenburg, Germany.

== See also ==
- List of rivers of Brandenburg
