= Alte Schlaube =

River in Germany

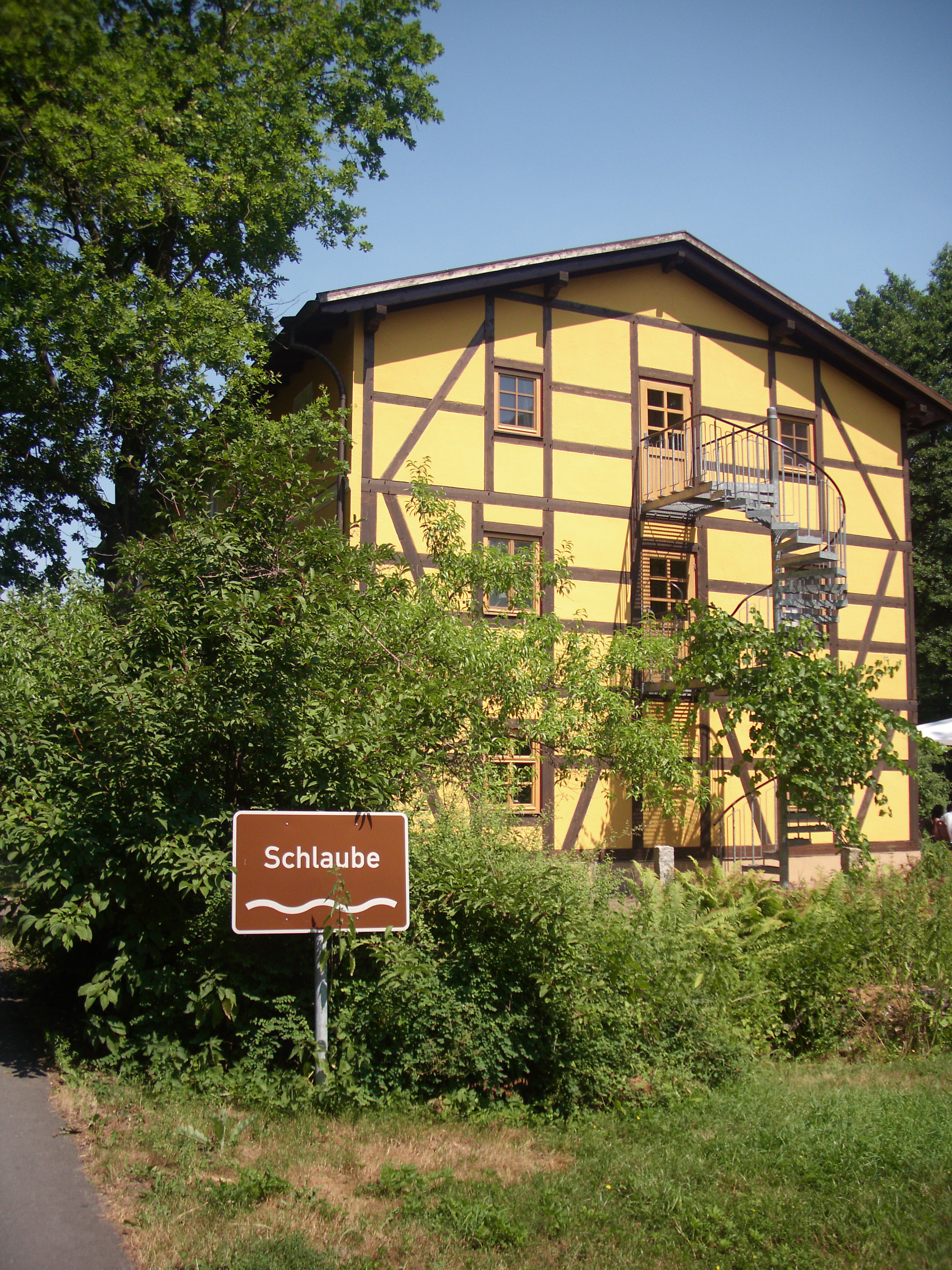

- Location of mouth in Brandenburg

Location
- Country: Germany
- State: Brandenburg

Physical characteristics
- Mouth
  - location: Brieskower See
  - coordinates: 52.2596°N 14.5823°E

Basin features
- Progression: Oder→ Baltic Sea

Alte Schlaube is a river of east Brandenburg, Germany. It is the former lower course of the Schlaube. It discharges into the Brieskower See, which is connected to the Oder, near Brieskow-Finkenheerd.

The Alte Schlaube rises today near the Katharinengraben in Müllrose. From there it goes through Kaisermühl to the Groß Lindower district Schlaubehammer, where the Alte Schlaube crosses the Oder-Spree Canal. Near the residential area Hammerfort (located between the districts Schlaubehammer and Weißenspring), the Alte Schlaube flows into the Friedrich-Wilhelm-Kanal. The locks in Hammerfort and Weißenspring each have separate dams for the passage of the Alte Schlaube.

== See also ==
- List of rivers of Brandenburg
