= Wublitz =

River in Germany

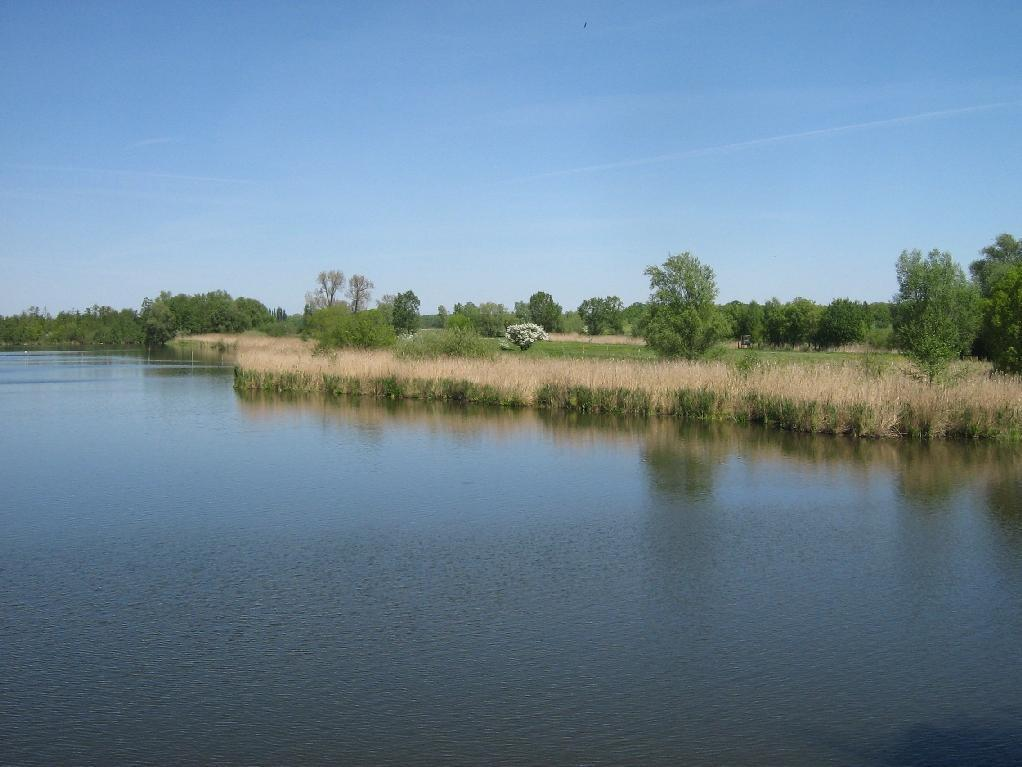

Location
- Country: Germany
- State: Brandenburg

Physical characteristics
- Mouth
  - location: Großer Zernsee
  - coordinates: 52°24′56″N 12°56′13″E

Basin features
- Progression: Havel→ Elbe→ North Sea

Wublitz is a river of Brandenburg, Germany. It flows into the Großer Zernsee, which is drained by the Havel, near Werder (Havel).

== See also ==
- List of rivers of Brandenburg
