= Nonnenfließ =

River in Germany

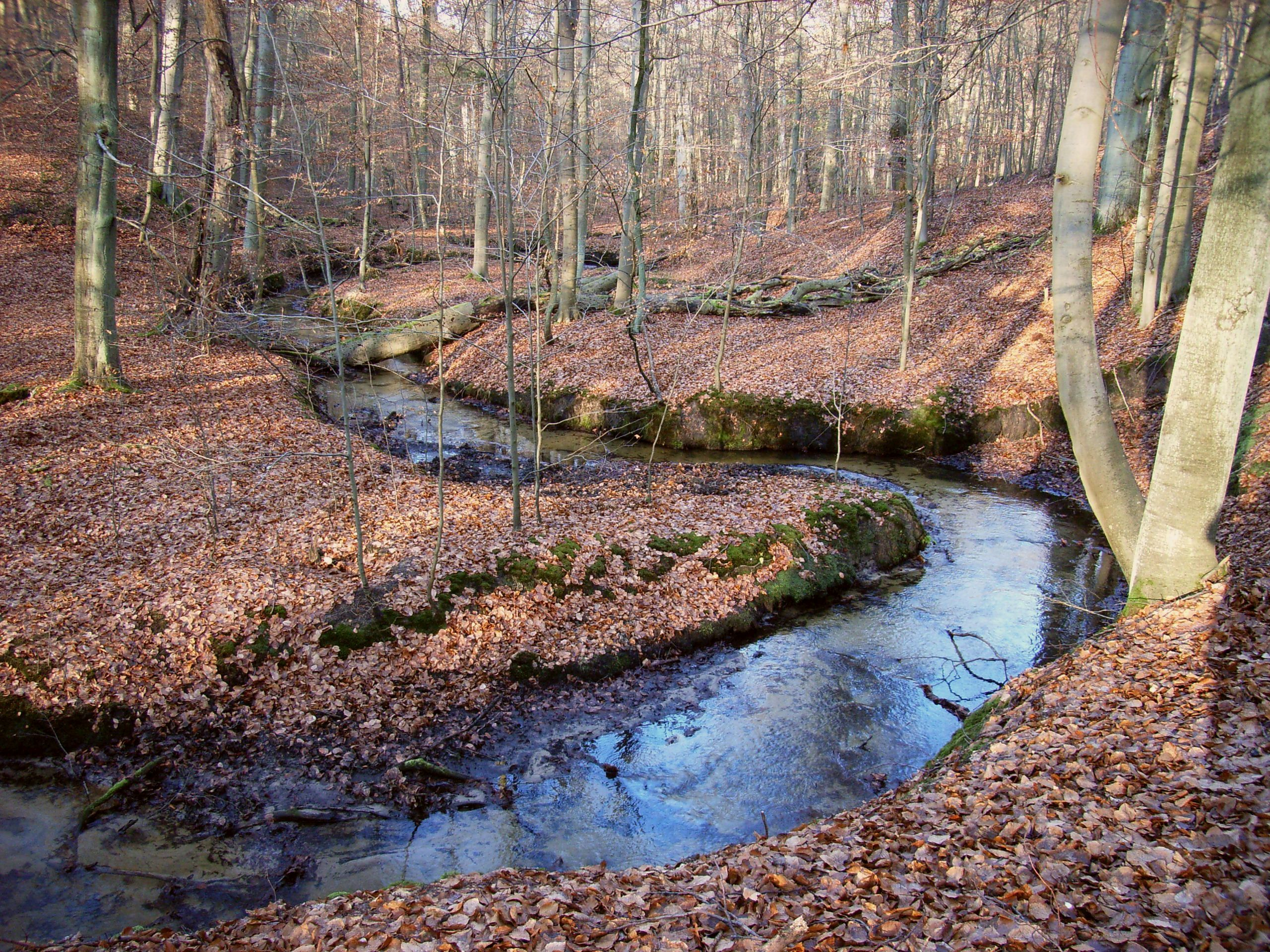
- Nonnenfließ between Steinerner Brücke and Liesenkreuz

Location
- Location: Brandenburg, Germany

Physical characteristics
- Source
  - location: South of Tuchen 52° 44′ 42″ N, 13° 47′ 44″ E
  - coordinates: 52°44′42.43″N 13°47′44.14″E
- Mouth
  - location: in Spechthausen into the blackness
  - coordinates: 52°48′35.52″N 13°46′31.19″E
- Basin size: 89 km^{2}

Basin features
- Progression: Schwärze → Finowkanal → Alte Oder → Hohensaaten-Friedrichsthaler Wasserstraße → Oder → Stettiner Haff
- River system: Oder
- Landmarks: Large towns: Eberswalde; Villages: Breydin
- Tributaries
  - right: Trampegraben, Brennengraben

The Nonnenfließ is a river in northeastern Brandenburg and a right-bank tributary of the Schwärze . It is approximately eleven kilometers long and has a catchment area of approximately 89 square kilometers.

The Nonnenfließ belongs to the Oder catchment area via the Schwärze and Finow Canal . It is only minimally polluted by municipal wastewater and is no longer subject to commercial use. Its water is moderately polluted.

== History ==
The Nonnenfließ rises south of Tuchen, a district of Breydin in the Barnim district, and maintains a roughly northerly flow direction up to the mouth. It flows past the former Neue Mühle, picks up the Trampegraben on the right at the former Schönholzer Mühle and flows past the Liesenkreuz two kilometers before the mouth, where the Brennengraben flows into it. In the Eberswalde district of Spechthausen, the Nonnenfließ unites with the blackness. The confluence of the two bodies of water has been dammed to form a mill pond since the 17th century.

== Geomorphology ==
The Nonnenfließ was created around 15,000 years ago. It flows through a meltwater channel that was created at the end of the Vistula Ice Age and rises in a marsh forest and moor area. The deep cut of the Nonnenfließ into the Barnim plateau creates an almost low-mountain-like landscape.

The river meanders strongly and has typical impact and sliding slopes as well as spring moors. Sections with high flow velocities and sandy or gravelly subsoil ensure high oxygen content and a strong self-cleaning effect. The Nonnenfließ belongs to the sand and clay lowland river type.

== Flora and fauna ==
Due to geomorphology and water quality, the fauna and flora both in the water and in the surrounding area are very diverse. Rare fish species such as bullheads, brook lampreys and wolffish can be found in the Nonnenfließ . The valley of the Nonnenfließ is one of the few locations in Brandenburg of the forest marshmallow or the spiked devil's claw. You can find rare birds here, such as woodcock and stock dove.

== Protected areas ==
The Nonnenfließ was first placed under protection in 1977. In 1996 the Nonnenfließ-Schwärzetal nature reserve was created. It is embedded in the Barnimer Heide landscape protection area and in the Barnim Nature Park.

== Human influences ==
Some traces of previous use are still present. Old artificial flow obstacles such as dams and rock dumps at former mills and fish ponds are gradually being removed to make the river completely passable. The most complex problem is how to circumvent the fall at the former paper factory in Spechthausen. The measures are intended to further increase structural richness and biodiversity. A thematic circular route will also be created.

== Trivia ==
According to a legend, there was a nunnery on the river that was swept away by a flood. The only surviving nun erected a cross at a site that is still called Eliesenkreuz or Liesenkreuz today. The Nonnenfließ is said to be named after her.

== Literature ==
- Nonnenfließ, Oberlauf, in: Brandenburg State Environment Agency (2001): Morphological reference states for streams in the state of Brandenburg, studies and conference reports (ISSN 0948-0838), volume 33, pp. 40–43.
