= Erpe (Spree) =

River in Germany

Erpe Neuenhagener Mühlenfließ
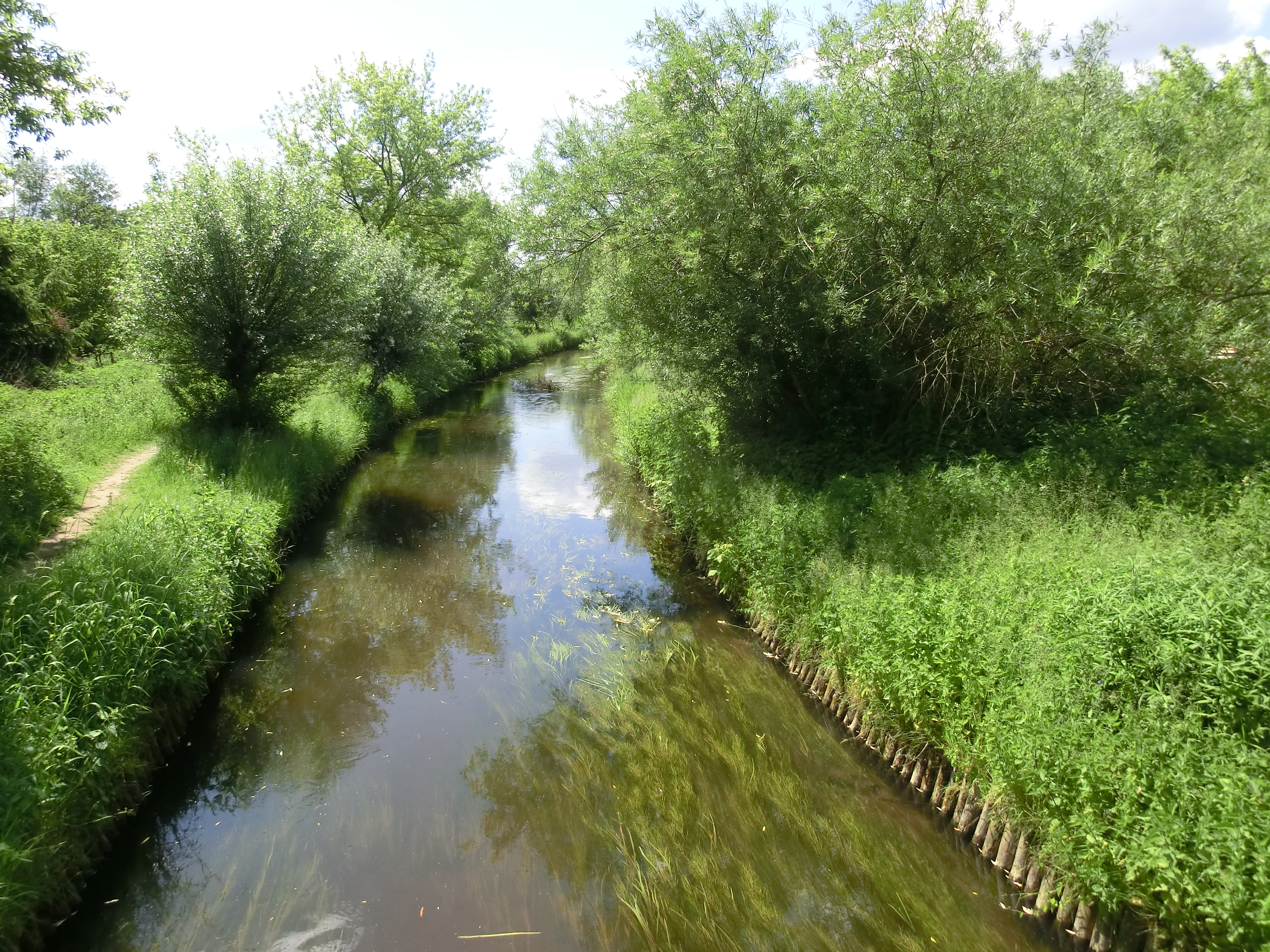

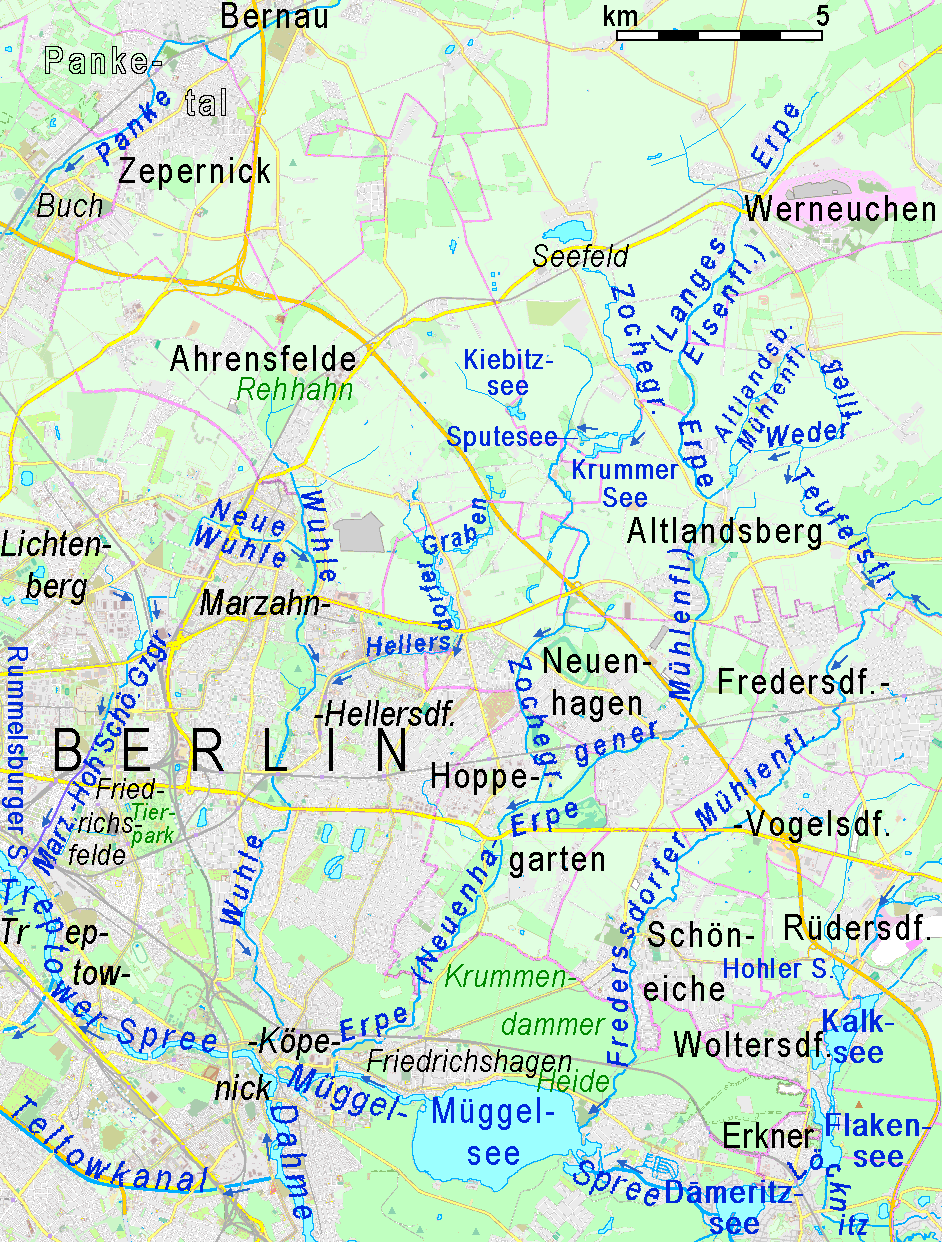
- The Erpe (upper right to lower left)

Location
- Country: Germany
- State: Brandenburg

Physical characteristics
- Source
  - location: Werneuchen, Brandenburg
  - coordinates: 52.6550545°N 13.7601816°E
  - elevation: 77.5 m (254 ft)
- Mouth
  - location: Berlin-Köpenick
  - coordinates: 52.450278°N 13.594444°E
  - elevation: 32.3 m (106 ft) (45.2 m (148 ft) altitude difference)
- Length: 31.8 km (19.8 mi)
- Basin size: 216 km^{2} (83 mi^{2})

Basin features
- Progression: Spree→ Havel→ Elbe→ North Sea
- Tributaries
  - right: Zochegraben

The Erpe is a tributary of Spree River in Brandenburg and Berlin, Germany. The upper third is also known als Langes Elsenfließ ("Long Lizzy-Flow"), the lower two-thirds for about half a century were noted as Neuenhagener Mühlenfließ. Previously they had been one of several Mühlenfließe ("Mill Flows") without a specification. The course itself is quite natural, but it suffers pollution from a purification plant. Like the entire landscape in Brandenburg and Berlin, the course of the river is also shaped by the last ice age.

== River course ==
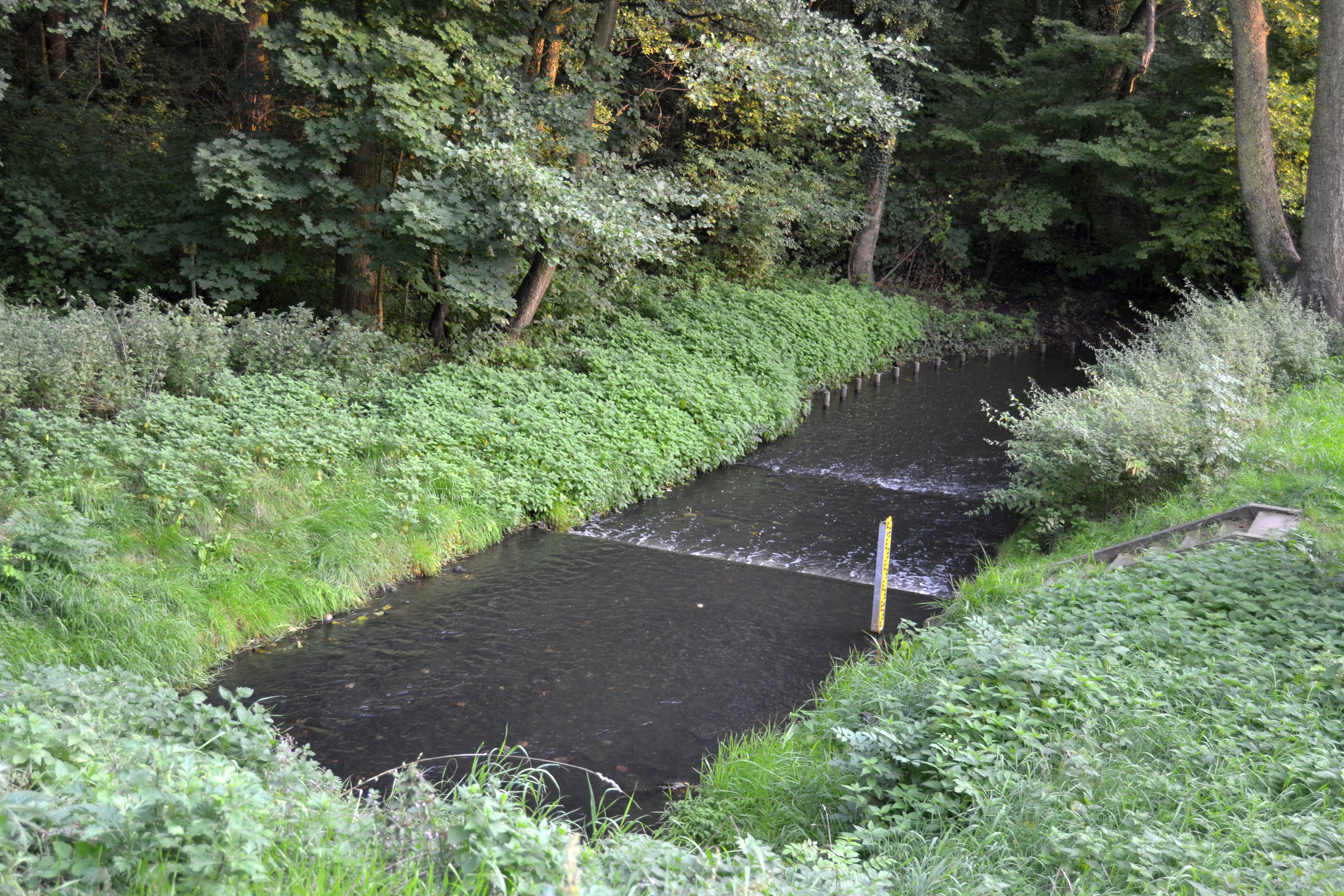
The Erpe, here also called Neuenhagener Mühlenfliess, in Hoppegarten

The spring stream Stienitzfiß comes from a wet area in the north-east of Werneuchen. The Hohe Graben flows out from the west at the centre of the small town, and from here the name "Langes Elsenfliess" is entered in older maps.

At the Amtsfreiheit farm in the west of Altlandsberg, an inlet flows from the left which unites the Altlandsberger Mühlenfiß and the Wederfiß, which rise close to each other in the Altlandsberg district of Wegendorf. From this estuary onwards, the Erpe is also called the "Neuenhagener Mühlenfiß". In Altlandsberg it flows west past the old town centre and east of the Seeberg settlement, in Neuenhagen near Berlin between the actual Neuenhagen and the district of Bollendorf. In Hoppegarten, the Zochegraben opens out to the south of the racecourse from the right, and the Wernergraben to the south of the B1. Further south, the sewage treatment plant drain from the Münchehofe sewage treatment plant drains into the river from the east.

To the east of the Waldesruh settlement, the body of water reaches the area of Berlin-Friedrichshagen and Köpenick.

In maps from the first half of the 20th century, the valley in Friedrichshagen is referred to as "Erpetal", but the body of water itself is referred to as "Mühlenfiß" (without an additional name), and in the second half of the century as "Neuenhagener Mühlenfiß". In the Friedrichshagen district of Hirschgarten, the Erpe divides into the "Neue Erpe" and "Alte Erpe" shortly before its confluence. The Neue Erpe flows into the Spree next to the Salvador-Allende Bridge, the Alte Erpe a little further west into an arm of the Spree, the northern tributary of the Baumgarteninsel.

The open meadow landscape of the Erpe Valley is one of the few preserved river valleys in Berlin. However, discharges from the Münchehofe sewage treatment plant in 2010 polluted the water and cause the Erpe to repeatedly foam. As the European Water Framework Directive requires an ecologically clean state of the water by 2015, the Berlin and Brandenburg water administrations therefore planned to take appropriate measures.

== Erpetal ==
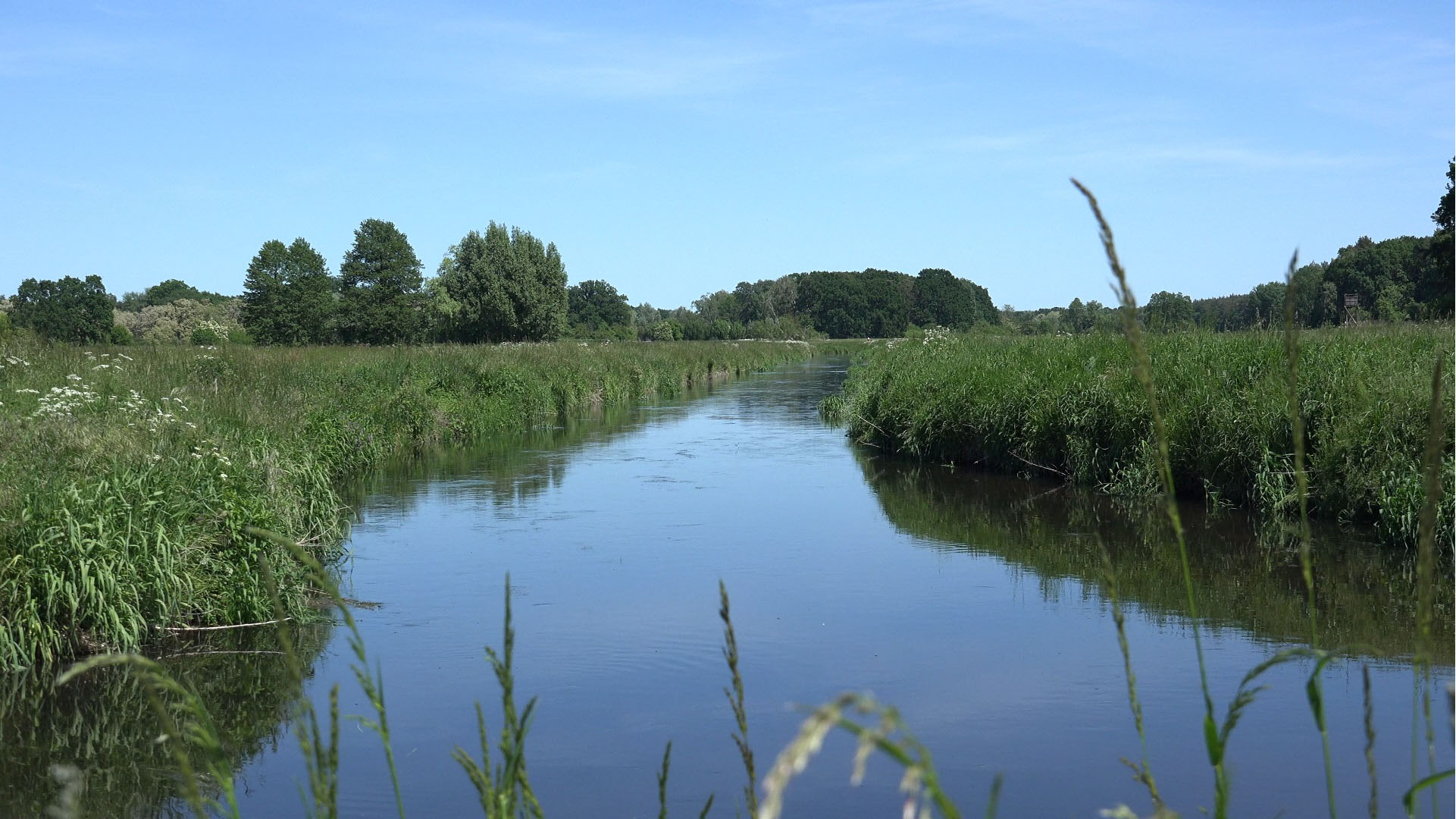
Erpe in the Erpetal nature reserve

Between Dahlwitz-Hoppegarten and Berlin-Friedrichshagen, the river flows through the meadows of the Erpe Valley. In 1957 it was declared a protected landscape area, and since 2003 the part of the Neuenhagen Mühlenfließes in the districts of Neuenhagen and Dahlwitz-Hoppegarten has been a nature reserve.

The European long-distance hiking trail E11 runs through the Erpe Valley.

== See also ==
- List of rivers of Brandenburg
