= Wittstock =

- Town
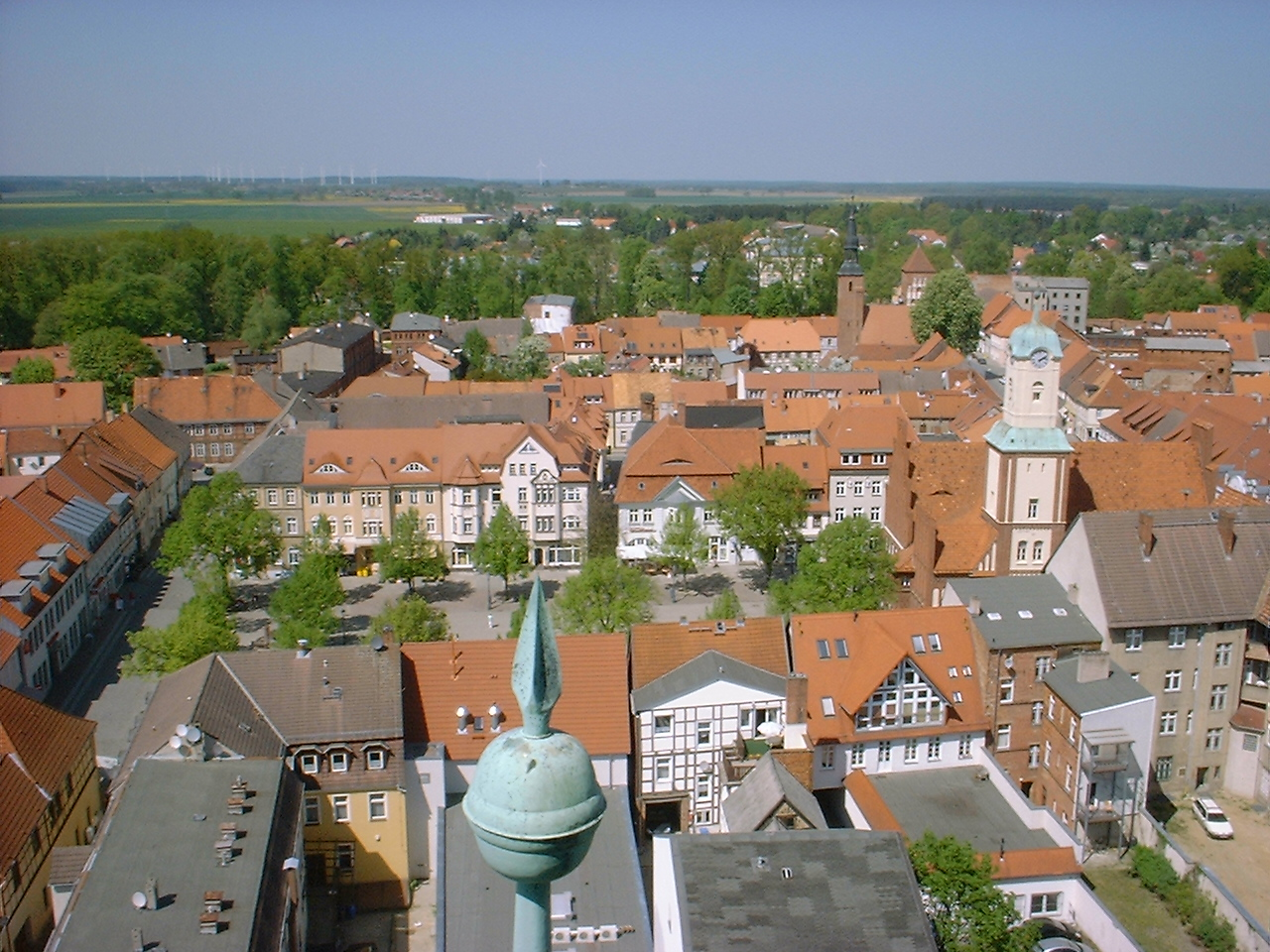
- Town centre

- Coat of arms

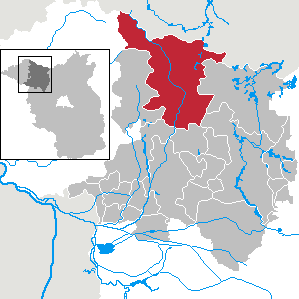
- Location of Wittstock within Ostprignitz-Ruppin district
- Interactive map of Wittstock
- Location within Germany Location within Brandenburg
- Coordinates: 53°9′49″N 12°29′8″E
- Country: Germany
- State: Brandenburg
- District: Ostprignitz-Ruppin
- Subdivisions: 19

Government
  - Mayor (2023–31): Phillipp Wacker

Area
  - Total: 420.24 km^{2} (162.26 sq mi)
- Elevation: 65 m (213 ft)

Population (2025-12-31)
  - Total: 13,642
  - Density: 32.462/km^{2} (84.077/sq mi)
- Time zone: UTC+01:00 (CET)
  - Summer (DST): UTC+02:00 (CEST)
- Postal codes: 16909
- Dialling codes: 03394
- Vehicle registration: OPR, KY, NP, WK
- Website: www.wittstock.de

Wittstock/Dosse (German pronunciation: [ˈvɪtˌʃtɔk]) is a town in the Ostprignitz-Ruppin district, in north-western Brandenburg, Germany.

== Geography ==
It is located in the eastern Prignitz region on the Dosse River near the confluence with its Glinze tributary, about 20 kilometres (12 mi) east of Pritzwalk and 95 kilometres (59 mi) northwest of Berlin. Wittstock is situated in a terminal moraine landscape south of the Mecklenburg Lake District.

=== Town structure ===
After the incorporation of several suburban villages in December 1993 and again in October 2003, Wittstock became the 6th largest town in Germany by area. However, the former independent districts Herzsprung and Königsberg, which were forced to be integrated in 2003, regained their independence in 2004, claiming that the compulsive integration was void because of a clerical error. Both districts were still under the overview of the department of Wittstock. Since 2005, Herzsprung and Königsberg are parts of the commune Heiligengrabe, so the size of the town decreased.

The current districts of Wittstock/Dosse:

- Babitz
- Berlinchen
- Biesen
- Christdorf
- Dossow
- Dranse
- Fretzdorf
- Freyenstein with commune part Neu Cölln
- Gadow
- Goldbeck
- Groß Haßlow with commune parts Klein Haßlow and Randow
- Niemerlang with commune parts Tetschendorf and Ackerfelde
- Rossow
- Schweinrich
- Sewekow
- Wittstock (Kernstadt)
- Wulfersdorf
- Zempow
- Zootzen

=== Demography ===
Development of population since 1875 within the current Boundaries (Blue Line: Population; Dotted Line: Comparison to Population development in Brandenburg state; Grey Background: Time of Nazi Germany; Red Background: Time of communist East Germany)

Recent Population Development and Projections (Population Development before Census 2011 (blue line); Recent Population Development according to the Census in Germany in 2011 (blue bordered line); Official projections for 2005-2030 (yellow line); for 2017-2030 (scarlet line); for 2020-2030 (green line)

Wittstock/Dosse: Population development
within the current boundaries (2020)

Year	Pop.	±% p.a.
1875	15,434	—
1890	15,366	−0.03%
1910	14,873	−0.16%
1925	15,045	+0.08%
1939	16,538	+0.68%
1950	20,700	+2.06%
1964	17,717	−1.11%

Year	Pop.	±% p.a.
1971	17,912	+0.16%
1981	19,022	+0.60%
1985	19,903	+1.14%
1990	20,056	+0.15%
1995	20,164	+0.11%
2000	17,985	−2.26%
2005	16,363	−1.87%

Year	Pop.	±% p.a.
2010	15,235	−1.42%
2015	14,380	−1.15%
2016	14,291	−0.62%
2017	14,283	−0.06%
2018	14,198	−0.60%
2019	14,131	−0.47%
2020	14,007	−0.88%

== History ==
Wittstock resulted from a Slavic settlement and was first mentioned in the deed of formation for the Bishopric of Havelberg in 946. The name is possibly derived from vysoka ("high-lying") in the language of the local Polabian tribes, it was later Germanized into Wiztok (1271), Witzstock (1284) and Witstock (1441), adapted folk-etymologically to Low German witt ("white") and stock ("rootstock").

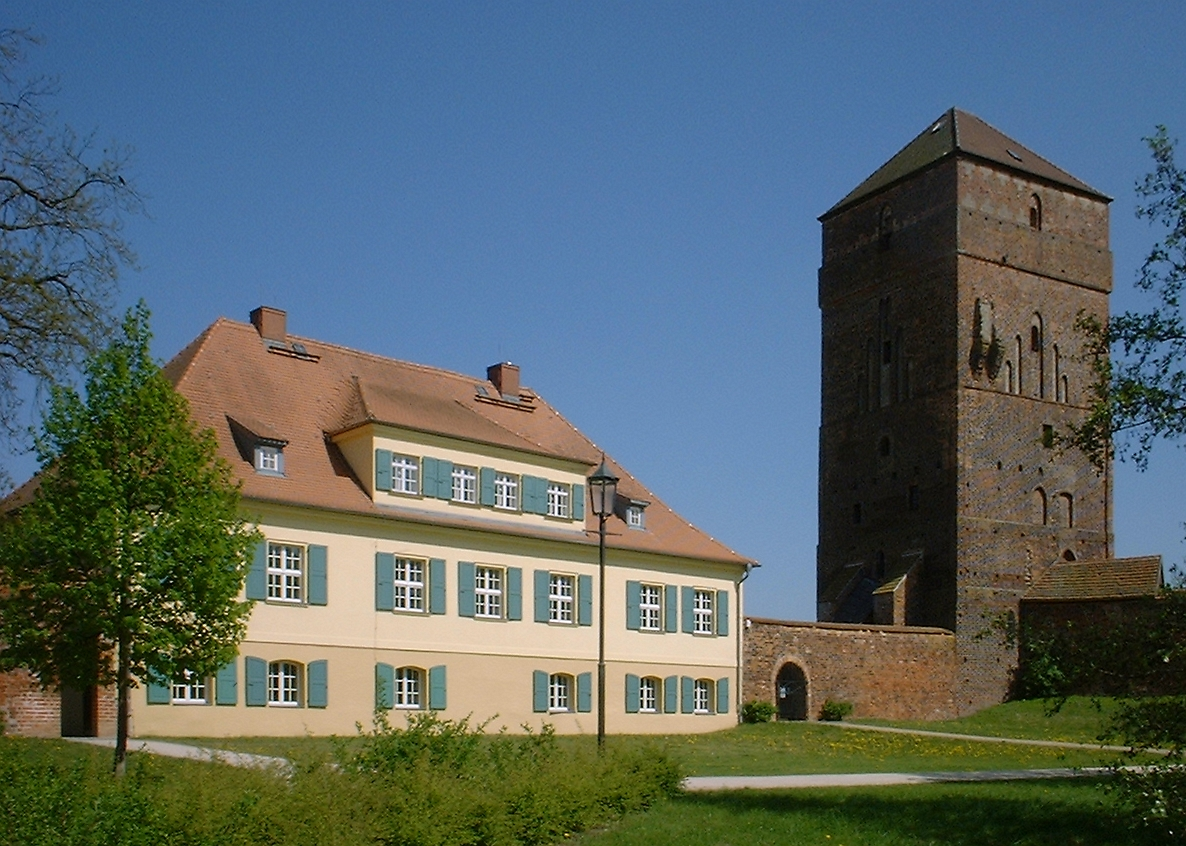
Bishop's Castle

Obtaining the Stendal town charter on 13 September 1248 from the hands of the Havelberg Prince-bishop Henry I, it is one of the oldest towns of Brandenburg. In 1251, Wittstock received an imprint of the town seal, which was one of the oldest in Brandenburg, too. Wittstock Castle, which had been built from 1244 onwards onto a Slavic foundation, served as the residence of the Havelberg Prince-bishops from 1271; it is therefore also designated Old Bishop Castle (Alte Bischofsburg). The Havelberg era ended with the Protestant Reformation and the death of the last Catholic Prince-bishop Busso von Alvensleben at Wittstock Castle in 1548.

Up to the Thirty Years' War, the fortress was a secure stronghold—until it became the site of the 1636 Battle of Wittstock, when the troops of the Swedish Empire under Field Marshals Johan Banér and Alexander Leslie defeated the allied Imperial and Saxon forces under Elector John George I of Saxony. Followed by the outbreak of a plague epidemic two years later, Wittstock remained devastated and lost about half of its population.

The redevelopment of the town was launched by the "Great Elector" Frederick William in 1658. About 1750, numerous colonists descending from Württemberg and the Palatinate settled the region.

== Politics ==
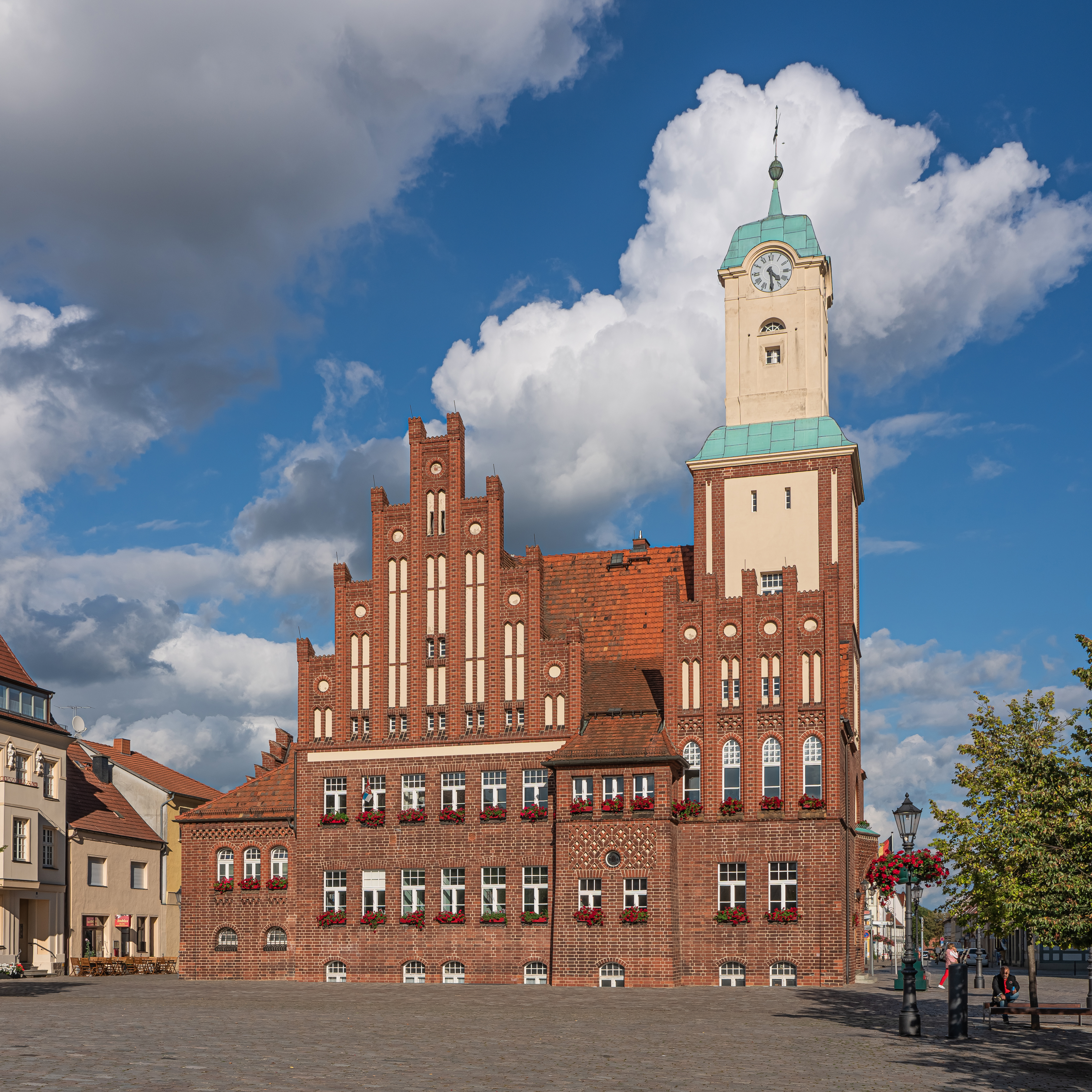
Town hall

Seats in the town's assembly (Stadtverordnetenversammlung) as of 2019 local elections:

- Christian Democratic Union: 6
- Free Voters Prignitz-Ruppin: 4
- The Left: 4
- Social Democratic Party of Germany (SPD): 4
- Farmers' association voting bloc: 2
- Alliance 90/The Greens: 1
- Free Democratic Party: 1

== Sports ==
Wolfe Wittstock is a motorcycle speedway club that competes in Polish 2nd Division (3rd level of the Polish league system)

== Twin town ==
Wittstock is twinned with:

- Höganäs in Sweden (since 2004)
- Uetersen in Germany (since 1990)

== Sights ==
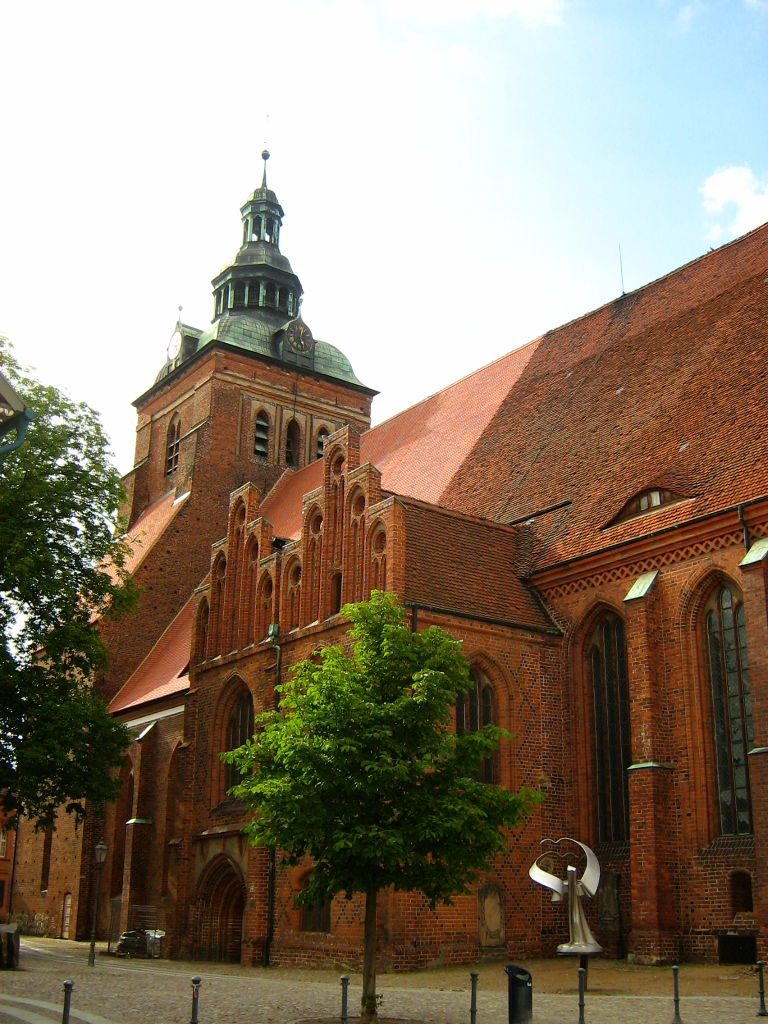
St Mary's Church

The town's main historic monument is the Brick Gothic St Mary's Church, dating back to c. 1240. Significantly enlarged as a hall church in the late 13th century and repleted with a carved altar by Claus Berg, it was used as a cathedral by the Havelberg bishops.

The Bishop's Castle was greatly restored in the 1990s and today houses a Thirty Years' War museum. Much of the elaborate late medieval defences still surround the old centre, including a 13th-century gate tower, the Daberburg bergfried north of the town, and a 2,500 metres (8,200 ft) long city wall. The wall's height, originally 11 metres (36 ft), today is about 4 to 7 metres.

== Personality ==
=== Freemen ===
- Kurt Zellmer, Superintendent: December 12, 2009
- Wolfgang Dost, historian, in honor of his contributions to the cultural life of the city: September 24, 2011

=== Sons and daughters of the town ===
- Ellen Streidt (born 1952), sprinter, medalist at the 1976 Summer Olympics
- Ina Muhss (born 1957), politician (SPD), since 2010 a member of the Brandenburg Landtag
- Thomas Skulski (born 1959), journalist and television presenter
- Egmont Hamelow (born 1963), local politician (CDU)

=== Personalities who were active in ===
- Friedrich Hermann Lütkemüller (1815-1897), organ builder, lived from 1844 until his death in Wittstock

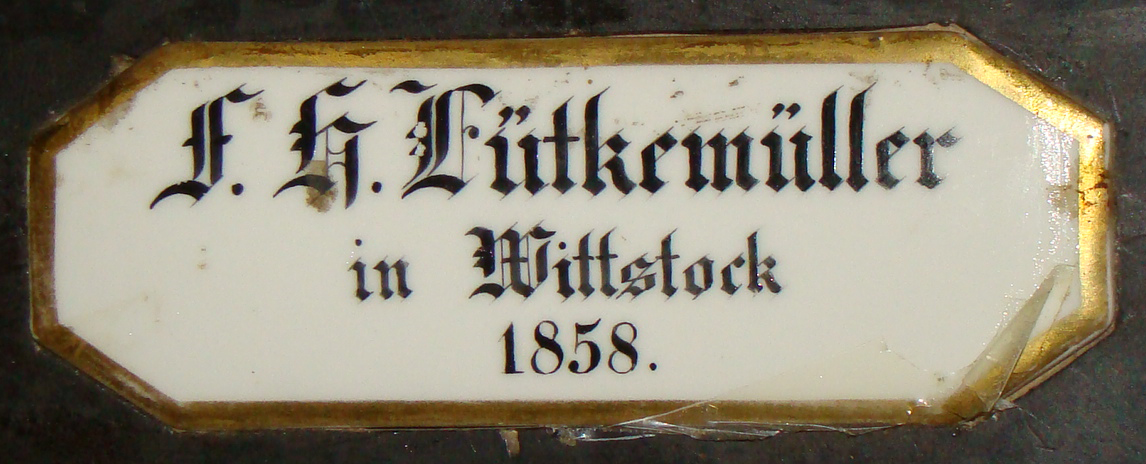
Plate on organ

- Melli Beese (1886-1925), Germany's first female pilot, was here during First World War interned along with her husband Charles Boutard

=== Medal ===
The Medal of Honor Wittstock was awarded to:

- 2010 Regina Melzer for services within the People's Solidarity and Wolfgang Wilcke for his involvement in the turnaround time
