= Uska Luke =

River in Germany

Coordinates: 51°51′27″N 13°59′33″E

Location
- Country: Germany
- State: Brandenburg

Uska Luke is a river of Brandenburg, Germany.

== See also ==
- List of rivers of Brandenburg
