= Jeetzbach =

River in Germany

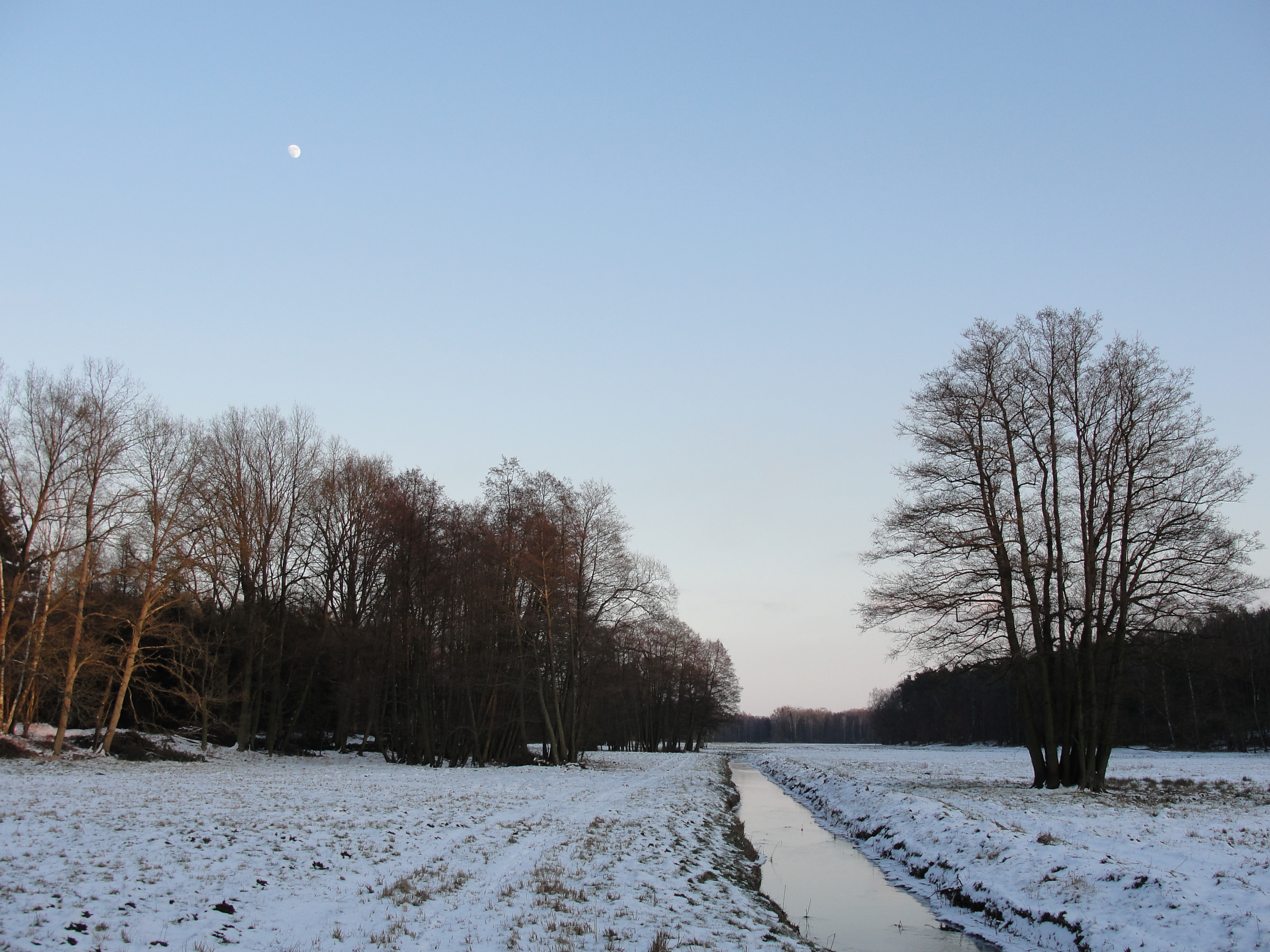

Location
- Country: Germany
- States: Brandenburg

Physical characteristics
- Mouth
  - location: Stepenitz
  - coordinates: 53.0400°N 11.8467°E
- Length: 16 km (9.9 mi)

Basin features
- Progression: Stepenitz→ Elbe→ North Sea

Jeetzbach is a river of Brandenburg, Germany. It is a tributary of the Stepenitz, which it joins near Perleberg.

== See also ==
- List of rivers of Brandenburg
