= Berste =

River in Germany

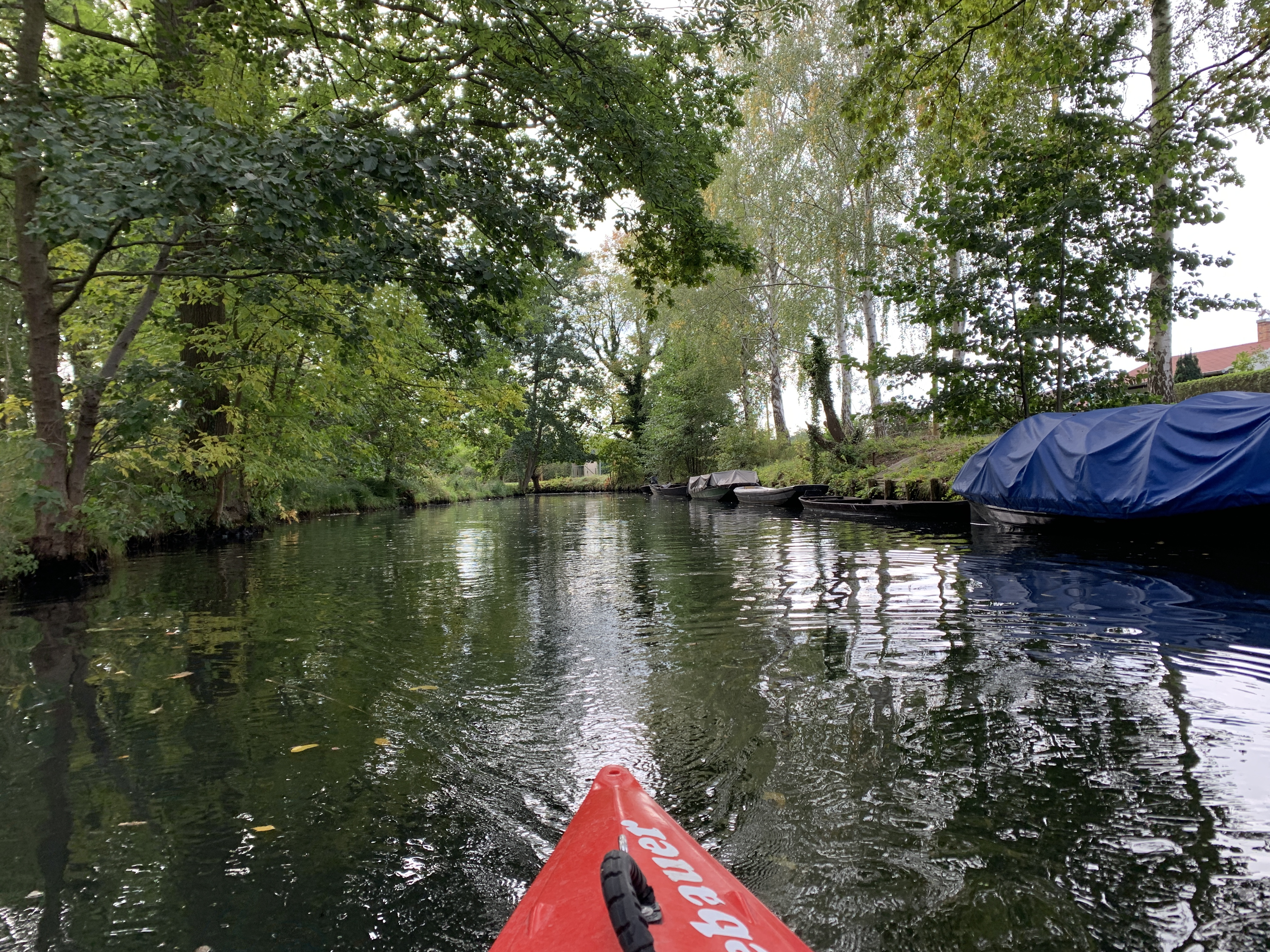

Location
- Country: Germany
- State: Brandenburg

Physical characteristics
- Mouth
  - location: Spree
  - coordinates: 51.9499°N 13.8949°E

Basin features
- Progression: Spree→ Havel→ Elbe→ North Sea

Berste is a river of Brandenburg, Germany. It flows into the Spree near Lübben.

== See also ==
- List of rivers of Brandenburg
