= Bäke (Telte) =

River in Germany

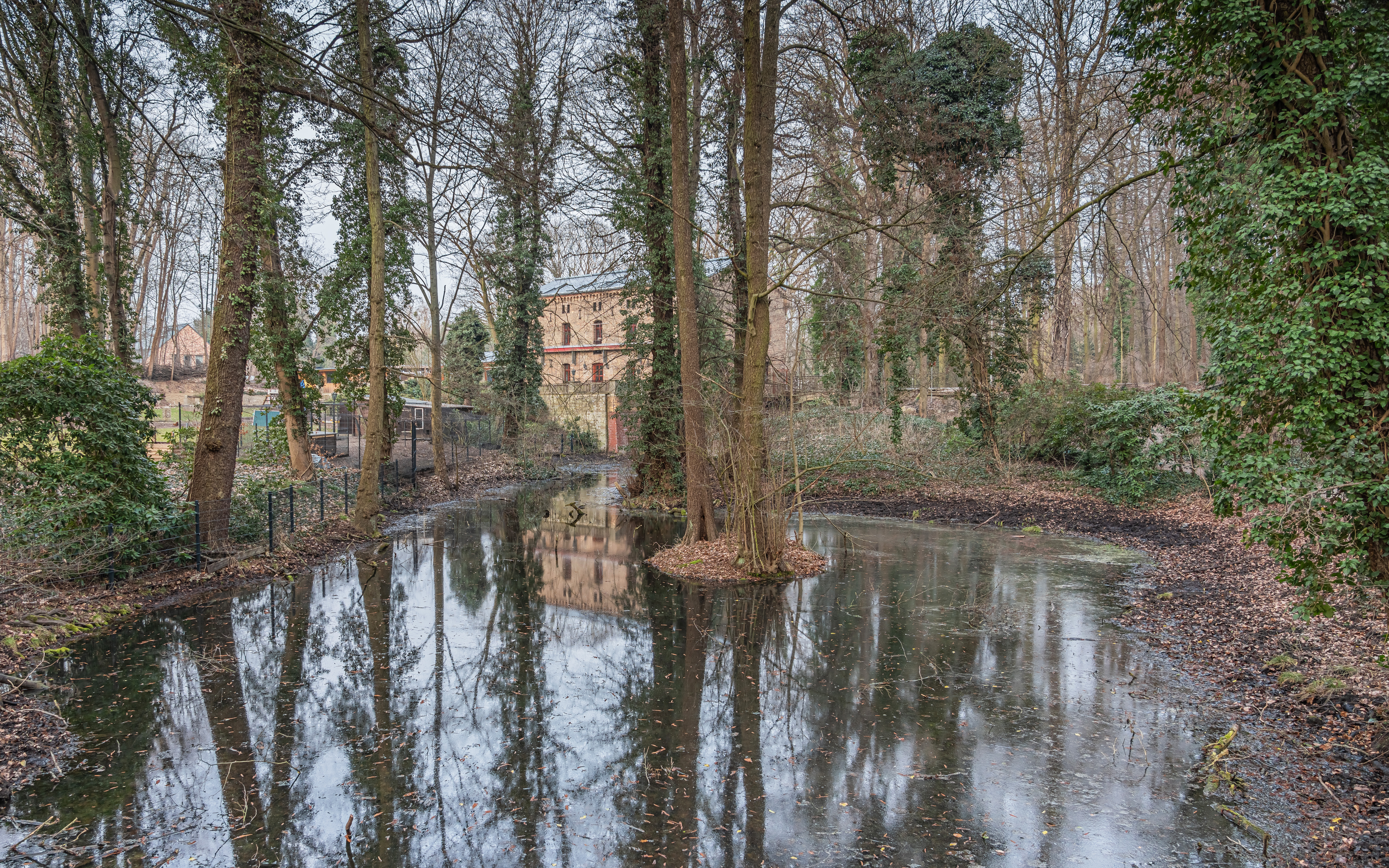

Location
- Country: Germany
- Location: Berlin, Brandenburg

Physical characteristics
- Mouth: Teltow Canal
  - coordinates: 52°23′43″N 13°12′23″E

Basin features
- Progression: Teltow Canal→ Havel→ Elbe→ North Sea

The Bäke (formerly: Telte) is a river of Berlin and Brandenburg, Germany.

The river has been moved largely into the Teltow Canal, which was constructed between 1900 and 1906.

== See also ==
- List of rivers of Brandenburg
