= Spremberg Dam =

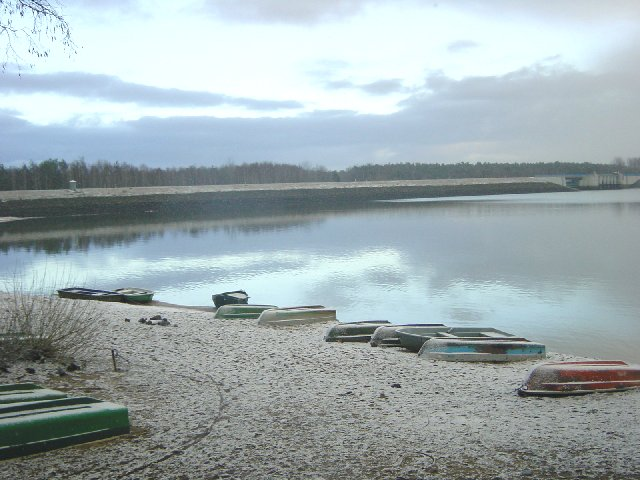
- Interactive map of Spremberg Dam
- Location: Spree-Neiße district (near Cottbus, Spremberg)
- Coordinates: 51°38′49″N 14°23′41″E
- Construction began: 1958 - 1965

Dam and spillways
- Impounds: Spree
- Height (foundation): 20.2 m (66 ft)
- Height (thalweg): 12 m (39 ft)
- Length: 3,700 m (12,100 ft)
- Elevation at crest: 96.15 m (315.5 ft)
- Width (crest): 5 m (16 ft)
- Dam volume: 1.1 MCM

Reservoir
- Active capacity: 42.7 MCM
- Catchment area: 2,239 km^{2} (864 sq mi)
- Surface area: 9.33 km^{2} (3.60 sq mi)
- Normal elevation: 92.00 m (301.84 ft)

Power Station
- Installed capacity: 1 MW

Spremberg Dam (German: Talsperre Spremberg; Lower Sorbian: Grodkojska zawera) and its associated reservoir (Spremberger Stausee; Grodkojski spety jazor) lie between Cottbus and Spremberg and impound the River Spree. Together with the surrounding countryside they make up the protected landscape also known as the Talsperre Spremberg. The dam itself is made of earth and is the only one in the state of Brandenburg that counts as a "large dam". Its purposes are industrial water supply, flood protection, electricity generation, drought protection and recreation. It was taken into service on 8 October 1965.
