= Nieden =

- Municipality
- Location of Nieden within Vorpommern-Greifswald district
- Interactive map of Nieden
- Location within Germany Location within Mecklenburg-Vorpommern
- Coordinates: 53°26′22″N 13°55′21″E
- Country: Germany
- State: Mecklenburg-Vorpommern
- District: Vorpommern-Greifswald
- Municipal assoc.: Uecker-Randow-Tal

Government
  - Mayor: Roswitha Retzlaff

Area
  - Total: 6.49 km^{2} (2.51 sq mi)
- Elevation: 25 m (82 ft)

Population (2025-12-31)
  - Total: 157
  - Density: 24.2/km^{2} (62.7/sq mi)
- Time zone: UTC+01:00 (CET)
  - Summer (DST): UTC+02:00 (CEST)
- Postal codes: 17309
- Dialling codes: 039740
- Vehicle registration: VG
- Website: www.amt-uecker-randow-tal.de

Nieden (Polabian Nadam) is a municipality in the Vorpommern-Greifswald district, in Mecklenburg-Vorpommern, Germany.

== Geography ==
Nieden, one of the smallest towns in the surrounding district, lies on a relatively flat glacial moraine on the east bank of the Uecker river. The town is on the state line of Brandenburg and is about halfway between the cities of Pasewalk und Prenzlau.

== History ==
The first mention of the original name of the town, Nedam was in 1121. Already in the 6th century Nieden was an important Slavic fortress. To secure the town and surrounding area from Polish attacks, the Duke of Pommerania built s castle in Nieden. In approximately 1600 the estate was inherited by the family von Winterfeld, along with the estates of Schmarsow, Damerow, Spiegelberg, Rollwitz and Züsedom. In the 1920s the family built a field stone manor house featuring a tower and a park of many acres that stretched to the bank of the Uecker river. The manor house burned down in 1945, but the surrounding land is still in possession of the family.

On July 25, 1952, Nieden, along with several other communities from the province of Brandenburg were reorganized into the district of Neubrandenburg.
