= Schwärze =

River in Germany

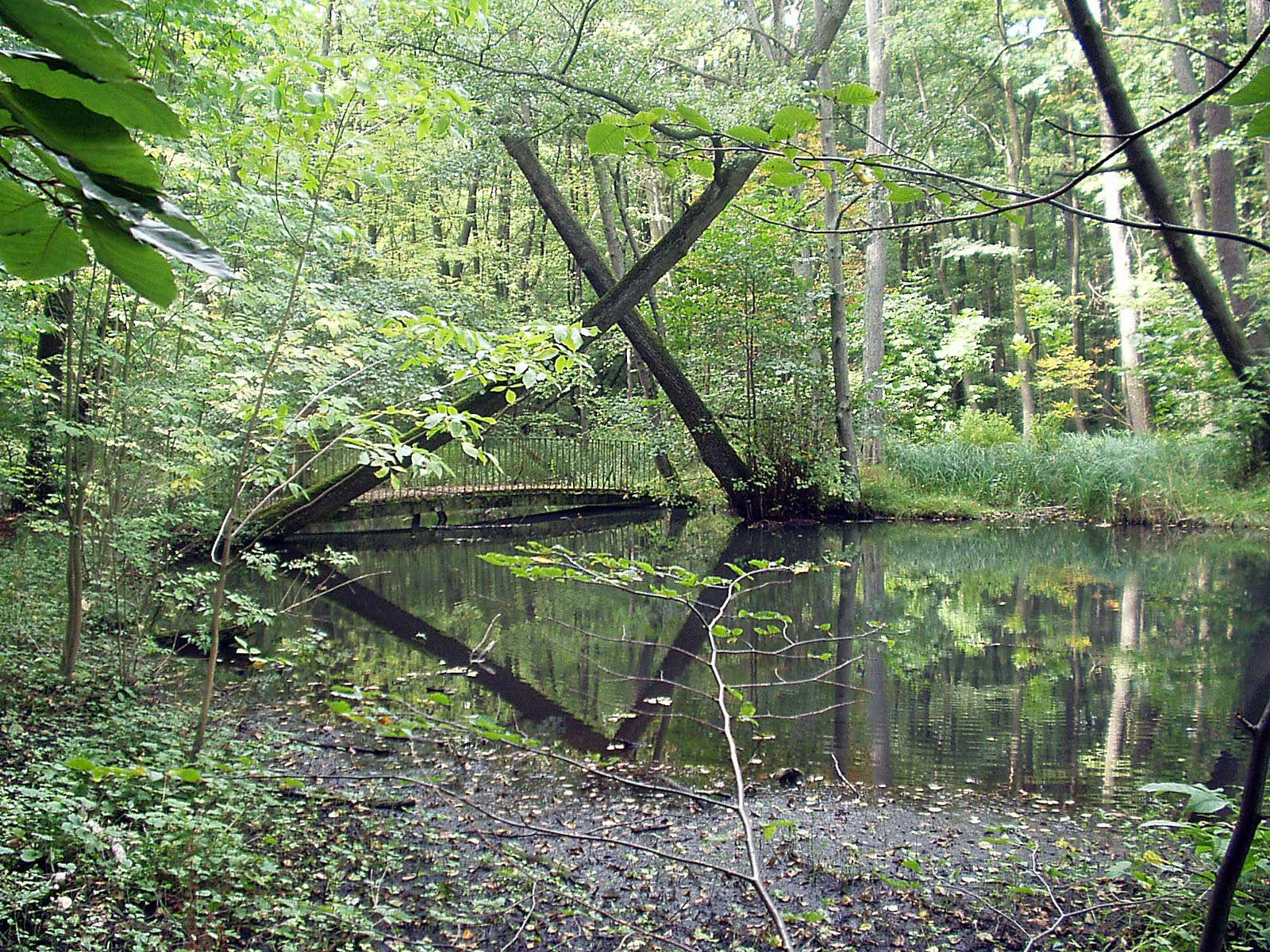

Location
- Country: Germany
- States: Brandenburg

Physical characteristics
- Mouth
  - location: Finow Canal
  - coordinates: 52.8256°N 13.8181°E

Basin features
- Progression: Finow Canal→ Oder→ Baltic Sea

Schwärze is a river of Brandenburg, Germany. It flows into the Finow Canal, which discharges into the Oder, in Eberswalde.

== See also ==
- List of rivers of Brandenburg
