= Uecker (surname) =

Uecker is a German surname. Notable people with the surname include:

- Bob Uecker (1934–2025), American baseball player and commentator
- Georg Uecker (born 1962), German actor
- Gerd Uecker (1946–2024), German opera artistic director
- Günther Uecker (1930–2025), German painter, sculptor, and installation artist
- Heiko Uecker (1939–2019), German philologist
- Joe Uecker (born 1954), American politician
- John Uecker (1946–2022), American actor and theatre director
- Keith Uecker (born 1960), American football player
- Korliss Uecker, American operatic soprano
- Sabine Uecker (born 1943), German politician
