= Uecker (river) =

River in Germany

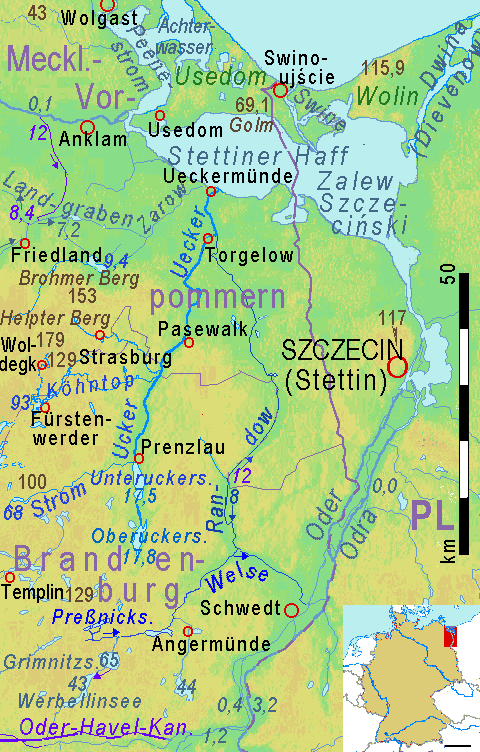
- The rivers Ucker/Uecker, Randow, and Welse

Location
- Country: Germany

Physical characteristics
- Source
  - location: Temmen-Ringenwalde
  - coordinates: 53°4′5″N 13°42′49″E
  - elevation: 76 m (249 ft)
- Mouth
  - location: Oder Lagoon
  - coordinates: 53°45′0″N 14°4′1.2″E
- Length: 98 km (61 mi)
- Basin size: 2,200 km^{2} (850 sq mi)

The Uecker (German pronunciation: [ˈʏkɐ]) or Ucker ([ˈʊkɐ]) is a river in the northeastern German states of Brandenburg, where it is known as the Ucker, and of Mecklenburg-Vorpommern. It flows northward from Uckermark to the Oder Lagoon.

== Path ==
Its source lies in the Uckermark district, one kilometer north of Ringenwalde. It flows northward through several lakes. The first one is Großer Krinertsee. The next ones are rather small.

Then there are two large lakes, Lake Oberuckersee and Lake Unteruckersee, joined by the navigable section of the river, called der Kanal, with the smaller Lake Möllensee in between. The island within Oberuckersee was the residence of a Slavic ruler in the 10th century, and connected to the coast of the lake by a long wooden bridge. On the northern end of Unteruckersee the city of Prenzlau is situated, nowadays the district capital of Uckermark. In Middle Ages, it was granted urban rights by the Pomeranian Griffins earlier than Szczecin in 1234, shortly before they lost the Uckermark to the Margraviate of Brandenburg in 1250.

Most of the course below Unteruckersee is not navigable. An effort of the von Arnim family to prepare it for large river boats ceased after a few decades in the 19th century. Between Prenzlau and the junction of the river Köhntop, it is sometimes even difficult to travel by canoe. Near the small village of Nieden, the river arrives in (Mecklenbuurg-) Hither Pomerania, where it is called Uecker. In this country, it passes through the towns of Pasewalk, Torgelow, and Eggesin. Pasewalk, as well as Prenzlau, features some important Brick Gothic architecture.

In Eggesin, the northern section of the river Randow discharges into the Uecker. In Ueckermünde, the Uecker ends in Szczecin Lagoon, which is connected to the Baltic Sea by the three straits Peenestrom, Świna and Dziwna.

The name Ucker originates from a West Slavic language, the word vikru/vikrus, meaning 'fast' or 'quick'. The Uecker gave its name to the Uckermark historical region and to the two districts Uckermark and Uecker-Randow.

== Gallery ==
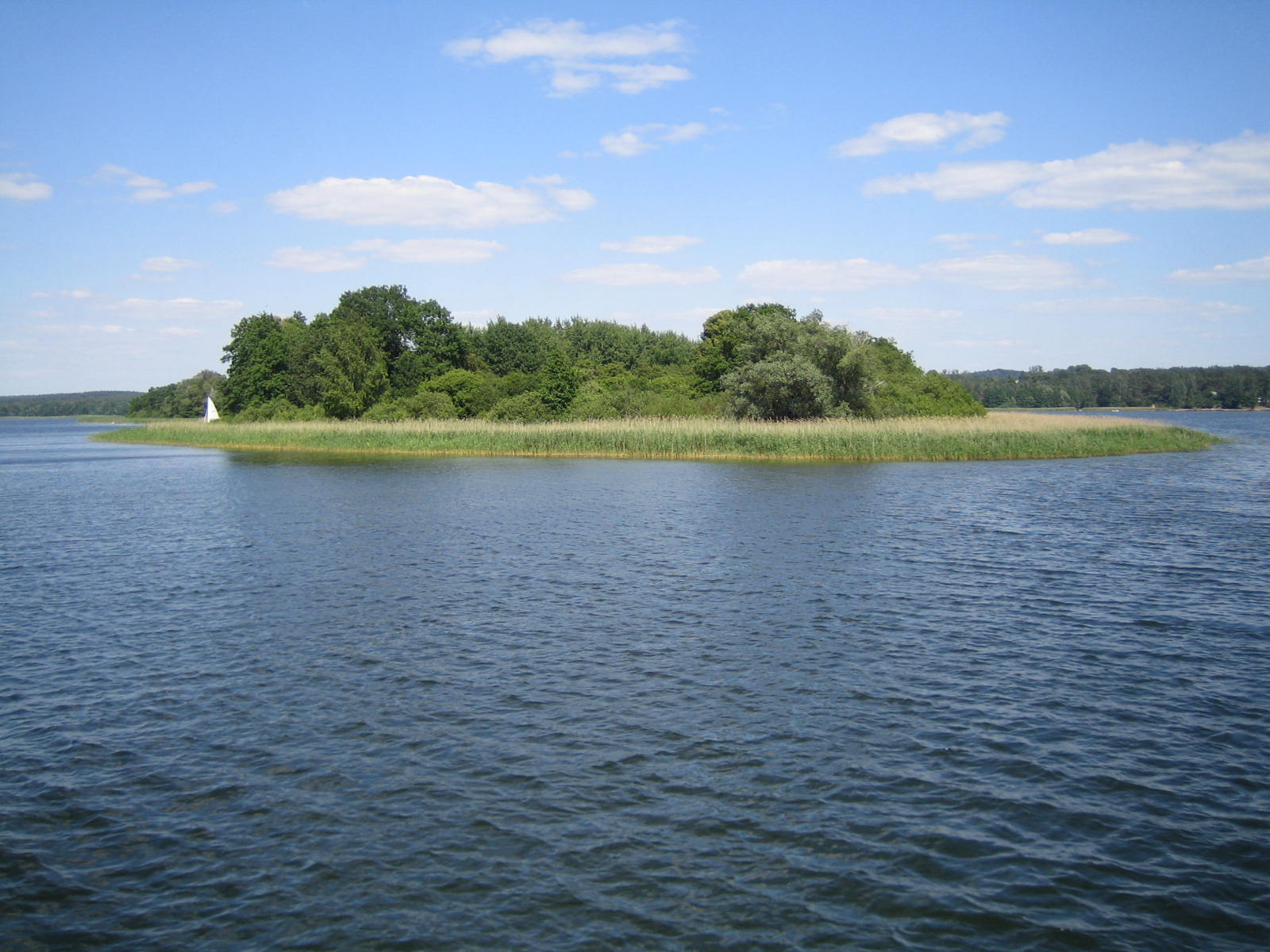
Island of the gord in Oberuckersee

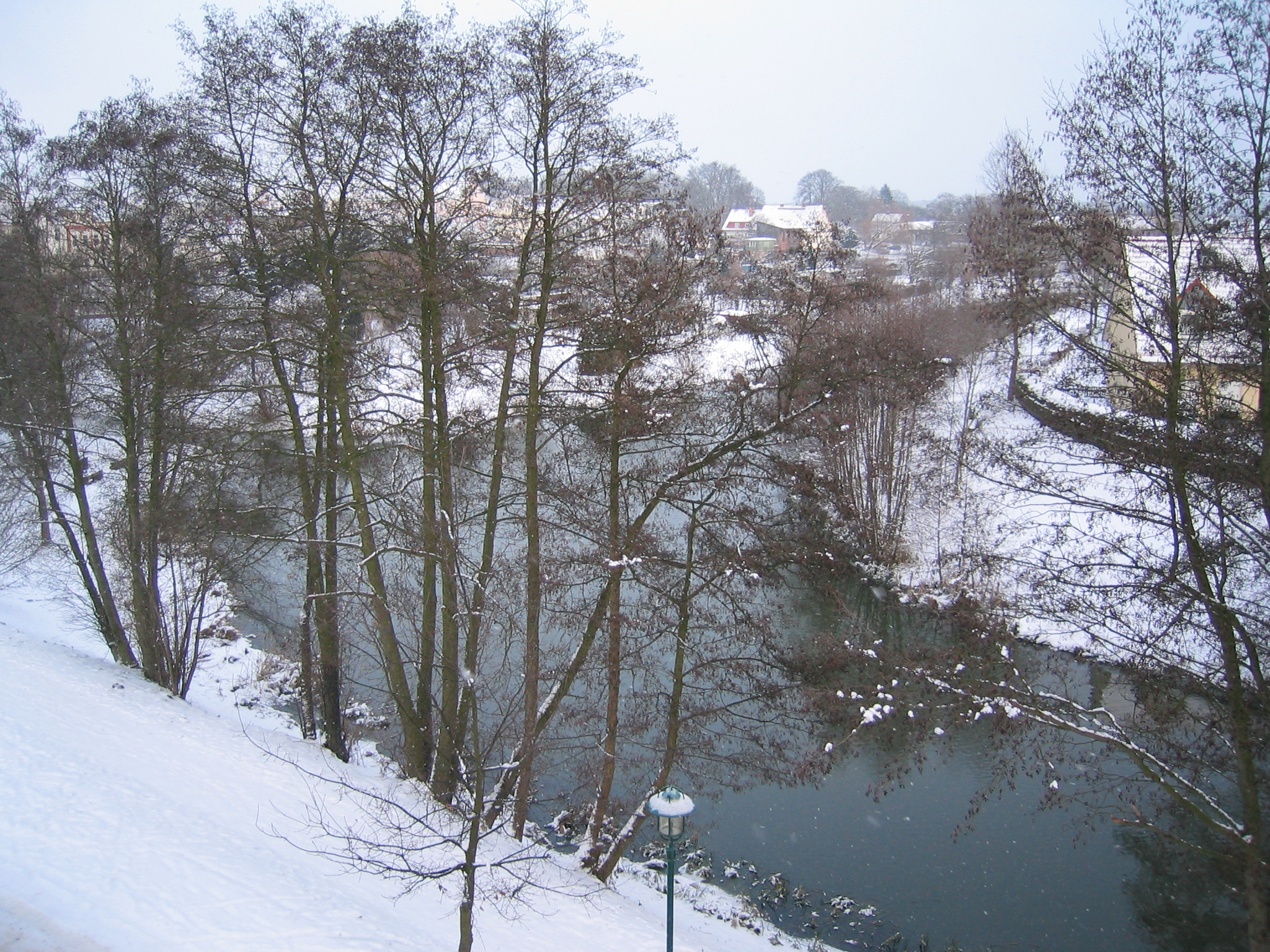
The Uecker near Torgelow

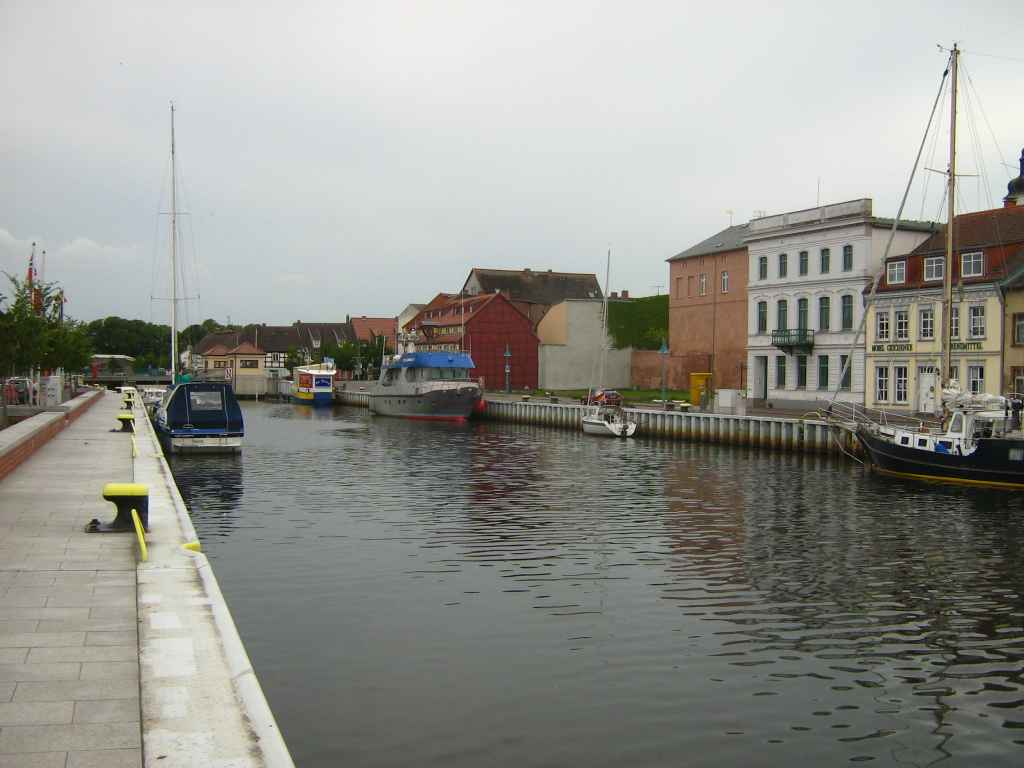
The Uecker in Ueckermünde
