= Welse =

River in Germany

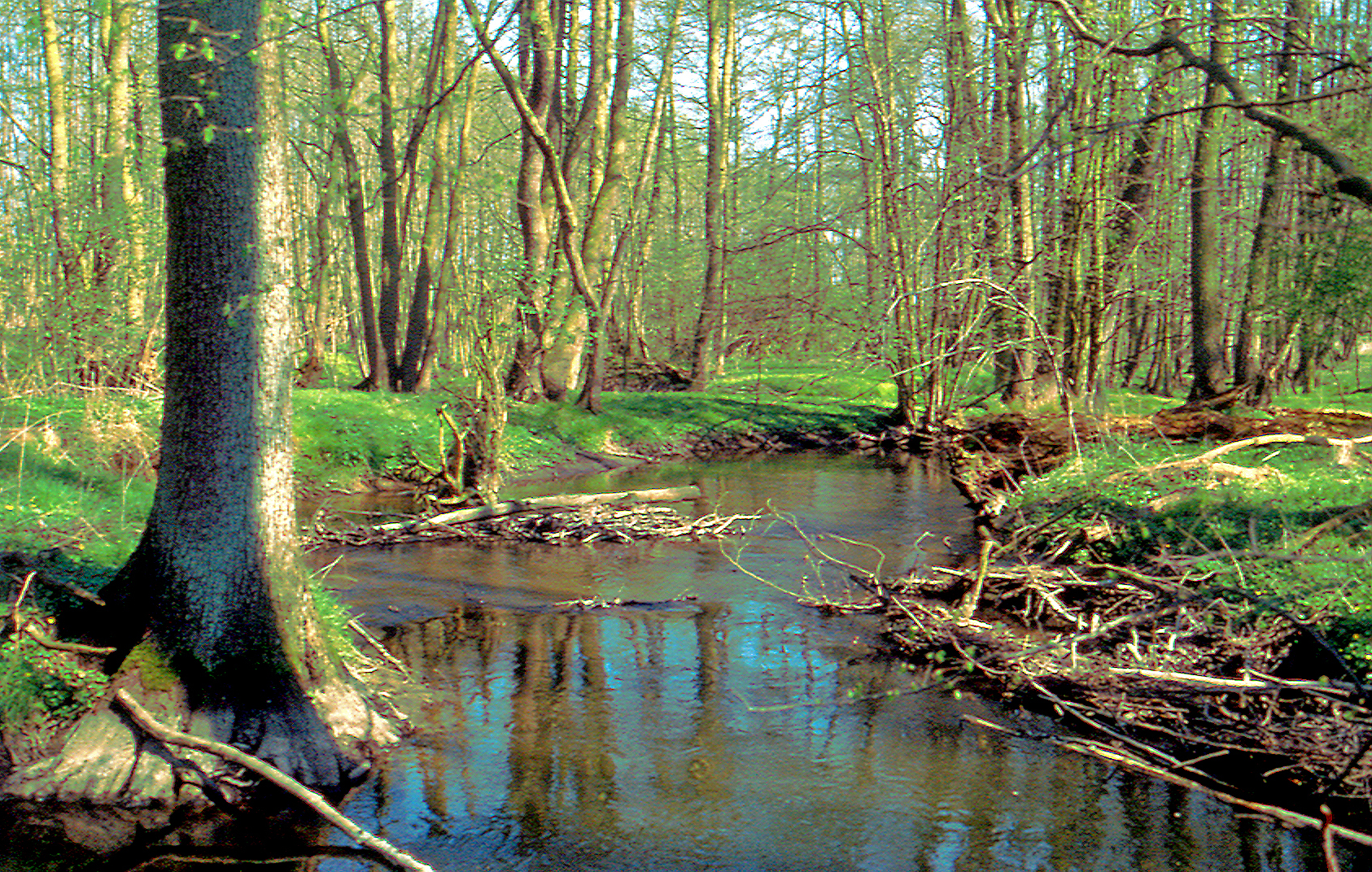

Location
- Country: Germany
- State: Brandenburg

Physical characteristics
- Mouth
  - location: Oder
  - coordinates: 53°05′36″N 14°19′18″E

Basin features
- Progression: Oder→ Baltic Sea

Welse is a river of Brandenburg, Germany. It flows into the Hohensaaten-Friedrichsthaler Wasserstraße, a shipping canal parallel to the Oder, north of Schwedt. It is 66 km long, and has its source 2 km northwest of the centre of Friedrichswalde about 73 m above sea level. After a flow path of 5.5 km, of which about 400 m are piped, the spring creek flows into the Großer Präßnicksee.

== See also ==
- List of rivers of Brandenburg
