= Dosse (river) =

River in Germany

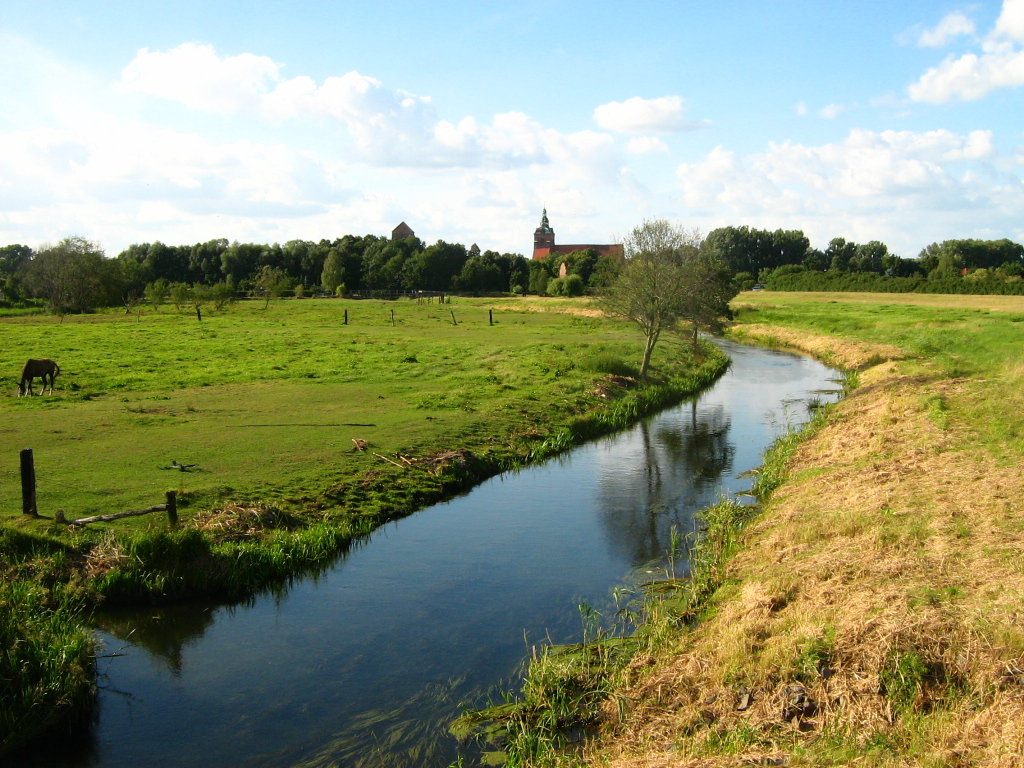

Location
- Country: Germany
- States: Saxony-Anhalt and Brandenburg

Physical characteristics
- Source
  - location: Brandenburg
- Mouth
  - location: Havel
  - coordinates: 52°47′42″N 12°12′45″E
- Length: 94 km (58 mi)
- Basin size: 1,268 km^{2} (490 sq mi)

Basin features
- Progression: Havel→ Elbe→ North Sea

The Dosse (German pronunciation: [ˈdɔsə]) is a river in the district of Ostprignitz-Ruppin in the northwestern part of Brandenburg, Germany. It is a right tributary of the Havel in Saxony-Anhalt.

The Dosse is 94 kilometres (58 mi) long, with its source on the border between Mecklenburg-Vorpommern and Brandenburg, arising out of three small brooks that unite after four kilometres. It flows generally south, through Wittstock, Wusterhausen, and Neustadt an der Dosse, before joining the Havel near Havelberg in Saxony-Anhalt. The total catchment area is 1,268 square kilometres (490 mi^{2}).

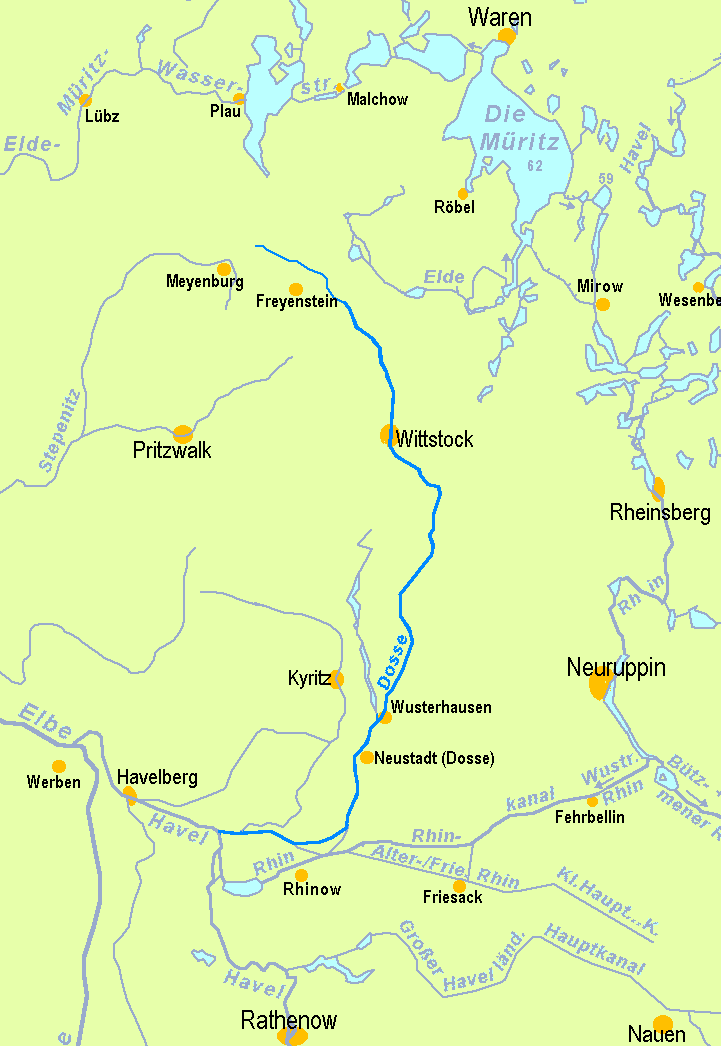
Course of the Dosse through Brandenburg and Saxony-Anhalt

With the town of Wittstock on its banks, the Dosse was the site of the 1636 Battle of Wittstock between Sweden and an alliance between Imperial and Saxon troops during the Thirty Years' War.

== See also ==
- List of rivers of Brandenburg
- List of rivers of Saxony-Anhalt
