= Satkula =

River in Germany

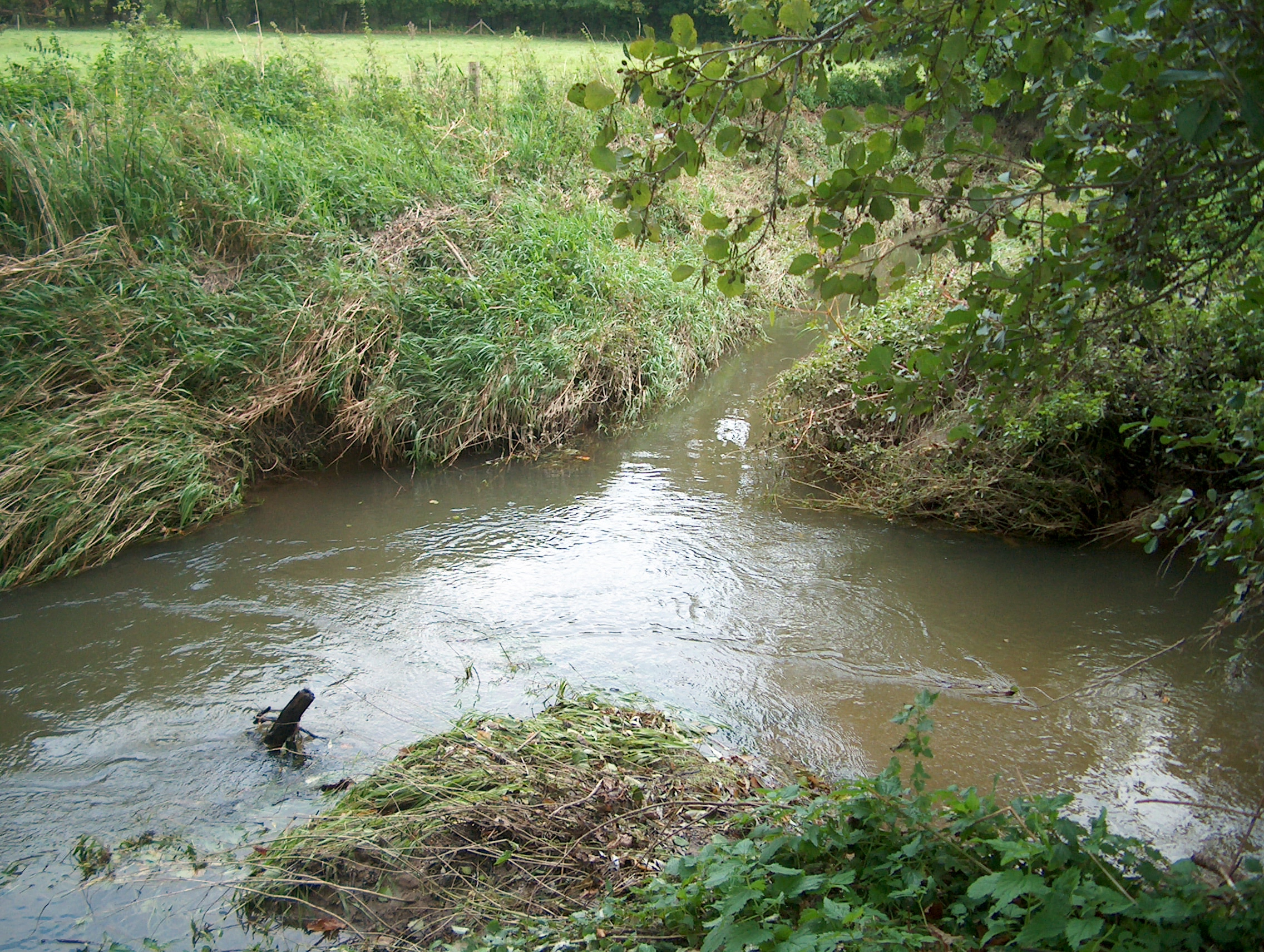
- The Satkula mouth to Klosterwasser near Räckelwitz

Location
- Country: Germany
- State: Saxony
- Region: Upper Lusatia

Physical characteristics
- Source
  - location: Upper Lusatia
- Mouth
  - location: Klosterwasser
  - coordinates: 51.2524°N 14.2294°E
- Length: ±11.4 km (7.1 mi)
- Basin size: 57 km^{2} (22 sq mi)
- Discharge
  - average: 1.01 m^{3}/s (36 cu ft/s)

Basin features
- Progression: Klosterwasser→ Black Elster→ Elbe→ North Sea

The Satkula is a small stream of Saxony, Germany. The source of the Satkula is located in the village Kleinhänchen, municipality of Burkau/Porchow, Lusatia, Germany, in the Lusatian Highlands (Lausitzer Bergland). It is a right tributary of the Klosterwasser, which it joins near Räckelwitz. Satkula is a symbolic river for Sorbs in Lusatia.

== See also ==
- List of rivers of Saxony
