= Černý potok =

Černý potok ("black stream") is the name of a number of minor rivers in the Czech Republic:

- Černý potok (Smědá)
- tributary of Úhlava
- tributary of Müglitz (river)
- tributary of Radbuza
- an alternative name of Teplá Vltava, one of the sources of the Vltava

== See also ==
- List of rivers of the Czech Republic
- Schwarzwasser (disambiguation)
