= Ruhlander Schwarzwasser =

River in Germany

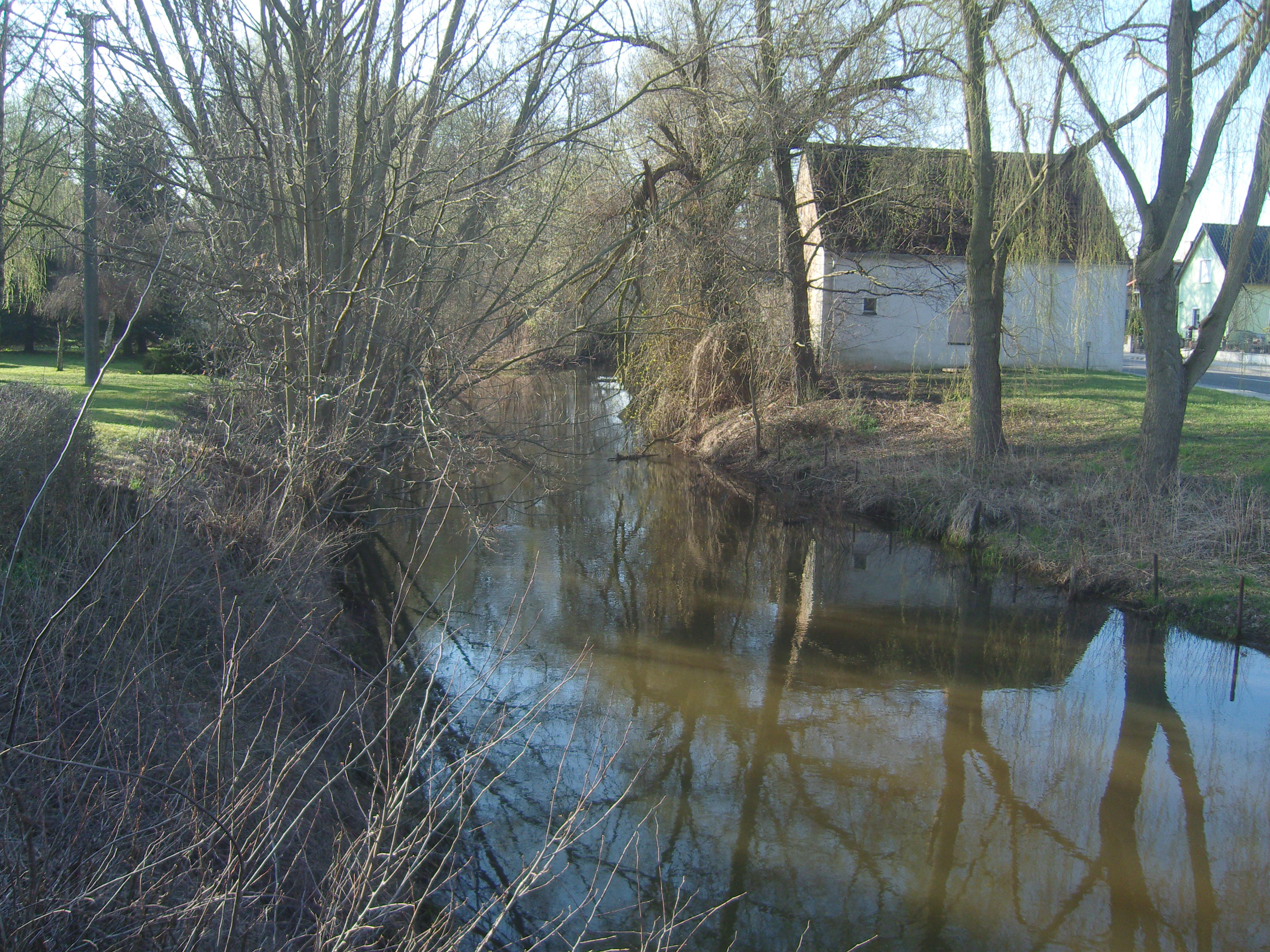
- The Ruhlander Schwarzwasser in Jannowitz

Location
- Country: Germany
- States: Saxony and Brandenburg
- Reference no.: DE: 53818

Physical characteristics
- Source
  - location: Source region: in the Bernsdorf municipal forest near Heide, part of Wiednitz
  - coordinates: 51°23′48″N 14°03′25″E
  - elevation: 146 m above sea level (NN)
- Mouth
  - location: near Ruhland into the Black Elster
  - coordinates: 51°27′50″N 13°48′56″E
  - elevation: 95 m above sea level (NN)
- Basin size: 269 km²

Basin features
- Progression: Black Elster → Elbe → North Sea
- River system: Elbe
- Tributaries
  - left: Saleskbach

The Ruhlander Schwarzwasser is a left-hand tributary of the Black Elster in the east German states of Brandenburg and Saxony.

== Course ==
It rises in the Bernsdorf Forest (Bernsdorfer Gemeindewald) near Heide, a village in the borough of Wiednitz (today part of Bernsdorf). As it makes its way westwards, this small river flows partly through the state of Brandenburg and partly through Saxony. In the Ruhland Heath (Ruhlander Heide) it forms the boundary between the two states. There, it is also joined from the left by the Saleskbach, which comes from the heath villages of Cosel, Grüngräbchen and Großgrabe.

The Schwarzwasser then flows northwards through Jannowitz and Arnsdorf. It discharges into the Schwarze Elster near the town of Ruhland.

In Arnsdorf, the Sieggraben dyke branches off on the left. It also enters the Black Elster, below Ruhland.

== See also ==
- List of rivers of Brandenburg
- List of rivers of Saxony
