= Dubringer Moor =

- Naturschutzgebiet Dubringer Moor
- IUCN category IV (habitat/species management area)
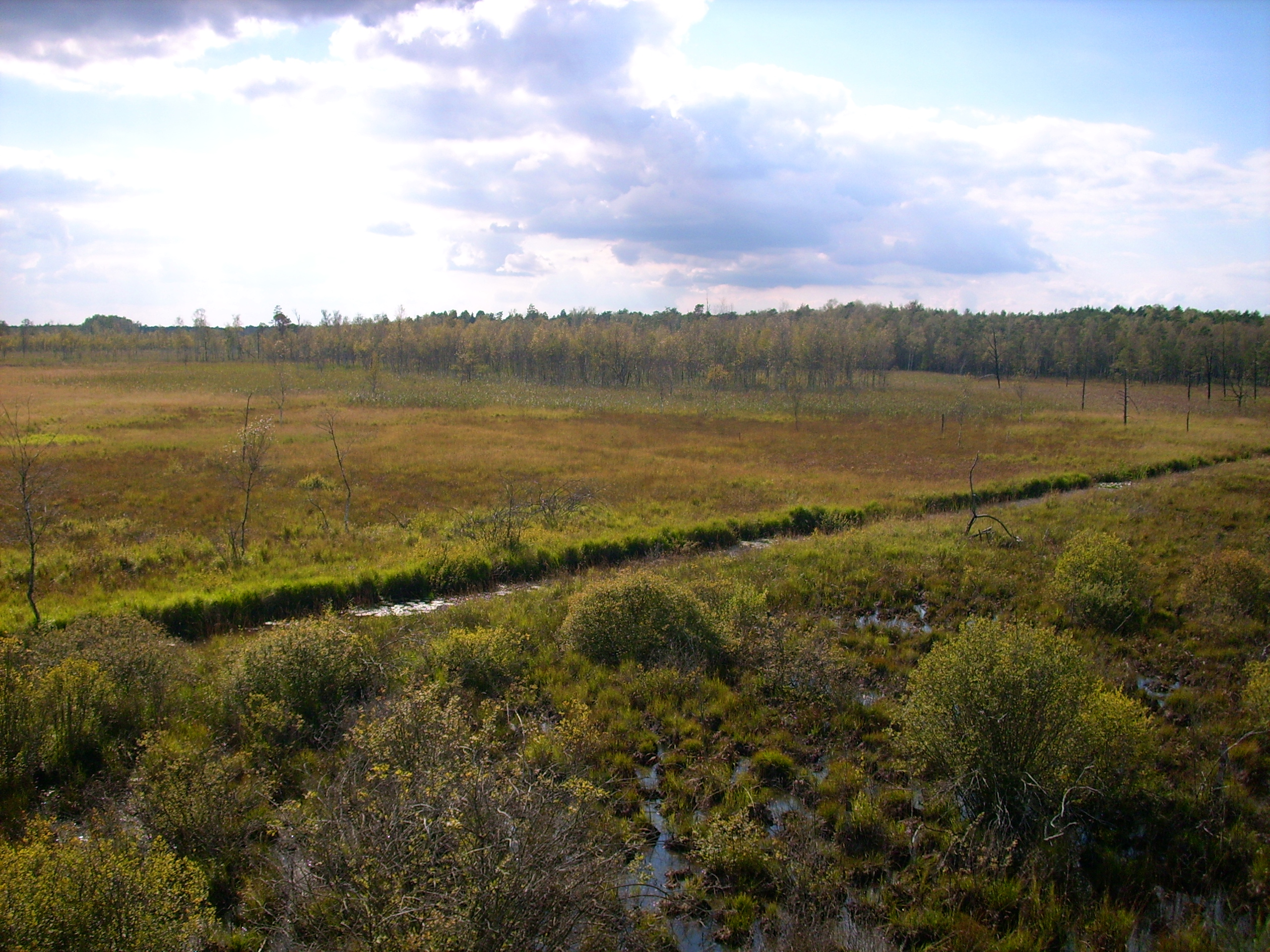
- Dubringer Moor nature reserve near Wittichenau (2012)
- Interactive map of Dubringer Moor
- Location: Bernsdorf, Hoyerswerda and Wittichenau, Saxony, Germany
- Coordinates: 51°23′48″N 14°11′51″E
- Area: 17.11 km^{2} (6.61 sq mi)
- Designation: D78
- Created: 1995-03-07

The Dubringer Moor (Upper Sorbian: Dubrjenske bahno, pronounced [ˈdubʁʲɛnskɛ ˈbahnɔ]), is a nature reserve (NSG) in the Bautzen district in northern Saxony. It lies within the three municipalities of Bernsdorf, Hoyerswerda and Wittichenau and covers an area of around 1,711 hectares. It is thus one of the largest nature reserves in Saxony.

In addition to areas of forest and grassland the nature reserve also includes several waterbodies (predominantly ponds) and bogs. The bog depression of the Dubringer Moor comprises intermediate and low-moor bogs (including an open, regenerated moorland) and is classified as a percolation bog (Durchströmungsmoor). The area is one of the largest surviving bog complexes in Upper Lusatia.

The reserve, which was first designated in 1995, bears the official index number D78. Due to its ecological significance and subsequent designation it has since become part of the Natura 2000 network of protected areas within the EU. In 2011 a slightly smaller and largely coextensive Special Area of Conservation, Dubringer Moor (EU code DE-4550-301) was created. In addition, the nature reserve, expanded by several areas of open country to the east, was designated as a bird reserve (EVG and SPA) also called Dubringer Moor (Code DE-4550-451).

== Importance for conservation ==
=== Fauna ===
Dubringer Moor is an important breeding area for threatened bird species. Those on Saxony's red list (categories 1 and 2) are.

- Hobby
- Snipe
- Kingfisher
- Grey-headed woodpecker
- Woodlark
- Lapwing
- Kleine Ralle
- Crane
- Shoveler
- Great grey shrike
- Red-backed shrike
- Bittern
- Marsh harrier
- Red kite
- Sedge warbler
- Black kite
- Black woodpecker
- White-tailed eagle
- Barred warbler
- Spotted crake
- Wryneck
- Honey buzzard
- Nightjar
