= Schwarzwasser =

Schwarzwasser is German for "black water" and may refer to:

Rivers and streams:

- Schwarzwasser (Aller), tributary of the Aller in the southeast of the Lüneburg Heath
- Schwarzwasser (Breitach) oder Schwarzwasserbach, tributary of the Breitach in Mittelberg, Vorarlberg
- Schwarzwasser (Mulde), tributary of the Zwickau Mulde in the Ore Mountains
- Schwarzwasser (Preßnitz), tributary of the Preßnitz in the Ore Mountains
- Schwarzwasser (Katzbach), tributary of the Katzbach in Poland
- Schwarzwasser (Schweidnitzer Weistritz), tributary of the Schweidnitzer Weistritz in Poland
- Schwarzwasser (Sense), tributary of the Sense in the canton of Berne
- Schwarzwasser, tributary of the Vistula in Poland, see Wda
- Hoyerswerdaer Schwarzwasser, tributary of the Black Elster in Lusatia
- Warthaer Schwarzwasser, branch of the Hoyerswerdaer Schwarzwasser between Königswartha and the Knappensee
- Schwarzwassergraben, canal diverting the Hoyerswerdaer Schwarzwasser near Groß Särchen
- Schwarzwasser, another name for the Black Pockau, Ore Mountains
- Ruhlander Schwarzwasser, tributary of the Black Elster near Ruhland in Lusatia
- Černý potok (Vidnavka), tributary of the Vidnavka in Czech Republic

Places:

- Schwarzwasser bei Neustadt (Dosse), village in the county of Ostprignitz-Ruppin
- German name for the town of Strumień on the Vistula in Těšín Silesia
- German name of the town of Czarna Woda, Voivodshop of Pomerania
- German name for the village of Černá Voda (Orlické Záhoří) in Czech Republic
- former (no longer used) German name for the village of Neirivue in the canton of Freiburg, Switzerland
- German name for the municipality of Černá Voda in Czech Silesia
- German name of the village of Černá Voda (Žacléř) of the municipality of Žacléř in Czech Republic
- German name of the village of Săcel in the Sibiu County (Hermannstadt), Romania
- German name of the municipality of Čierna Voda in Slovakia
- German name of the municipality of Čierny Balog in Slovakia

In German the term Schwarzwasser may also refer to a blackwater river or blackwater (waste).

== See also ==
- Schwarzwassertal (disambiguation)
