= Autobahnkirche Siegerland =

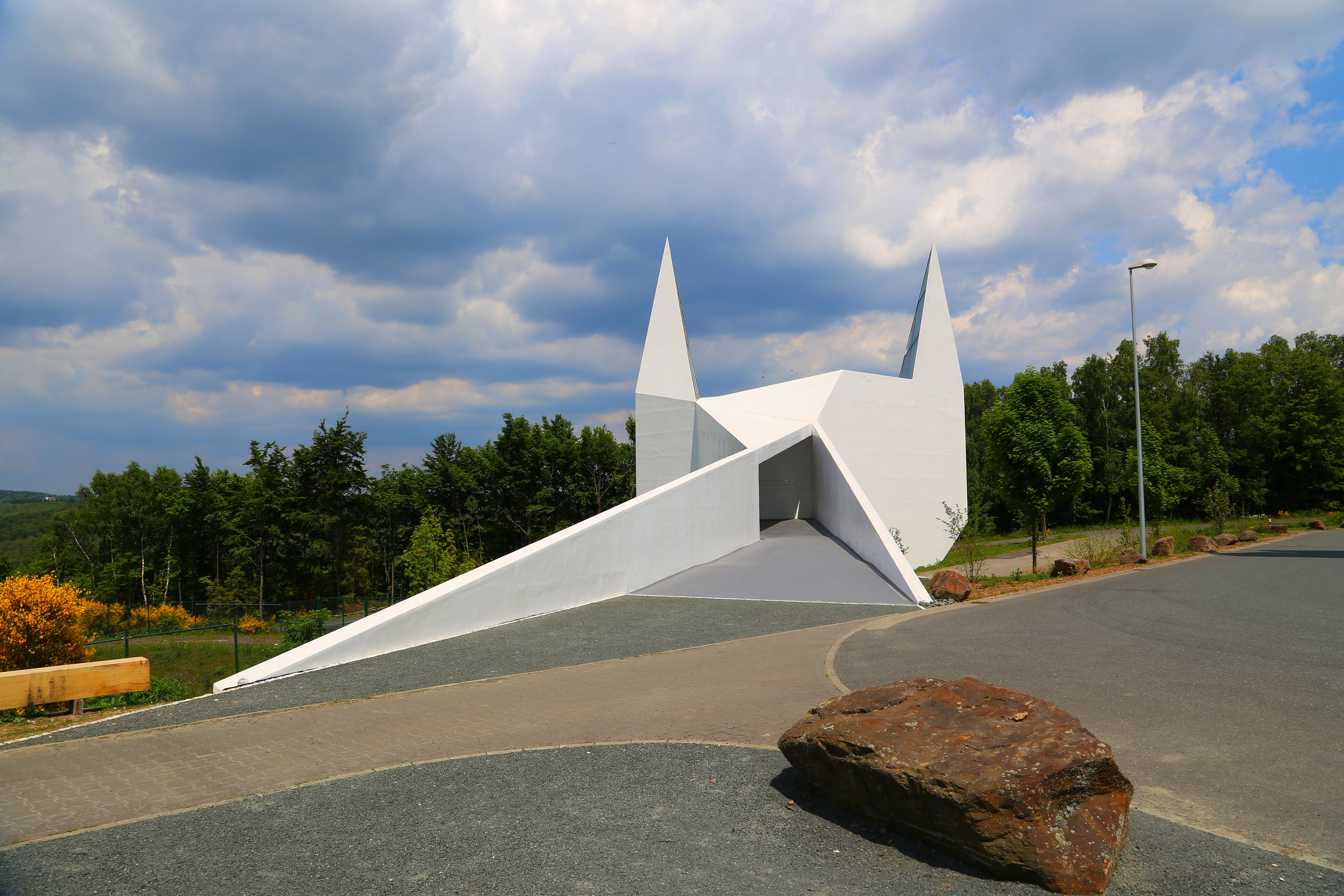
- Exterior
- Autobahnkirche Siegerland
- 50.8176°N 8.0869°E
- Location: Wilnsdorf, North Rhine-Westphalia, Germany
- Denomination: Ecumenic
- Website: www.autobahnkirche-siegerland.de

History
- Consecrated: 2013

Architecture
- Architect: Schneider + Schumacher

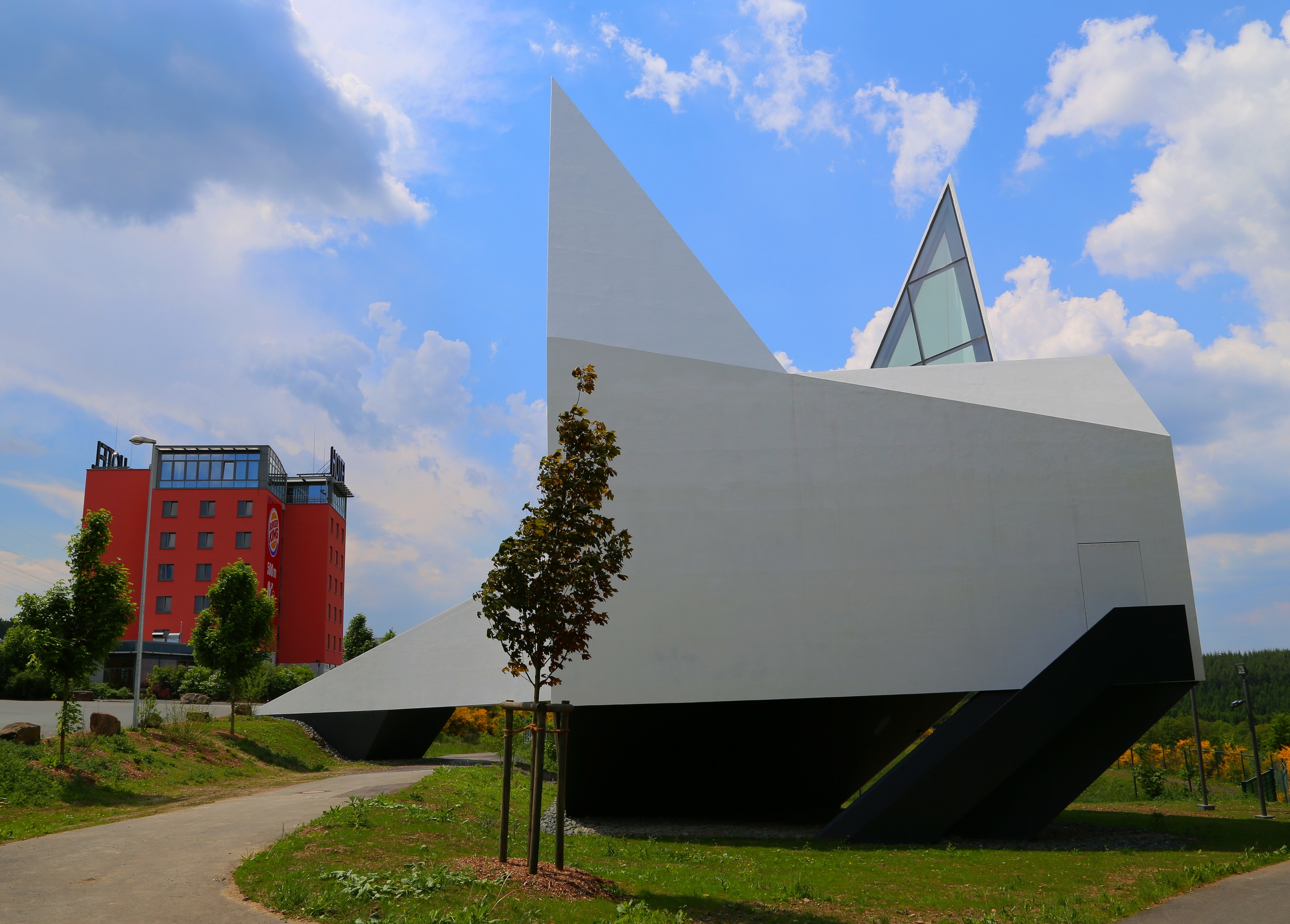
Exterior, back

Autobahnkirche Siegerland or Autobahnkirche an der A 45 is an ecumenical Christian road church at the Bundesautobahn 45 near Wilnsdorf, North Rhine-Westphalia, Germany. Opened in 2013, the building has received several architecture awards.

== History ==
The church is one of several German road churches which was initiated by private patrons and was financed primarily by donations. The building was erected following a design by Schneider + Schumacher from Frankfurt which won a 2009 competition. It was inaugurated on 26 May 2013 and received several architecture awards.

The church is dedicated to quiet contemplation by Christians of all denominations and is always open. It is run by the Förderverein Autobahnkirche Siegerland association. The association organises a Wochenschluss-Andacht on Fridays and occasional cultural events with religious themes, such as sacred music.

== Architecture ==
The exterior is based on simple geometric elements such as triangles, mostly in white. The silhouette alludes to the pictogram for the German road churches. It resembles a piece of folded paper, with an allusion to two towers. The entrance area features a typographic installation by Peter Zizka, quoting from Psalm 91:11 (Er hat seinen Engeln befohlen dich zu behüten auf allen deinen Wegen - For he shall give his angels charge over thee, to keep thee in all thy ways).

The interior, dominated by wood, contrasts with the abstract exterior. An "organic" wooden structure is reminiscent of a tent. A wooden free-standing structure is focused on the altar, enhanced by indirect lighting.

== Awards ==
The building was awarded several architecture prizes, including:

- Iconic Awards 2013
- DAM Preis für Architektur in Deutschland 2013
- AIT Award 2014
- Publikumspreis A + Award: "spektakulärstes religiöses Gebäude 2014"
