= Road church =

Network of churches in northern Europe

A German traffic sign for a road church

A road church is a roadside church, one of a network of such churches in Denmark (Danish: vejkirke), Germany (German: Autobahnkirche, open all year), Estonia (Estonian: Teeliste kirikud), Finland (Finnish: tiekirkko, Swedish: vägkyrka), Norway (Norwegian: veikirke), Russia (Murmansk oblast) and Sweden (Swedish: vägkyrka). The churches are kept open for tourists during the summer holiday season.

== Czech Republic ==
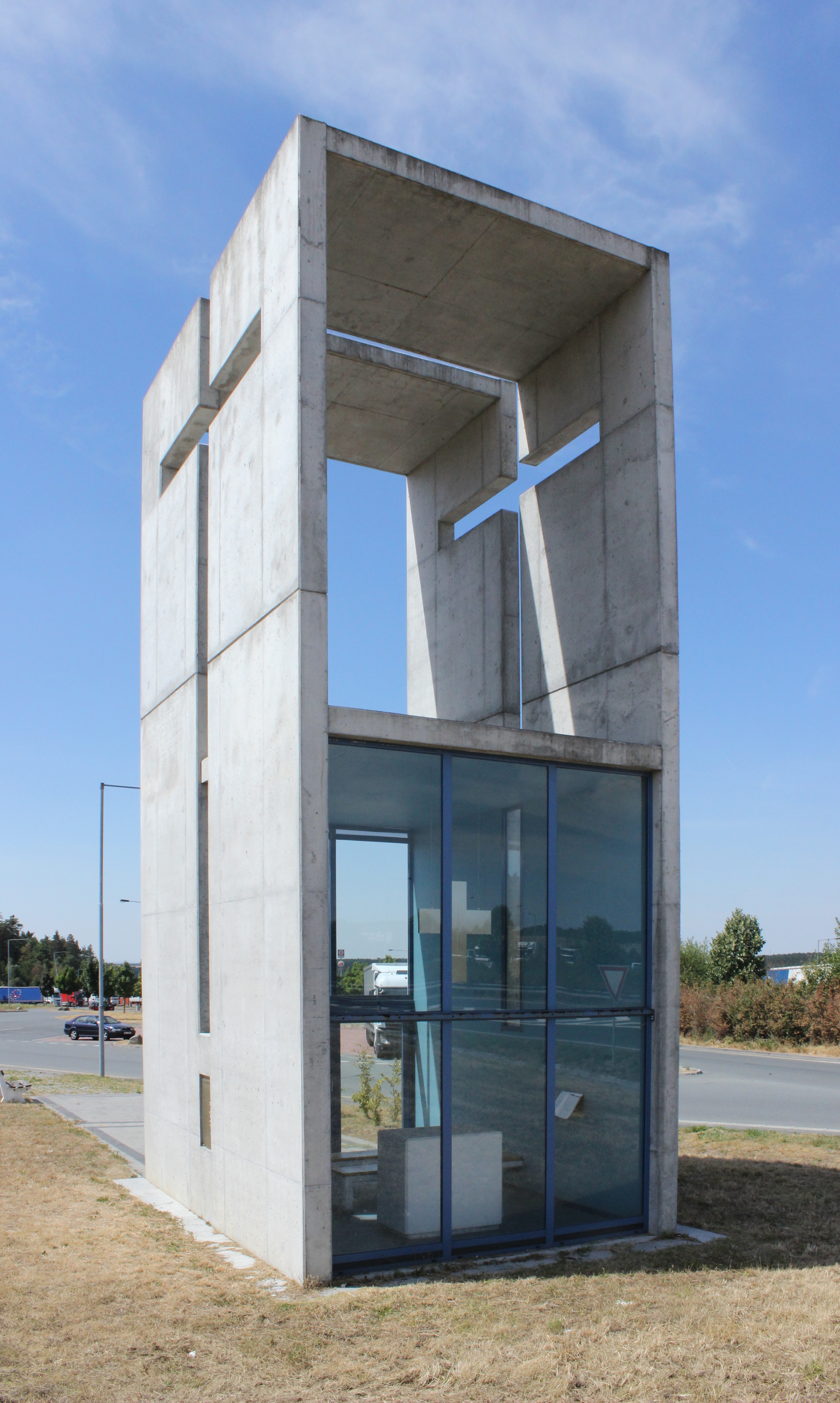
Chapel of Reconciliation near Plzeň in the Czech Republic

The only road church in the Czech Republic is the Chapel of Reconciliation (Czech: kaple Smíření), located on the D5 motorway in west Bohemia near Plzeň, built in 2008.

== Denmark ==
=== Road churches on the Danish islands ===
- 1 Tanderup Kirke
- 2 Kerte Kirke
- 3 Orte Kirke
- 4 Vissenbjerg Kirke
- 5 Særslev Kirke
- 6 Ejlby Kirke
- 7 Melby Kirke
- 8 Østrup Kirke
- 9 Gråbrødre Klosterkirke
- 10 Odense Domkirke
- 11 Vor Frue Kirke, Odense
- 12 Paarup Kirke
- 13 Sanderum Kirke
- 14 Ansgars Kirke, Odense
- 15 Dalum Kirke
- 16 Munkebjerg Kirke
- 17 Dyrup Kirke
- 18 Bellinge Kirke
- 19 Stenløse Kirke
- 20 Allerup Kirke
- 21 Sønder Nærå Kirke
- 22 Fraugde Kirke
- 23 Marslev Kirke
- 24 Birkende Kirke
- 25 Stubberup Kirke
- 26 Hesselager Kirke
- 27 Sct. Michaels Kirke, Oure
- 28 Vor Frue Kirke, Svendborg
- 29 Stenstrup Kirke
- 30 Brahetrolleborg Kirke
- 31 Fyens Rundkirke - Horne
- 32 Øster Skerninge Kirke
- 33 Skarø Kirke
- 34 Drejø Kirke
- 35 Bregninge Kirke
- 36 Odden Kirke
- 37 Lumsås Kirke
- 38 Rørvig Kirke
- 39 Nykøbing Sjælland Kirke
- 40 Egebjerg Kirke
- 41 Torup Kirke
- 42 Frederiksværk Kirke
- 43 Vinderød Kirke
- 44 Melby Kirke
- 45 Tibirke Kirke
- 46 Vejby Kirke
- 47 Blistrup Kirke
- 48 Søborg Kirke
- 49 Villingerød Kirke
- 50 Esbønderup Kirke
- 51 Helsingør Domkirke
- 52 Sthens Kirke
- 53 Asminderød Kirke
- 54 Humlebæk Kirke
- 55 Nivå Kirke
- 56 Karlebo Kirke
- 57 Egedal Kirke
- 58 Hørsholm Kirke
- 59 Gl. Holte Kirke
- 60 Holte Kirke
- 61 Birkerød Kirke
- 62 Bistrup Kirke
- 63 Lillerød Kirke
- 64 Nørre Herlev Kirke
- 65 Tjæreby Kirke
- 66 Alsønderup Kirke
- 67 Lille Lyngby Kirke
- 68 Skævinge Kirke
- 69 Ølsted Kirke
- 70 Gørløse Kirke
- 71 Slangerup Kirke
- 72 Skoven Kirke
- 73 Draaby Kirke
- 74 Gerlev Kirke
- 75 Kirke Hyllinge Kirke
- 76 Jyllinge Kirke
- 77 Hellig Kors Kirke, Jyllinge
- 78 Stenløse Kirke
- 79 Veksø Kirke
- 80 Kirkerup Kirke
- 81 Ledøje Kirke
- 82 Smørum Kirke
- 83 Sct. Jacobs Kirke, Ballerup Kirke
- 84 Lundtofte Kirke
- 85 Lyngby Kirke
- 86 Gentofte Kirke
- 87 Christianskirken, Lyngby
- 88 Bagsværd Kirke
- 89 Hareskov Kirke
- 90 Præstebro Kirke
- 91 Herlev Kirke
- 92 Islev Kirke
- 93 Grundtvigs Kirke
- 94 Lundehus Kirke
- 95 Taksigelseskirken
- 96 Bellahøj Kirke
- 97 Grøndalskirken
- 98 Sankt Johannes Kirke, København
- 99 Sct. Lukas Kirke, Frederiksberg
- 100 Frederiksberg Kirke
- 101 Jesuskirken
- 102 Solvang Kirke
- 103 Kastrup Kirke
- 104 Adventskirken, Vanløse
- 105 Hyltebjerg Kirke
- 106 Hvidovre Kirke
- 107 Maria Magdalene Kirken - Kirken ved Hvidovre Hospital
- 108 Brøndbyvester Kirke
- 109 Nygårdskirken
- 110 Herstedøster Kirke
- 111 Herstedvester Kirke
- 112 Opstandelseskirken, Albertslund
- 113 Vejleå Kirke
- 114 Greve Kirke
- 115 Johanneskirken, Greve Strand
- 116 Fløng Kirke
- 117 Jakobskirken, Roskilde
- 118 Snoldelev Kirke
- 119 Karlslunde Kirke
- 120 Karlstrup Kirke
- 121 Solrød Strandkirke
- 122 Jersie Kirke
- 123 Kirke Skensved Kirke
- 124 Ølsemagle Kirke
- 125 Højelse Kirke
- 126 Køge Kirke, Sct. Nicolai
- 127 Ejby Kirke
- 128 Bjæverskov Kirke
- 129 Raklev Kirke
- 130 Vor Frue Kirke, Kalundborg
- 131 Værslev Kirke
- 132 Aarby Kirke
- 133 Rørby Kirke
- 134 Ubby Kirke
- 135 Gørlev Kirke
- 136 Hallenslev Kirke
- 137 Sæby kirke
- 138 Buerup Kirke
- 139 Holmstrup Kirke
- 140 Jorløse Kirke
- 141 Vallekilde Kirke
- 142 Hørve Kirke
- 143 Fårevejle Kirke
- 144 Skt. Nikolai Kirke, Holbæk
- 145 Orø Kirke
- 146 Tveje Merløse Kirke
- 147 Sdr. Asmindrup Kirke
- 148 Ågerup Kirke
- 149 Kirke Sonnerup Kirke
- 150 Rye Kirke
- 151 Undløse Kirke
- 152 Ugerløse Kirke
- 153 Allerslev Kirke
- 154 Boeslunde Kirke
- 155 Flakkebjerg Kirke
- 156 Skt. Nicolai Kirke, Skælskør
- 157 Agersø Kirke
- 158 Fuglebjerg Kirke
- 159 Gimlinge Kirke
- 160 Sct. Mikkels Kirke, Slagelse
- 161 Sønderup Kirke
- 162 Lynge Kirke
- 163 Vester Broby Kirke
- 164 Slaglille Kirke
- 165 Fjenneslev Kirke
- 166 Gyrstinge Kirke
- 167 Haraldsted Kirke
- 168 Sct. Bendts Kirke, Ringsted
- 169 Haslev Kirke
- 170 Karise Kirke
- 171 Sankt Katharina Kirke, Store Heddinge
- 172 Hylleholt Kirke
- 173 Faxe Kirke
- 174 Kongsted Kirke
- 175 Herlufsholm Kirke
- 176 Vallensved Kirke
- 177 Sct. Peders Kirke, Næstved
- 178 Sct. Mortens Kirke, Næstved
- 179 Skt. Jørgens Kirke, Næstved
- 180 Vejlø Kirke
- 181 Mogenstrup Kirke
- 182 Snesere Kirke
- 183 Jungshoved Kirke
- 184 Udby Kirke
- 185 Kastrup Kirke
- 186 Vor Frue Kirke, Vordingborg
- 187 Peterskirken, Stensved
- 188 Kalvehave Kirke
- 189 Borre Kirke
- 190 Magleby Kirke
- 191 Bogø Kirke
- 192 Stubbekøbing Kirke
- 193 Maglebrænde Kirke
- 194 Horbelev Kirke
- 195 Eskilstrup Kirke
- 196 Ønslev Kirke
- 197 Majbølle Kirke
- 198 Tingsted Kirke
- 199 Idestrup Kirke
- 200 Klosterkirken, Nykøbing Falster
- 201 Toreby Kirke
- 202 Kettinge Kirke
- 203 Hunseby Kirke
- 204 Tirsted Kirke
- 205 Vesterborg Kirke
- 206 Sankt Nikolai Kirke, Nakskov
- 207 Langø Kirke

=== Road churches in Jutland ===
1. Skagen Kirke
2. Hulsig Kirke
3. Hirtshals Kirke
4. Emmersbæk Kirke
5. Sct. Hans Kirke, Hjørring
6. Vrejlev Kirke
7. Vrå Kirke
8. Sct. Thøgers Kirke, Vrensted
9. Hune Kirke
10. Rødhus Kirke
11. Jetsmark Kirke
12. Ajstrup Kirke
13. Voer Kirke
14. Dronninglund Kirke
15. Sct. Johannes Kirke, Asaa
- 16 Melholt Kirke
- 17 Kollerup Kirke
- 18 Lerup Kirke
- 19 Torslev Kirke
- 20 Gjøl Kirke
- 21 Vadum Kirke
- 22 Vodskov Kirke
- 23 Nørresundby Kirke
- 24 Ansgars Kirken, Aalborg
- 25 Vor Frue Kirke, Aalborg
- 26 Hasseris Kirke
- 27 Budolfi Kirke, Aalborg
- 28 Nørre Tranders Kirke
- 29 Sønder Tranders Kirke
- 30 Gug Kirke
- 31 Frejlev Kirke
- 32 Sønderholm Kirke
- 33 Volsted Kirke
- 34 Øster Hurup Kirke
- 35 Als Kirke
- 36 Odby Kirke
- 37 Grurup Kirke
- 38 Stagstrup Kirke
- 39 Skinnerup Kirke
- 40 Thisted Kirke
- 41 Sdr. Dråby Kirke
- 42 Skt. Clemens Kirke, Nykøbing Mors
- 43 Ljørslev Kirke
- 44 Vester Assels Kirke
- 45 Roslev Kirke
- 46 Selde Kirke
- 47 Aars Kirke
- 48 Sønderup Kirke
- 49 Testrup Kirke
- 50 Østerbølle Kirke
- 51 Thyborøn Kirke
- 52 Harboøre Kirke
- 53 Nørlem Kirke
- 54 Heldum Kirke
- 55 Dybe Kirke
- 56 Lomborg Kirke
- 57 Rom Kirke
- 58 Humlum Kirke
- 59 Struer Kirke
- 60 Handbjerg Kirke
- 61 Råsted Kirke
- 62 Idom Kirke
- 63 Holstebro Kirke
- 64 Borbjerg Kirke
- 65 Hogager Kirke
- 66 Feldborg Kirke
- 67 Haderup Kirke
- 68 Sdr. Resen Kirke
- 69 Vroue Kirke
- 70 Kobberup Kirke
- 71 Vor Frue Kirke, Skive
- 72 Dølby Kirke
- 73 Tårup Kirke
- 74 Kvols Kirke
- 75 Fiskbæk Kirke
- 76 Vorde Kirke
- 77 Romlund Kirke
- 78 Viborg Domkirke
- 79 Vestervang Kirke, Viborg
- 80 Søndermarkskirken, Viborg
- 81 Pederstrup Kirke
- 82 Hersom Kirke
- 83 Hobro Kirke
- 84 Skjellerup Kirke
- 85 V. Tørslev Kirke
- 86 Glenstrup Kirke
- 87 Råsted Kirke
- 88 Sct. Peders Kirke, Randers
- 89 Sct. Mortens Kirke, Randers
- 90 Grensten Kirke
- 91 Houlbjerg Kirke
- 92 Ørsted Kirke
- 93 Øster Alling Kirke
- 94 Pindstrup Kirke
- 95 Marie Magdalene Kirke
- 96 Koed Kirke
- 97 Stenvad Kirke
- 98 Glesborg Kirke
- 99 Grenaa Kirke - Sankt Gertruds
- 100 Lyngby Kirke
- 101 Trustrup Kirke
- 102 Nr. Vium Kirke
- 103 Herborg Kirke
- 104 Videbæk Kirke
- 105 Timring Kirke
- 106 Vildbjerg Kirke
- 107 Sinding Kirke
- 108 Ørre Kirke
- 109 Ilskov Kirke
- 110 Sunds Kirke
- 111 Gullestrup Kirke
- 112 Tjørring Kirke
- 113 Baunekirken, Tjørring
- 114 Snejbjerg Kirke
- 115 Gjellerup Kirke
- 116 Fonnesbæk Kirke, Ikast
- 117 Frederiks Kirke
- 118 Vium Kirke
- 119 Vinderslev Kirke
- 120 Hammel Kirke
- 121 Galten Kirke
- 122 Dallerup Kirke
- 123 Silkeborg Kirke
- 124 Mariehøj Kirke, Silkeborg
- 125 Veng Kirke
- 126 Mesing Kirke
- 127 Stjær Kirke
- 128 Storring Kirke
- 129 Skovby Kirke
- 130 Skivholme Kirke
- 131 Framlev Kirke
- 132 Lyngby Kirke
- 133 Hasle Kirke, Aarhus
- 134 Helligåndskirken, Aarhus
- 135 Elsted Kirke
- 136 Risskov Kirke
- 137 Skt. Johannes Kirke, Aarhus
- 138 Aarhus Domkirke
- 139 Sankt Lukas Kirke, Aarhus
- 140 Åbyhøj Kirke
- 141 Brabrand Kirke
- 142 Adslev Kirke
- 143 Hørning Kirke
- 144 Mårslet Kirke
- 145 Beder Kirke
- 146 Malling Kirke
- 147 Skanderup Kirke
- 148 Skanderborg Slotskirke
- 149 Hylke Kirke
- 150 Østbirk Kirke
- 151 Ørridslev Kirke
- 152 Hansted Kirke
- 153 Vor Frelsers Kirke, Horsens
- 154 Horsens Klosterkirke
- 155 Torsted Kirke
- 156 Østerhåb Kirke
- 157 Øster Nykirke
- 158 Nørre Snede Kirke
- 159 Vester Kirke, Thyregod
- 160 Sønder Omme Kirke
- 161 Tarm Kirke
- 162 Rindum Kirke
- 163 Ølgod Kirke
- 164 Henne Kirke
- 165 Aal Kirke
- 166 Grindsted Kirke
- 167 Jelling Kirke
- 168 Hedensted Kirke
- 169 Vrigsted Kirke
- 170 Engum Kirke
- 171 Bredballe Kirke
- 172 Nørremarkskirken, Vejle
- 173 Sct. Nicolai Kirke, Vejle
- 174 Gårslev Kirke
- 175 Egeskov Kirke
- 176 Skærup Kirke
- 177 Smidstrup Kirke
- 178 Christianskirken, Fredericia
- 179 Sct. Michaelis Kirke, Fredericia
- 180 Lyng Kirke, Erritsø
- 181 Taulov Kirke
- 182 Simon Peters Kirke, Kolding
- 183 Sankt Nicolai Kirke, Kolding
- 184 Sdr. Bjert Kirke
- 185 Sædden Kirke
- 186 Zions Kirke, Esbjerg
- 187 Malt Kirke
- 188 Askov Kirke
- 189 Vejen Kirke
- 190 Læborg Kirke
- 191 Bække Kirke
- 192 Sankt Nikolai Kirke, Farup
- 193 Jels Kirke
- 194 Tyrstrup Kirke
- 195 Haderslev Domkirke
- 196 Vedsted Kirke
- 197 Løgumkloster Kirke
- 198 Tønder Kristkirke
- 199 Rise Kirke
- 200 Løjt Kirke
- 201 Varnæs Kirke
- 202 Kliplev Kirke
- 203 Broager Kirke
- 204 Dybbøl Kirke
- 205 Sct. Marie Kirke, Sønderborg
- 206 Christianskirken, Sønderborg
- 207 Lysabild Kirke
- 208 Oksbøl Kirke

== Estonia ==
List of road churches in Estonia

== Finland ==
The first road churches (Finnish: tiekirkko, Swedish: vägkyrka) were opened in Finland during the 1990s. There are about 265 churches that act as roadside churches in the summer time. Most of the churches are Lutheran and some are Finnish Orthodox.

== Germany ==
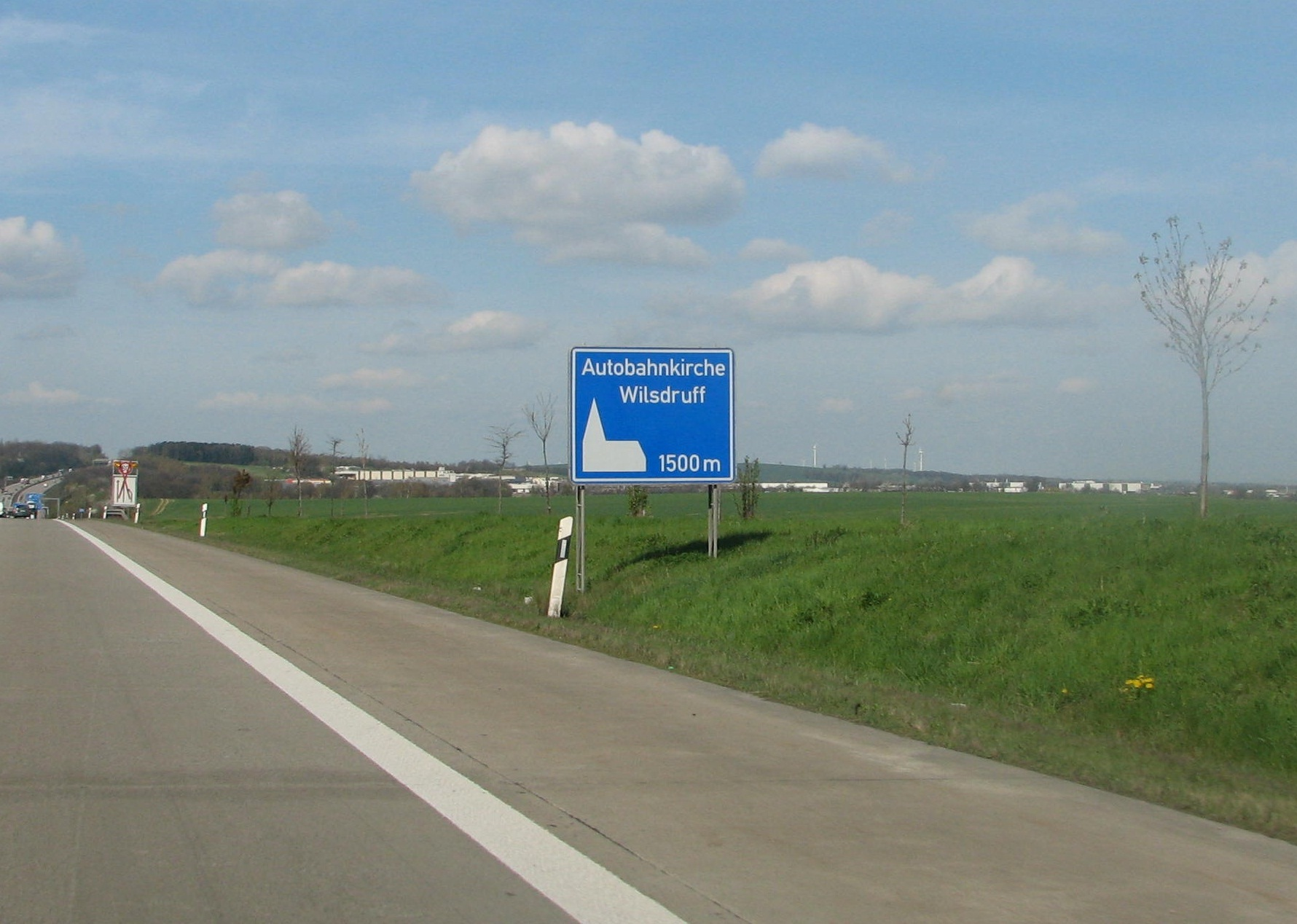
A German traffic sign for a road church

The first road church was opened in Germany in 1958. In 2012 there are 39 road churches or chapels. Some of them were built on purpose in a rest area, others are old village churches which happen to be situated near an access point. In liturgical terms, they range from ecumenical chapels with no formal rank up to fully consecrated Roman Catholic churches. Churches are open all year.

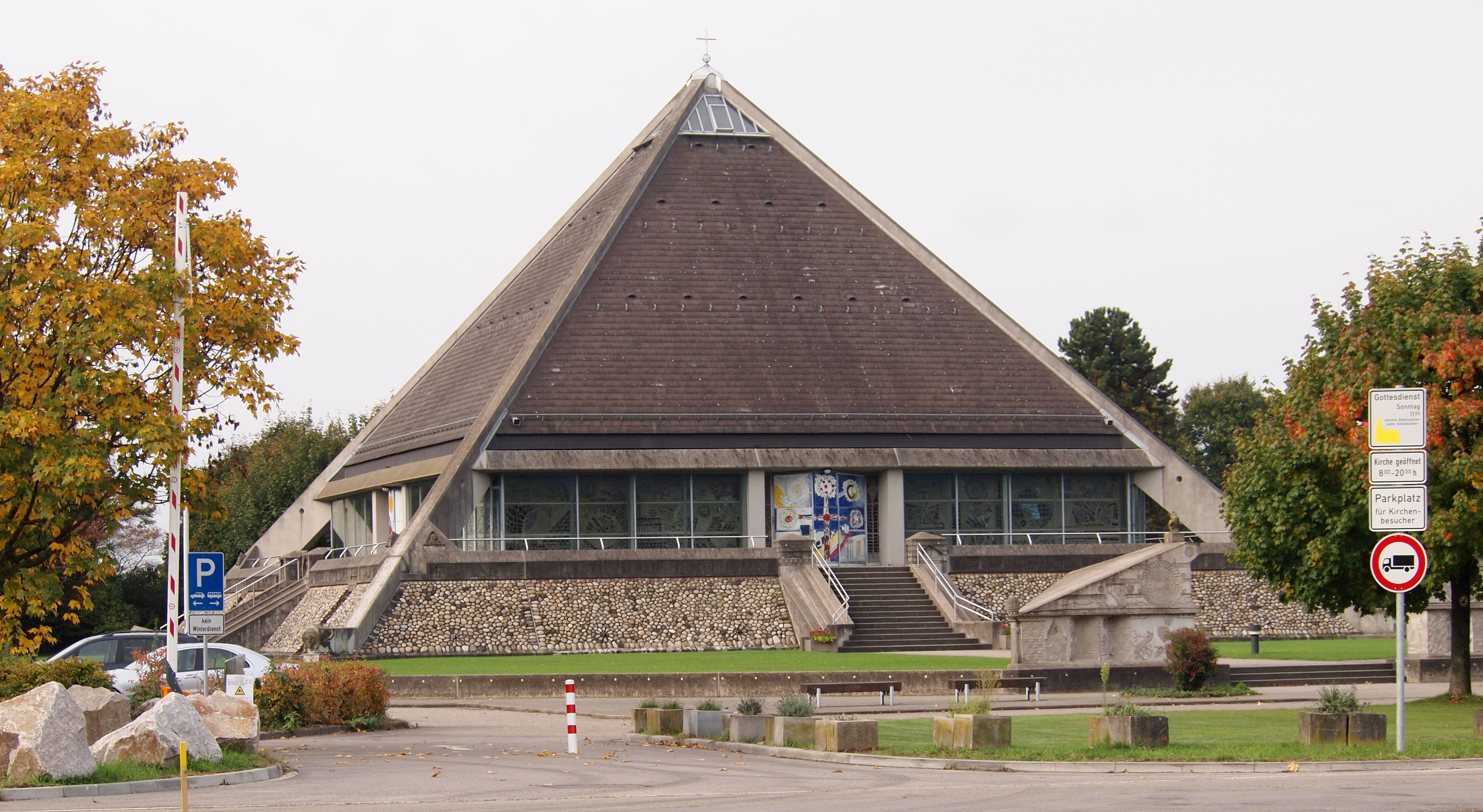
Autobahnkirche Baden-Baden

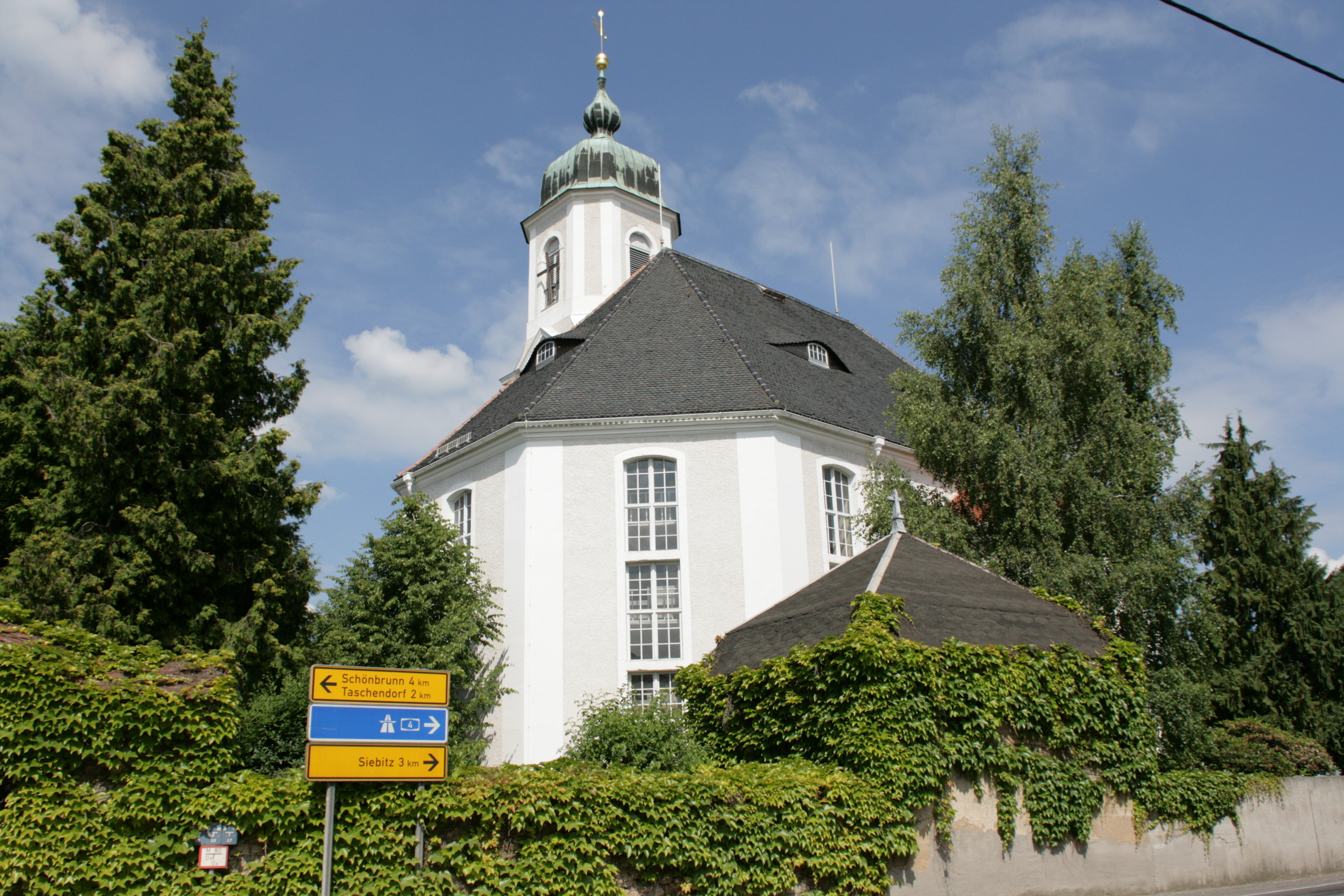
Autobahnkirche Burkau-Uhyst am Taucher

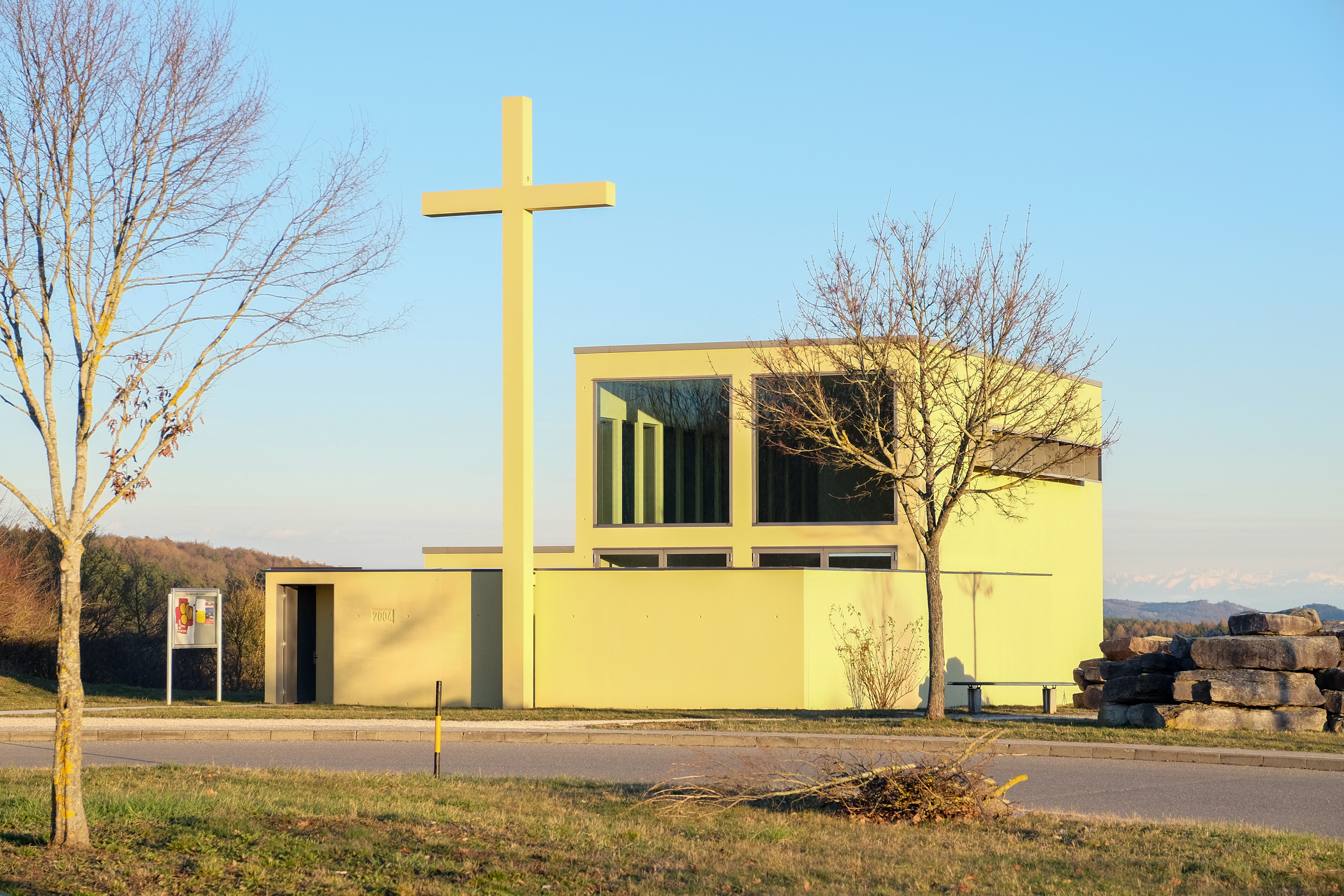
Emmauskapelle, Singen

1. Ökumenische Autobahnkapelle Dammer Berge
2. Ökumenische Autobahnkapelle Roxel
3. Evangelische Autobahn- und Gemeindekirche Exter
4. Evangelisch-lutherische Autobahn- und Gemeindekirche Peter und Paul, Uhyst am Taucher
5. Ökumenische Autobahnkapelle Geismühle
6. Katholische Autobahnkapelle St. Raphael, Nievenheim
7. Evangelische Autobahn- und Gemeindekirche Gelmeroda
8. Evangelische Autobahn- und Gemeindekirche Waldlaubersheim (Martinskirche)
9. Katholische Autobahnkirche St. Christophorus Himmelkron, Bad Berneck
10. Autobahnkirche "Maria, Schutz der Reisenden", Adelsried
11. Katholische Autobahnkirche St. Christophorus, Baden-Baden
12. Katholische Autobahn- und Pfarrkirche "Maria am Wege", Windach
13. Evangelische Autobahn- und Gemeindekirche Duben
14. Katholische Autobahnkapelle St. Antonius, Gescher/Coesfeld
15. Ökumenische Autobahnkapelle "Galluskapelle", Leutkirch im Allgäu
16. Evangelische Autobahnkirche Medenbach
17. Evangelische Autobahn- und Gemeindekirche Kavelstorf
18. Ökumenische Autobahnkapelle "Jesus - Brot des Lebens", Groß-Hesepe
19. Ökumenische Autobahnkapelle "Emmauskapelle", Engen (near Singen)
20. Ökumenische Autobahnkirche "Licht auf unserem Weg", Geiselwind
21. Evangelische Autobahn- und Gemeindekirche Werbellin
22. SVG-Autohofkapelle Schlüchtern
23. Autobahnkirche Siegerland
24. Evangelische Autobahn- und Gemeindekirche St. Benedikt, Hohenwarsleben
25. Evangelische Autobahn-, Stadt- und Klosterkirche Brehna
26. Evangelische Autobahn- und Gemeindekirche St. Petri, Brumby
27. SVG-Autohofkapelle Hessisch Lichtenau
28. SVG-Autohofkapelle Schwabhausen
29. Ökumenische Autobahnkirche Waidhaus
30. SVG-Autohofkapelle Kirchheim/Hessen
31. Ökumenische Autobahnkirche Jakobikirche, Wilsdruff
32. Evangelische Autobahn- und Gemeindekirche St. Pancratius, Rothenschirmbach, OT der Lutherstadt Eisleben
33. Autohofkapelle an der A 44 Kassel-Dortmund, Abfahrt Diemelstadt
34. Evangelische Autobahnkirche St. Kilian
35. Autobahnkapelle Kassel "Licht auf dem Weg"
36. Autobahnkapelle Hamm
37. Autobahnkirche RUHR in Bochum
38. Autobahnkirche St. Paul, Wittlich
39. Autobahnkirche St. Thomas von Aquin, Trockau
40. Evangelische Nikolaikirche und katholische St. Marienkirche Grasdorf (Holle)

== Italy ==
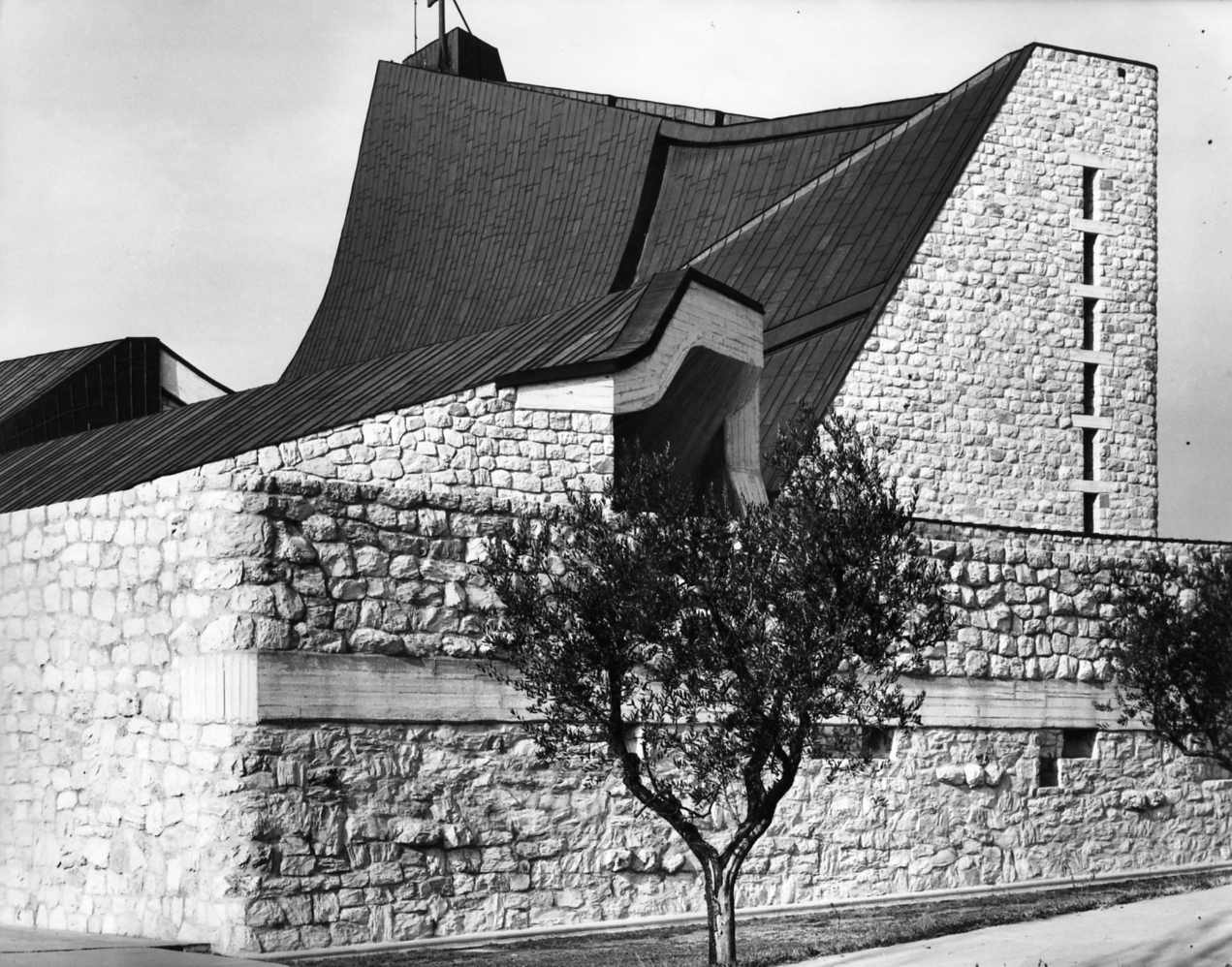
The church of San Giovanni Battista near Florence, Italy.

- San Giovanni Battista, Highway A11, called "Church of the Motorway" (1960–64), by Giovanni Michelucci

== Norway ==
List of road churches in Norway

== Russia ==
There were two road churches in Murmansk oblast open in summer 2012.

== Sweden ==
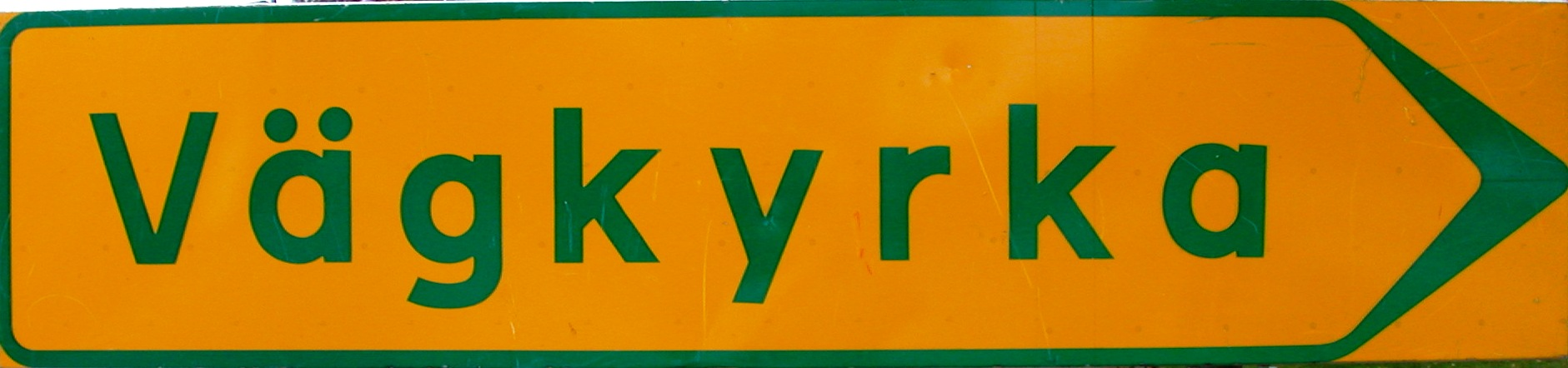
A sign for a road church in Sweden

List of road churches in Sweden
