= Klosterwasser =

River in Germany

Klosterwasser/Klóšterska woda
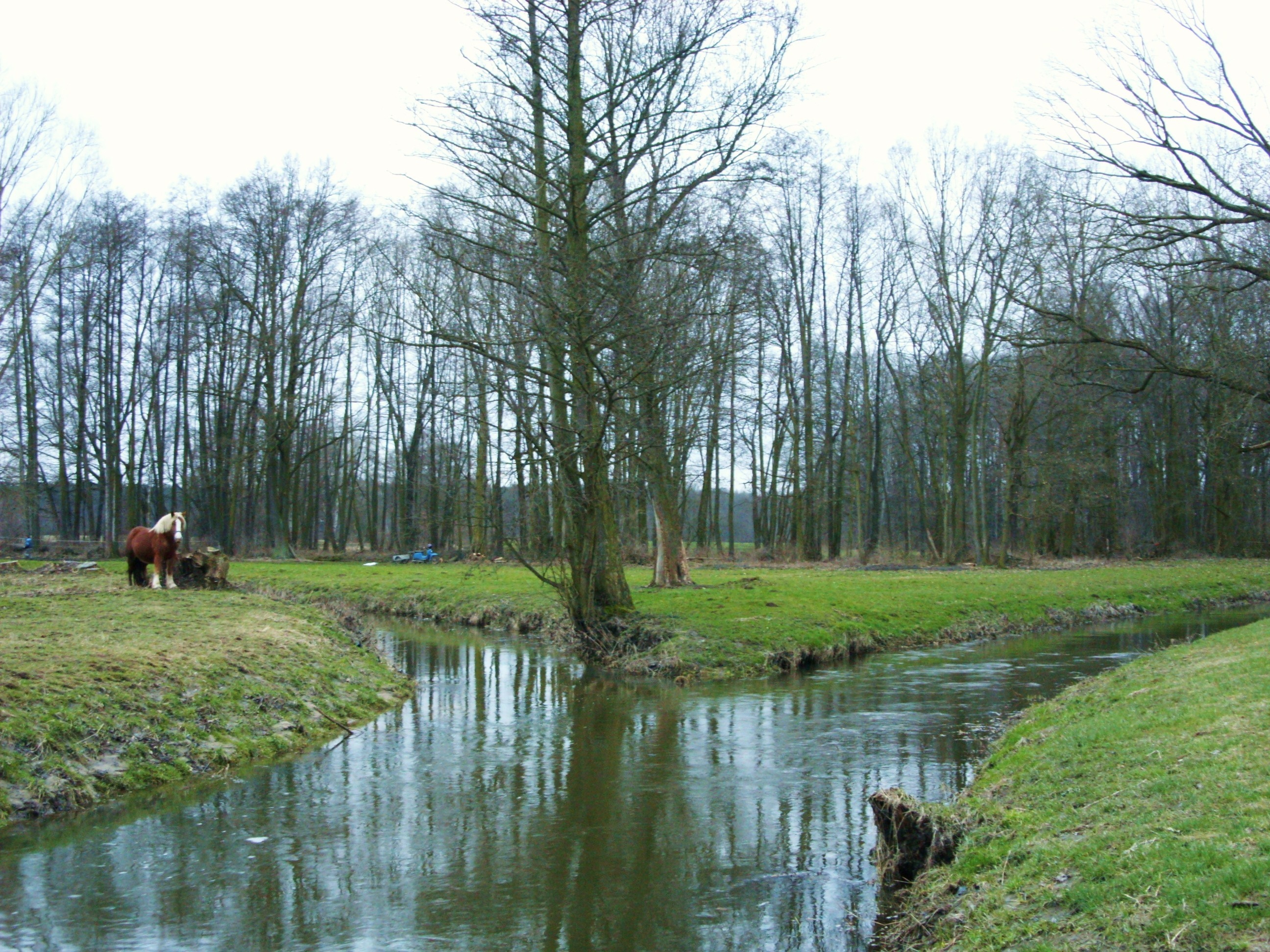
- The Klosterwasser mouth (left) in Kotten.

Location
- Country: Germany
- State: Saxony
- Region: Upper Lusatia

Physical characteristics
- Source
  - location: Upper Lusatia
- Mouth
  - location: Schwarze Elster
  - coordinates: 51.3529°N 14.2451°E
- Length: ±25 km (16 mi)
- Basin size: 107 km^{2} (41 sq mi)
- Discharge
  - average: 4.91 m^{3}/s (173 cu ft/s)

Basin features
- Progression: Black Elster→ Elbe→ North Sea

Klosterwasser (Upper Sorbian: Klóšterska woda, pronounced [ˈklʊʃtɛʁska ˈwɔda]) is a river of Saxony, Germany. It is a right tributary of the Black Elster, which it joins near Wittichenau. The source of the Klosterwasser/Klóšterska woda is located in Burkau/Porchow, Germany, in the Lusatian Highlands (Lausitzer Bergland) near the Czech border.

== See also ==
- List of rivers of Saxony
