= Schwarzwassertal =

Schwarzwassertal is German for "black water valley" and may refer to the following valleys in Central Europe:

- the valley of the Black Pockau in the Ore Mountains
- the Schwarzwassertal in Tyrol, a side valley of the Lech valley
- the Schwarzwassertal in Vorarlberg, a side valley of the Kleinwalsertal

and the valley of various rivers called the Schwarzwasser.
