= Burkau =

Burkau/Porchow
- Municipality
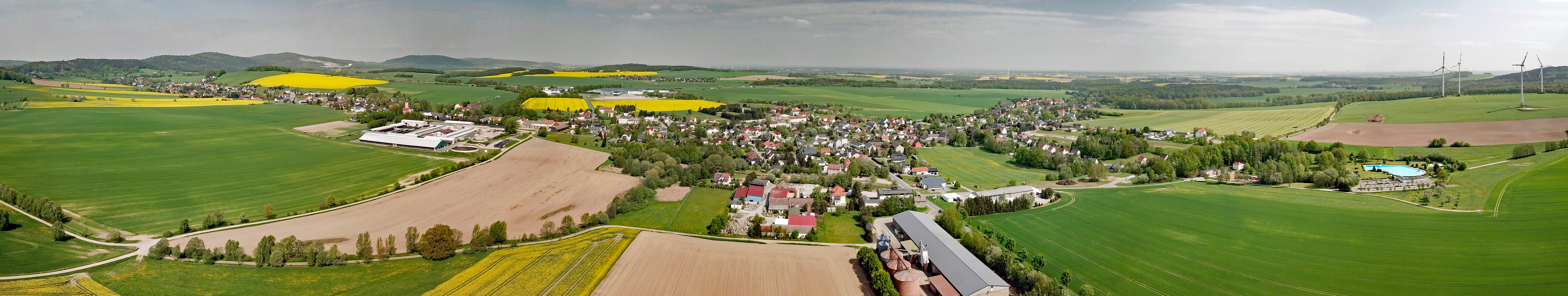
- Aerial panorama of the village

- Coat of arms

- Location of Burkau/Porchow within Bautzen district
- Interactive map of Burkau/Porchow
- Location within Germany Location within Saxony
- Coordinates: 51°11′N 14°11′E
- Country: Germany
- State: Saxony
- District: Bautzen
- Subdivisions: 9

Government
  - Mayor (2019–26): Sebastian Hein (CDU)

Area
  - Total: 31.83 km^{2} (12.29 sq mi)
- Elevation: 231 m (758 ft)

Population (2025-12-31)
  - Total: 2,540
  - Density: 79.8/km^{2} (207/sq mi)
- Time zone: UTC+01:00 (CET)
  - Summer (DST): UTC+02:00 (CEST)
- Postal codes: 01906
- Dialling codes: 035953
- Vehicle registration: BZ, BIW, HY, KM
- Website: www.gemeinde-burkau.de

Burkau (German) or Porchow (Upper Sorbian, pronounced [ˈpɔʁxɔf]) is a municipality in the east of Saxony, in the district of Bautzen in Germany.

== Geography ==
Burkau is in the northern part of the Bautzen district in a wood rich region in Upper Lusatia. It is about 6 km away – in northern direction – from the city of Bischofswerda and about 16 km – in western direction – from the main city of the district – Bautzen/Budyšin. The inner German motorway A4 between Dresden and Görlitz is near the community and has two direct connections with it. The source of the Klosterwasser/Klóšterska woda is located in the territory of Burkau/Porchow. Nearby in the hills of the western Lusatia there is the source of the Schwarze Elster – one of the most important rivers of this region.

== History ==
In 1164 the village of Burkau has been mentioned for the first time in document – other sources say it happened some hundred years later in 1312 – that is why the real age of it is still not known.

The administrative community that exists today has been formed in 1994 when three formally independent communities decided to unify – those were:

- Burkau/Porchow
- Uhyst am Taucher/Horni Wujězd
- Kleinhänchen/Mały Wosyk

Together with all their smaller communities:

- Auschkowitz/Wučkecy
- Großhänchen/Wulki Wosyk
- Jiedlitz/Jědlica
- Neuhof/Nowy Dwór
- Pannewitz/Panecy
- Taschendorf/Ledźborecy

== Sights ==
The sights of the community are an old manor in Pannewitz, the stone-mill and the "Jiedlitzer Buchholzmühle" in Bocka and the church of Uhyst of the year 1801, now a road church in classic style.
