= Wiednitz =

- Ortsteil of Bernsdorf
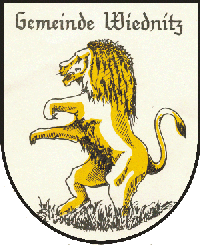
- Coat of arms
- Interactive map of Wiednitz
- Location within Germany Location within Saxony
- Coordinates: 51°24′N 14°2′E
- Country: Germany
- State: Saxony
- District: Bautzen
- Town: Bernsdorf
- Subdivisions: 2

Area
  - Total: 15.94 km^{2} (6.15 sq mi)
- Elevation: 134 m (440 ft)

Population (2010-12-31)
  - Total: 950
  - Density: 60/km^{2} (150/sq mi)
- Time zone: UTC+01:00 (CET)
  - Summer (DST): UTC+02:00 (CEST)
- Postal codes: 02994
- Dialling codes: 035723
- Vehicle registration: BZ
- Website: www.wiednitz.de

Wiednitz (Sorbian: Wětnica) is a village and former municipality in the district of Bautzen, in Saxony, Germany. With effect from 1 January 2012, it has been incorporated into the town of Bernsdorf.
