= Wittichenau =

Wittichenau/Kulow
- Town
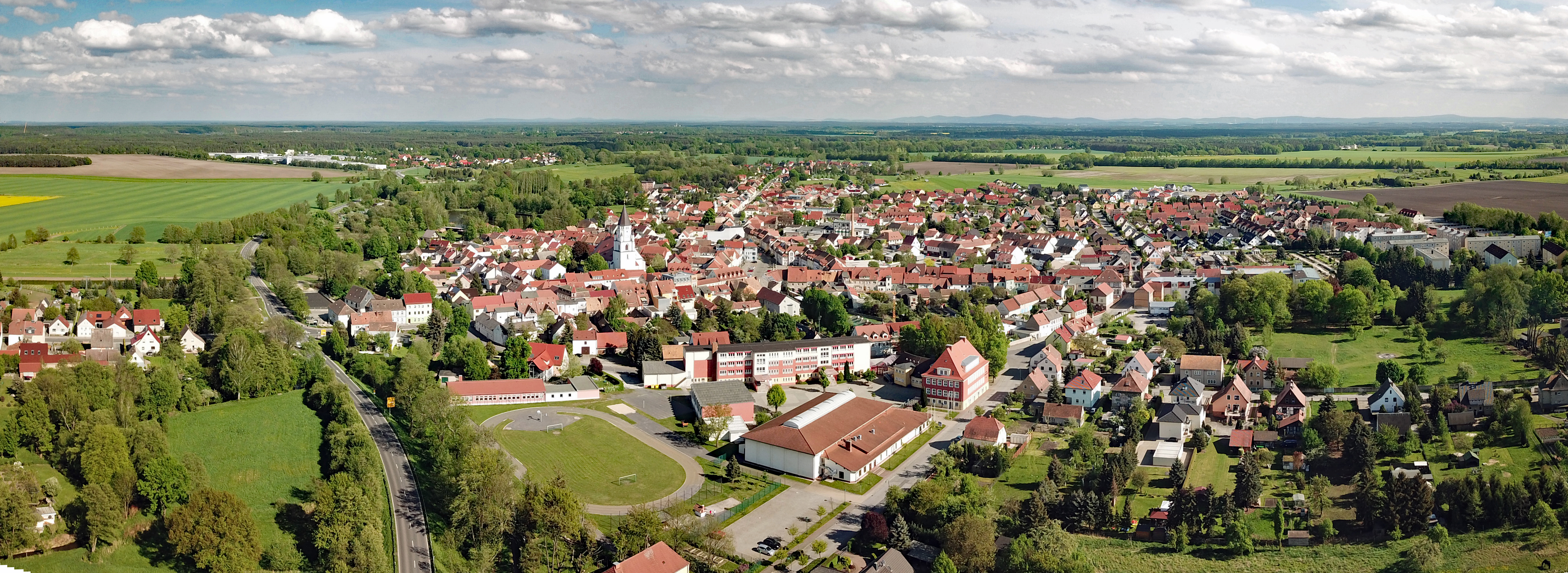
- Aerial panorama of the town

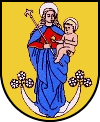
- Coat of arms

- Location of Wittichenau/Kulow within Bautzen district
- Interactive map of Wittichenau/Kulow
- Location within Germany Location within Saxony
- Coordinates: 51°23′N 14°15′E
- Country: Germany
- State: Saxony
- District: Bautzen
- Subdivisions: 12

Government
  - Mayor (2021–28): Markus Posch (CDU)

Area
  - Total: 61.02 km^{2} (23.56 sq mi)
- Elevation: 127 m (417 ft)

Population (2025-12-31)
  - Total: 5,505
  - Density: 90.22/km^{2} (233.7/sq mi)
- Demonym(s): German: Wittichenauer; Upper Sorbian: Kulowčan (m.), Kulowčanka (f.)
- Time zone: UTC+01:00 (CET)
  - Summer (DST): UTC+02:00 (CEST)
- Postal codes: 02997
- Dialling codes: 035725
- Vehicle registration: BZ, BIW, HY, KM
- Website: www.wittichenau.de/stadt

Wittichenau (German, pronounced [vɪtɪçəˈnaʊ]) or Kulow (Upper Sorbian, pronounced [ˈkulɔf]) is a bilingual town in the district of Bautzen in the Free State of Saxony, Germany. It is situated on the river Schwarze Elster, 6 km south of Hoyerswerda.

This small municipality is situated in the heart of bilingual Lusatia region which was for long centuries part of the Bohemian Crown and was passed to Saxony in 1635. Wittichenau has 6,300 inhabitants of whom the Sorbian-speaking, Slavic Lusatian population compose about 35-40%; the other 60-65% speak German. It is part of the recognized Sorbian settlement area in Saxony.

== Geography ==
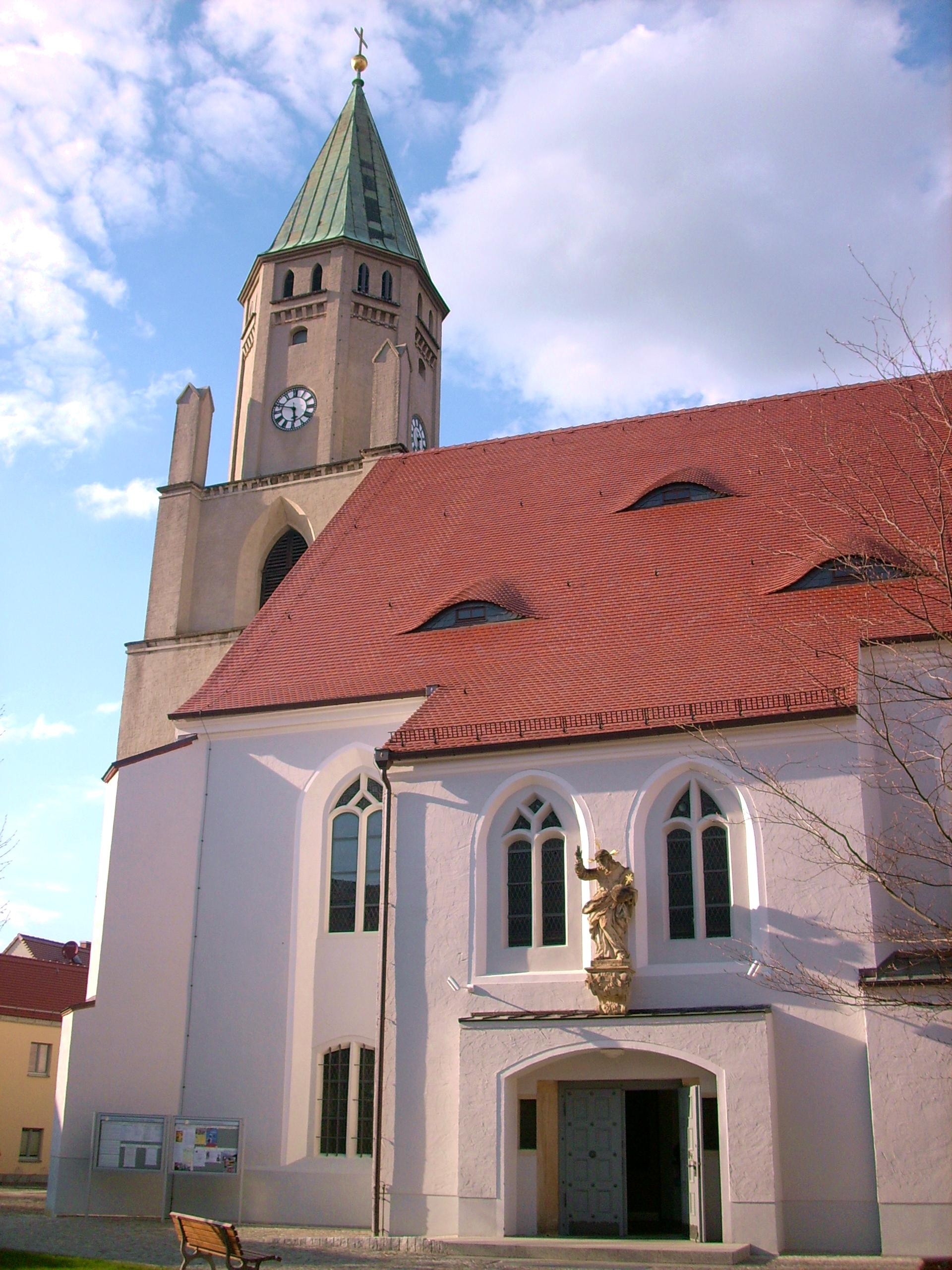
Pfarrkirche Wittichenau

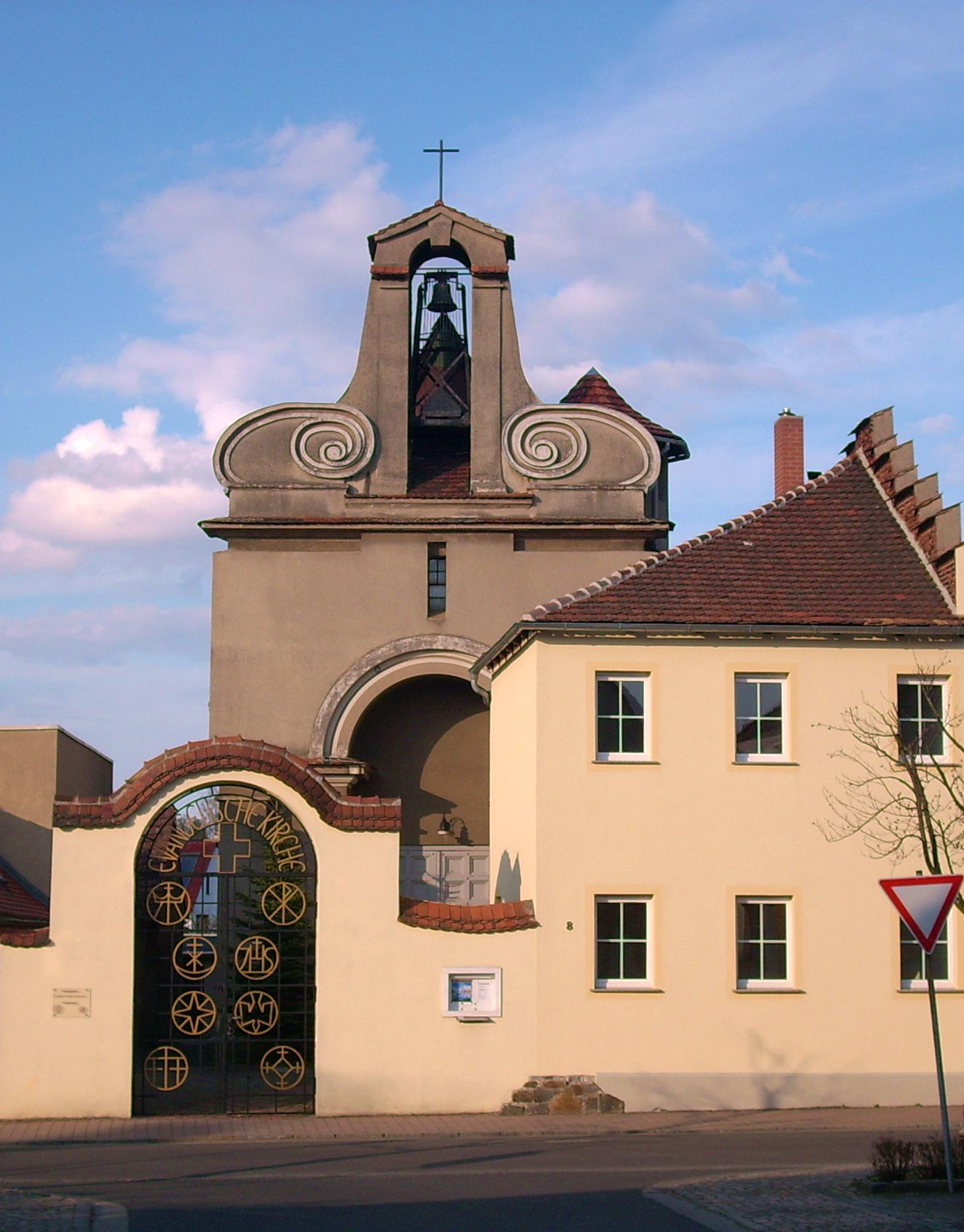
Protestant church in Wittichenau

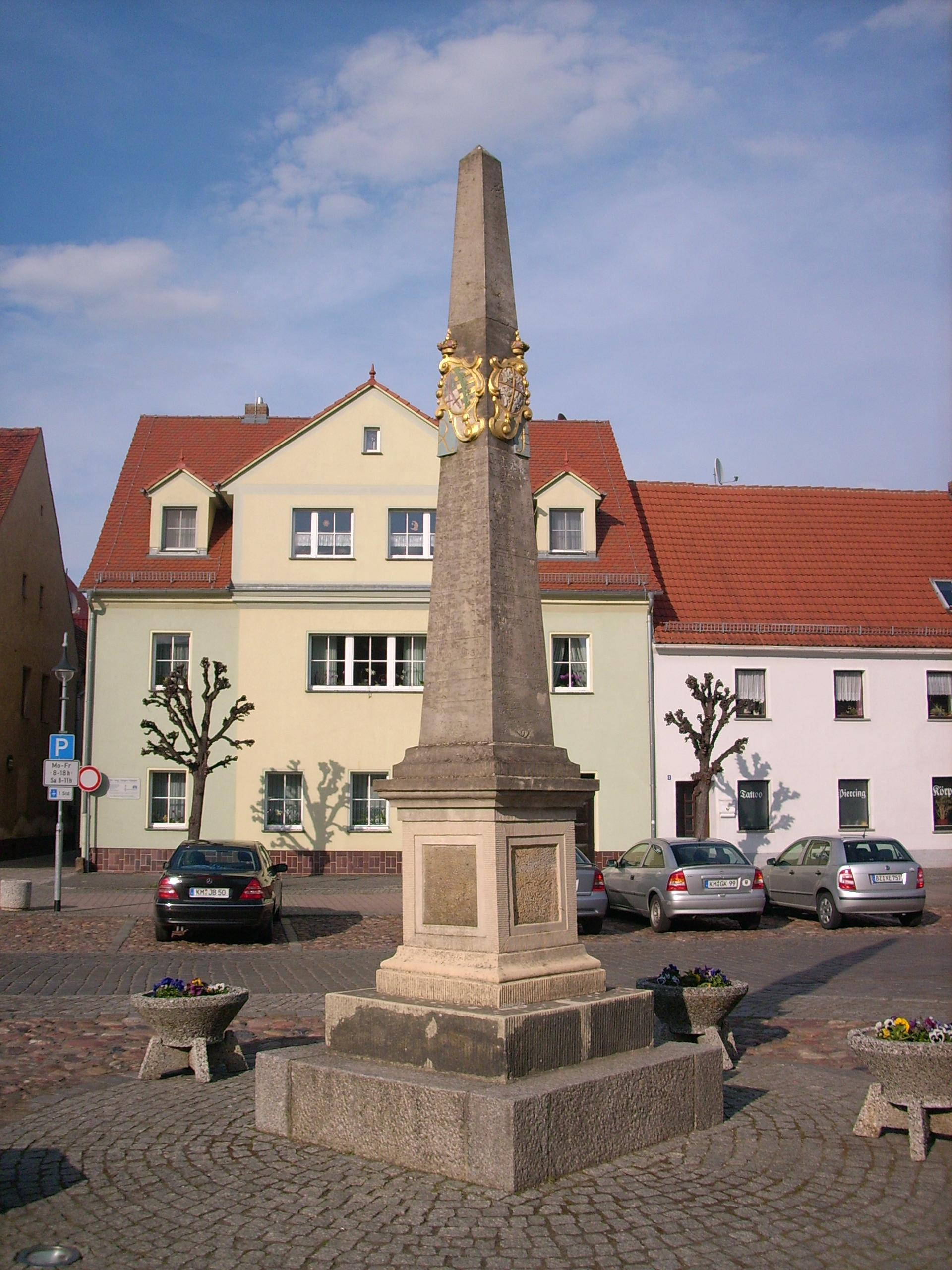
Saxon post milestone

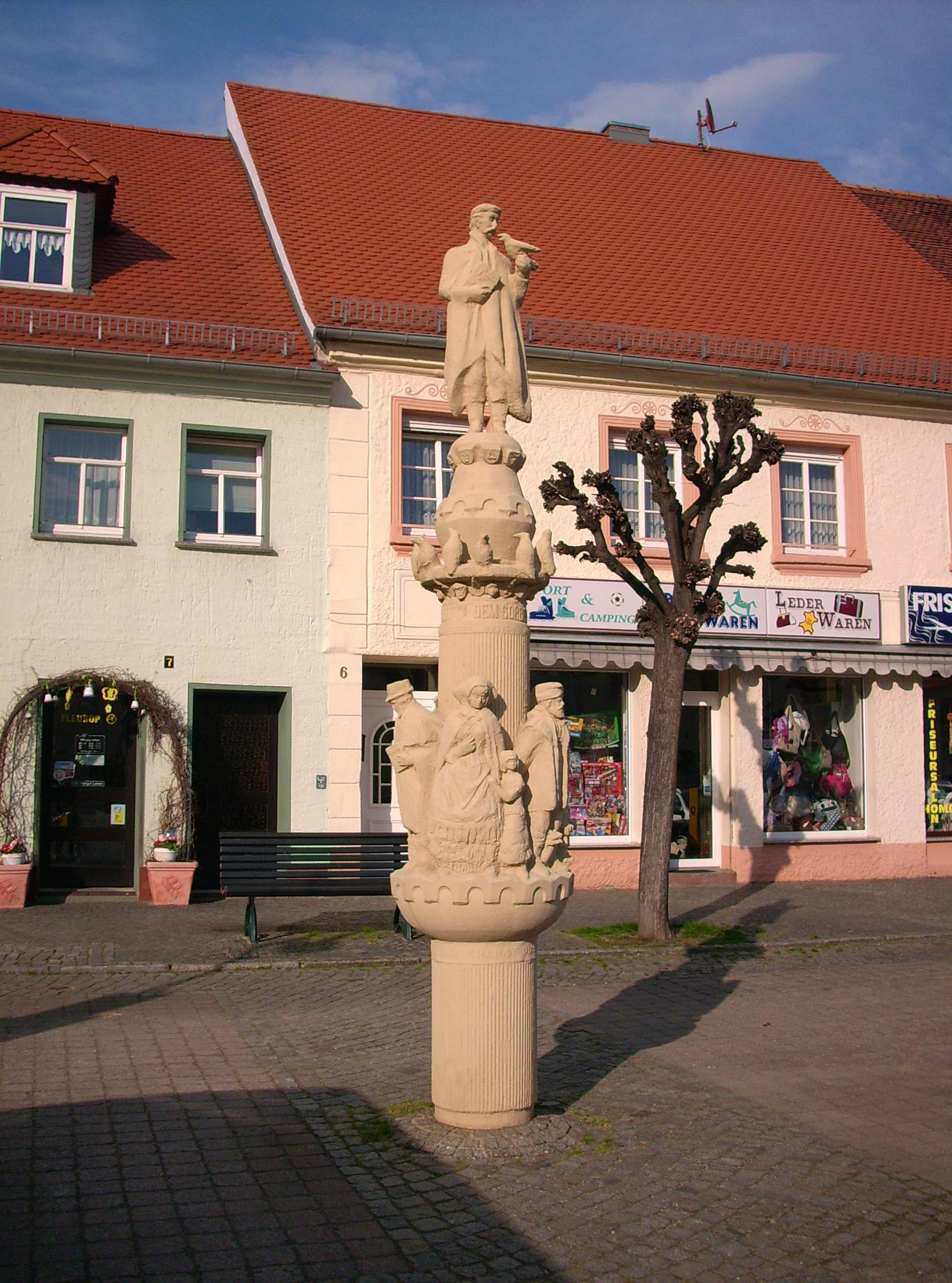
Column for the title character of Krabat

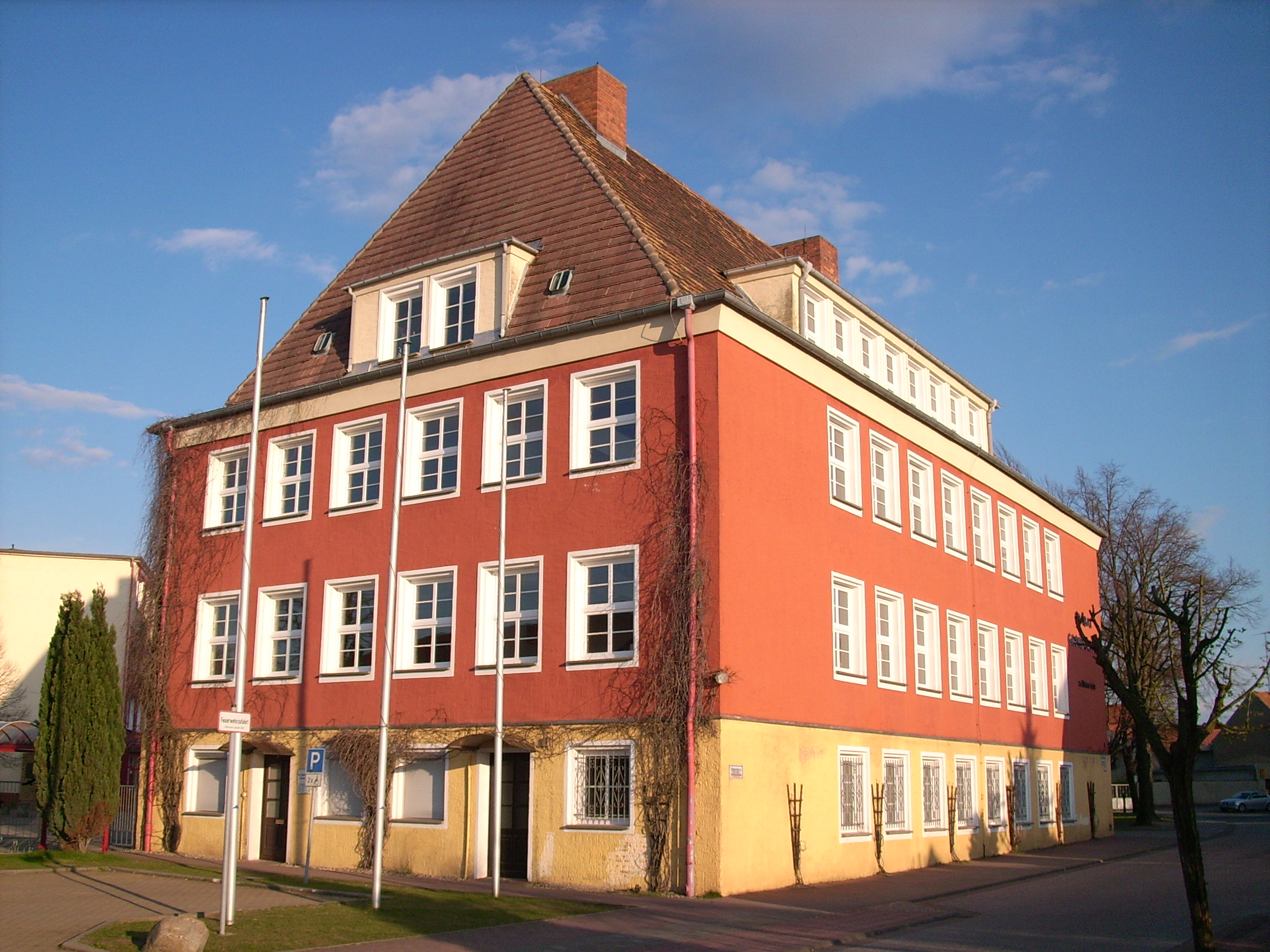
School in Wittichenau

== Notable people ==
- Georg August Swotlick (1650-1729), translated the Bible into Sorbian and created the first printed Sorbian dictionary.
- Mathias Wenzel Jäckel (1655-1738), was a prominent baroque sculptor, works can be seen in the Wittichenau Pfarrkirche and on the Karlsbrücke in Prague.
- Xaver Jakub Ticin (1656-1693), wrote the first Upper Sorbian grammar, died near Belgrade as a chaplain in the Turkish War.
- Franz Georg Lock (1751-1831), bishop.
- Herta Nikovich (1923-1994) left 102,000 dollars as a founder of the "Wittichenau children" - Mrs. Nikovich Foundation for the promotion of education, education, youth welfare and youth welfare for all children of the city of Wittichenau.
- Günter Särchen (1927-2004), Catholic social pedagogue, publicist and pioneer of German-Polish reconciliation, honorary citizen of Wittichenau.
- Hubertus Zomack (born 1941), Catholic theologian and priest, was Vicar General of the Bishopric of Görlitz.
- Waltraut Skoddow (1942-2014), writer.
- Ulrich Pogoda (born 1954), Sorbian composer of classical music.
- Peter Schowtka (1945–2022), politician (CDU), deputy in the Saxonian Landtag 1991-2014 and from 1990 to 1994 mayor of Wittichenau.

== See also ==
- Dubringer Moor, a local nature reserve
