= Černý potok (Smědá) =

Stream in Czech Republic

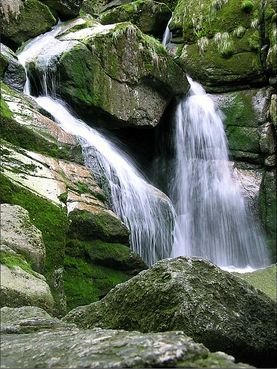

Location
- Country: Czech Republic

Physical characteristics
- Source
  - location: Jizera Mountains
- Mouth
  - location: Smědá
  - coordinates: 50.8739°N 15.2003°E

Basin features
- Progression: Smědá→ Lusatian Neisse→ Oder→ Baltic Sea

The Černý potok is a tributary on the left side of the river Smědá in Liberec District in Liberec Region, Czech Republic. The stream flows for 5.1 km, with a basin area measuring 6.7 km ².

The stream rises on the northern slopes of Černé Mountain (1085 m) in the Jizera Mountains at an altitude of 1035 m. The average flow at the mouth is 0.16 m³ / s. It flows mainly north. During its relatively short flow creates innumerable waterfalls and cascades. The outflow rushes through a stream northwards through, where there is the forest, dividing into several branches to the Strašice.
