= Bernsdorf, Upper Lusatia =

Bernsdorf
- Town
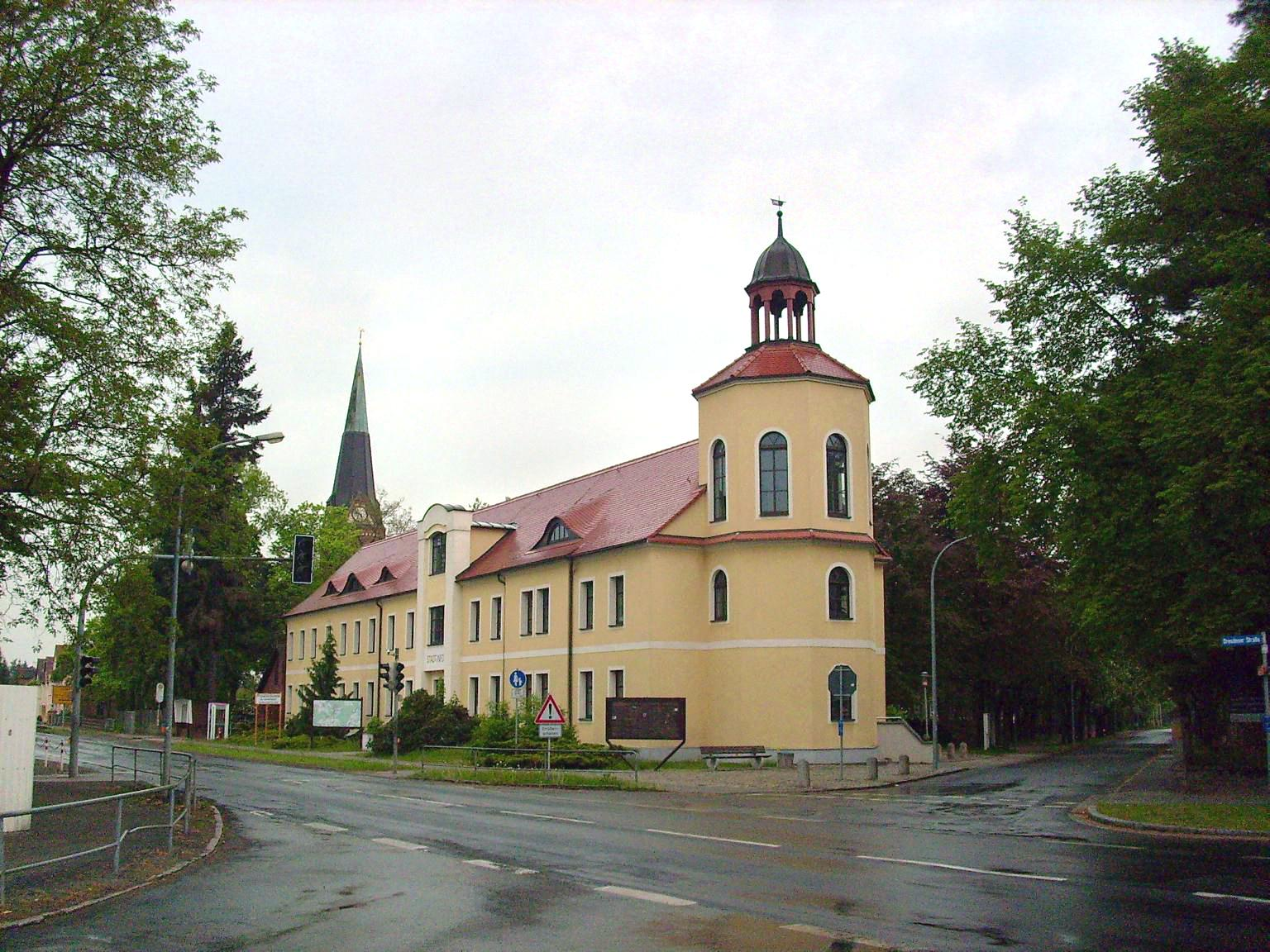

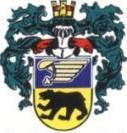
- Coat of arms

- Location of Bernsdorf within Bautzen district
- Interactive map of Bernsdorf
- Location within Germany Location within Saxony
- Coordinates: 51°22′N 14°4′E
- Country: Germany
- State: Saxony
- District: Bautzen
- Subdivisions: 4

Government
  - Mayor (2019–26): Harry Habel (CDU)

Area
  - Total: 59.87 km^{2} (23.12 sq mi)
- Elevation: 152 m (499 ft)

Population (2025-12-31)
  - Total: 6,191
  - Density: 103.4/km^{2} (267.8/sq mi)
- Time zone: UTC+01:00 (CET)
  - Summer (DST): UTC+02:00 (CEST)
- Postal codes: 02994
- Dialling codes: 035723
- Vehicle registration: BZ, BIW, HY, KM
- Website: www.bernsdorf.de

Bernsdorf (German: [ˈbɛʁnsˌdɔʁf]; Upper Sorbian: Njedźichow pronounced [ˈnʲɛdʒixɔf]) is a town in the district of Bautzen, in Upper Lusatia, Saxony, Germany. The town has 6,427 residents. It is 12 kilometres (7.5 mi) north of Kamenz and 15 kilometres (9.3 mi) southwest of Hoyerswerda. The town Bernsdorf consists of Bernsdorf proper and the Ortschaften (municipal divisions) Großgrabe, Straßgräbchen, Wiednitz and Zeißholz.

== History ==
Within Prussian Silesia (Province of Silesia 1815–1919 and 1938–41, Province of Lower Silesia 1919–38 and 1941–45), Bernsdorf was part of Landkreis Hoyerswerda. Within the East German Bezirk Cottbus, it was part of Kreis Hoyerswerda. Following German reunification in 1990, Bernsdorf became part of Saxony.

== International relations ==
Bernsdorf is twinned with:

- Quinsac (France), since 2006
- Steinenbronn (Germany), since German reunification

== Sons and daughters of the city ==
- Gerhard Möhwald (1920–2012), former mayor and honorary citizen
- Christian Rudolph (born 1949), athlete (hurdles)
