= Alliance 90/The Greens Saxony =

Alliance 90/The Greens Saxony Bündnis 90/Die Grünen Sachsen
- Abbreviation: Grüne
- Chairman: Coretta Storz; Martin Helbig
- Treasurer: Maik Hieronymus
- Founded: 29 September 1991; 35 years ago
- Headquarters: Dresden
- Membership (2025): 5,300 (Stand: Ende September 2025)
- Ideology: Green politics
- Political position: Centre-left
- National affiliation: Alliance 90/The Greens
- Colours: Green
- Landtag of Saxony: 7 / 120

Party flag

Website
- www.gruene-sachsen.de

Alliance 90/The Greens Saxony (German: Bündnis 90/Die Grünen Sachsen) is the regional state association of the Alliance 90/The Greens in the Free State of Saxony, Germany. With over 4,500 members, the state association is considered a medium-sized one within the Green Party in Germany.

== History ==
The Saxony state association of Alliance 90/The Greens was founded on 27 September 1991, in Zwickau at a joint general assembly of 137 members from Democracy Now, New Forum, the Independent Women's Association, and the Greens. The Saxon Green state association, which emerged from the Green Party in the GDR in 1990, did not join the West German Greens on 3 December 1990, the day after the federal elections, as did the other East German Green state associations, but postponed this decision.

The forerunners of the Green Party's state association were the four groups that ran together in the first Saxon state election in 1990 under the umbrella of the joint list "New Forum – Alliance – Greens (FORUM)", achieving 5.6% of the vote and entering the state parliament. Since then, ten members of the state parliament have represented Green positions, including well-known members of the Green Party's state association Klaus Gaber, Martin Böttger, Karl-Heinz Gerstenberg, and the long-serving parliamentary group leader Antje Hermenau. Thus, the Saxon state association of Alliance 90/The Greens was founded a year and a half before the merger of Alliance 90 and The Greens at the federal level. Other prominent members who were active in the Saxon state association in the 1990s include Gunda Röstel and Werner Schulz.

Even at that time, the Saxon state association of Alliance 90/The Greens stood out at the parliamentary level with thematic priorities on climate protection, the phase-out of lignite mining, genetic engineering, the promotion of regional economic cycles, waste and wastewater concepts, spatial planning and transport concepts, rock mining in the Saxon regions, the uranium mining of Wismut, the coming to terms with the GDR past, the provision of asylum seekers and citizen participation.

In the 1994 Saxony state election, the party failed to enter the state parliament, receiving only 4.1% of the second votes. While only three parties – the CDU, SPD, and PDS – were represented in the Saxon state parliament from then until 2004 , Alliance 90/The Greens remained firmly established at the local level with elected officials, even providing mayors in some municipalities.

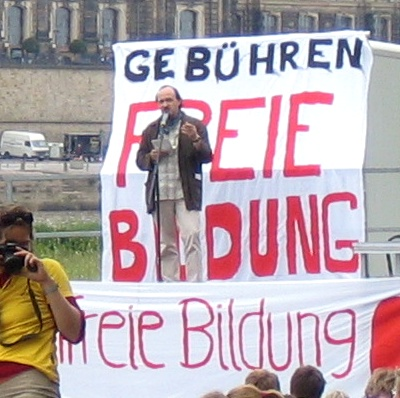
Karl-Heinz Gerstenberg at a student demonstration in Dresden

It wasn't until the 2004 Saxony state election that the Green Party in the state parliament, with 5.1% of the second votes, managed to re-enter the state parliament. The main themes of the election campaign were the fight against right-wing extremism, education and family policy, gender equality, and combating corruption. The lead candidate at the time, Antje Hermenau, who had previously been a member of the Bundestag (German Federal Parliament), became chair of the six-member Green Party parliamentary group in the state parliament. The long-time state chairman and now elected member of the state parliament, Karl-Heinz Gerstenberg, became the parliamentary manager of the parliamentary group.

In the 2009 Saxony state election, the party once again entered the state parliament with 6.4% of the second votes. In addition to lead candidate Antje Hermenau, who was confirmed as parliamentary group leader, eight other members of parliament were elected to represent the party. Karl-Heinz Gerstenberg again held the position of parliamentary managing director. Under the motto "Ecological – modern – cosmopolitan," the parliamentary group assumed an opposition role in the state parliament.

In the 2014 Saxony state election, the party entered the Saxon state election campaign for the first time with a dual leadership of Antje Hermenau and Volkmar Zschocke. They won 5.7 % of the second votes, securing a total of eight seats. Zschocke took over as parliamentary group leader, as Hermenau did not run for re-election. Valentin Lippmann was elected parliamentary managing director. Due to the mathematical possibility of a coalition with the CDU, exploratory talks with the CDU were held for the first time in the party's history, but these talks ultimately failed. Hermenau subsequently announced that she would not accept her seat in the state parliament. She was succeeded by Franziska Schubert, another newcomer to parliament. Of the eight Green Party members of parliament, only Eva Jähnigen had served in the previous state parliament.

At this time strongholds for the state party were the major cities of Dresden, Leipzig, Chemnitz, parts of the district of Meißen and the city of Freiberg.

In the 2000s, the Saxon Greens distinguished themselves through high-profile individual actions, such as their opposition to the construction of the Waldschlösschen Bridge in Dresden, and through consistent and reliable parliamentary work, particularly in the areas of education, higher education and budget policy. Despite their role as an opposition party in the state parliament, a Green Party motion for municipal commemorative days marking the 20th anniversary of the Peaceful Revolution was adopted by the state government. The Green state association also made its mark through its transportation policy initiatives; for example, the parliamentary group developed the Saxony-wide rail concept "SACHSENTAKT 21" for an integrated regular-interval timetable and called for the reconnection of Chemnitz to the long-distance rail network.

With the completely restructured parliamentary group in 2014, the range of topics addressed was broadened. In addition to ecology and practical nature conservation, environmental and climate protection, transport policy, and equality policy, the structural problems of large cities and rural areas were increasingly brought to public attention. Under its new parliamentary group leader, Wolfram Günther, the parliamentary group developed a distinct profile in housing policy and against excessive rent increases in Saxony's three major cities. t the same time, the Green parliamentary group addressed the decline of schools, police, courts, and administration in rural Saxony, thus establishing its profile in domestic and education policy. Among other things, the Greens called for the re-establishment of police stations in every town with 10,000 inhabitants or more, and this proposal met with a positive response in many places at the municipal level.

For the 2019 Saxony state election, the state association again selected Katja Meier and Wolfram Günther as its two lead candidates. In the state election, the party achieved its best result to date with 8.6 percent of the second votes. It sent 12 representatives to the Landtag of Saxony. Subsequently, it participated in government as part of the Kenya coalition with the Christian Democratic Union (CDU) and the Social Democratic Party (SPD). Katja Meier became Saxon State Minister of Justice and for Democracy, Europe and Equality, and Wolfram Günther became Saxon State Minister for Energy, Climate Protection, Environment and Agriculture, as well as First Deputy Minister-President in the second Kretschmer cabinet.

In the 2021 German federal election, Saxony achieved a result of 8.6 percent of the second votes and 7 percent of the first votes. As a result, four Saxon representatives – Paula Piechotta, Bernhard Herrmann, Merle Spellerberg and Kassem Taher Saleh were elected to the German Bundestag. The Greens formed the traffic light coalition lead by Olaf Scholz.

On 7 May 2024, Yvonne Mosler, the Green Party's lead candidate for the city council, was attacked by two people while putting up campaign posters in Dresden. Two posters that had been put up were also torn down. Mosler was accompanied by helpers and a film crew. According to the police, a 34-year-old German man is being investigated for assault, threats, insults, and property damage, and a 24-year-old German woman is being investigated for assault. The Hitler salute was also allegedly given by someone in the group. In the 2024 Saxony state election, the Greens narrowly managed to re-enter the state parliament. They were subsequently not part of the government again.

== Structure ==
=== Organisation ===
The state association is organized into 13 district associations, which are referred to as "city associations" in the major cities of Dresden, Leipzig, and Chemnitz. Below the district association level, there are sometimes regional groups or associations, and less frequently local associations. The state association is headed by the state executive committee. The state executive committee is usually re-elected every two years at a state assembly.

In 1992 the Green-Alternative Youth Alliance (GAJB) Saxony was founded in Leipzig, in the mid-1990s it renamed itself Green Youth Alliance (GJB) and later became part of the Federal Association of the Green Youth.

=== State Executive Committee ===
| Chairperson | Martin Helbig and Coretta Storz |
| Treasurer | Maik Hieronymus |
| Associate members | Monique Hänel, Andreas Spranger, Maria Untch |

=== Membership ===
Following the founding of the state association, membership grew to approximately 1,100 by the end of the 1990s. In the following years, membership declined, falling to around 850 by 2002. At that point, the trend reversed, and membership steadily increased, reaching 995 members in Saxony by the end of January 2009. The year 2009 saw a significant increase in membership for the Saxon Greens; by January 2010, the state association had 1,100 members, reaching its highest level to date. At the beginning of 2022, membership stood at 3,419. By September 2023, it had reached 3,538.

=== Representatives ===
From 1991 to 1994, Gunda Röstel and Heiko Weigel were the first state co-chairs of the Saxon Green Party. While Karl-Heinz Gerstenberg remained the male state chair continuously from 1994 to 2005, the female state spokespersons changed more frequently. Gerda Viecenz, Kornelia Müller, and Pino Olbrich each served as state spokesperson for at least two years, whereas there was no female state chair between 2003 and 2005. After the party entered the state parliament in 2004, Eva Jähnigen and Claus Krüger were elected state co-chairs the following year. Between 2007 and 2009, Rudolf Haas was the male spokesperson for the state party. In January 2010, Volkmar Zschocke was elected the new state spokesperson. The position of female state spokesperson remained vacant due to a lack of applicants. On November 6, 2010, Claudia Maicher was elected state spokesperson. Both were re-elected as state executive committee spokespersons on 3 March 2012. On 25/26 November 2016, Jürgen Kasek and Christin Melcher were elected as new co-chairs. In March 2018, Kasek was succeeded by Norman Volger.

In April 2022, Marie Müser announced her candidacy for the chairmanship of the Saxon state party. The incumbent, Norman Volger, declined to run. At the party conference on 14 May 2022, in Neukieritzsch, Müser was elected with 72.5 percent of the delegate votes. Christin Furtenbacher was elected state chairwoman in 2020 and re-elected in Neukieritzsch in 2022 with 91.4 percent of the vote. Furtenbacher resigned on 8 December 2024, one day after her re-election due to a lack of support within the party following a poor election result.

On 17 May 2025, Martin Helbig and Coretta Storz were elected as state chairpersons.

At the federal level, the party sent two Saxon representatives, Monika Lazar und Stephan Kühn to the German Bundestag. The Saxony state association has been represented in the European Parliament by Anna Cavazzini since 2019.

== Election results ==
=== State elections ===
Results of the state elections
| Election | Votes | Seats |
|---|---|---|
| 1990 | 5.6% | 10 / 160 |
| 1994 | 4.1% | 0 / 120 |
| 1999 | 2.6% | 0 / 120 |
| 2004 | 5.1% | 6 / 124 |
| 2009 | 6.4% | 9 / 132 |
| 2014 | 5.7% | 8 / 126 |
| 2019 | 8.6% | 12 / 119 |
| 2024 | 5.1% | 7 / 120 |

=== Federal elections ===
Results of the federal elections
| Year | First vote % | Second vote % | Mandates | Members |
|---|---|---|---|---|
| 1990 | 8.0 | 5.9 | 2 | Werner Schulz, Wolfgang Ullmann |
| 1994 | 4.2 | 4.8 | 2 | Antje Hermenau, Werner Schulz |
| 1998 | 3.8 | 4.4 | 2 | Antje Hermenau, Werner Schulz |
| 2002 | 3.5 | 4.6 | 2 | Antje Hermenau (until 2004)/Monika Lazar (from 2004), Peter Hettlich |
| 2005 | 3.6 | 4.8 | 2 | Peter Hettlich, Monika Lazar |
| 2009 | 6.0 | 6.7 | 2 | Stephan Kühn, Monika Lazar |
| 2013 | 4.5 | 4.9 | 2 | Stephan Kühn, Monika Lazar |
| 2017 | 4.5 | 4.6 | 2 | Monika Lazar, Stephan Kühn (until 2020)/Wolfgang Wetzel (from 2020) |
| 2021 | 7.0 | 8.6 | 4 | Bernhard Herrmann, Paula Piechotta, Kassem Taher Saleh, Merle Spellerberg |
| 2025 | 5.0 | 6.5 | 2 | Paula Piechotta, Kassem Taher Saleh |

== Literature ==
- Jakob Lempp: Bündnis 90/Die Grünen in Sachsen. In: Christian Demuth, Jakob Lempp: Parteien in Sachsen. be.bra wissenschaft verlag, Berlin 2006, ISBN 978-3-937233-35-2, S. 187–203. (2. Auflage 2007) (online: Special edition of the Saxon State Agency for Civic Education (2006)
