= Antje Hermenau =

German politician

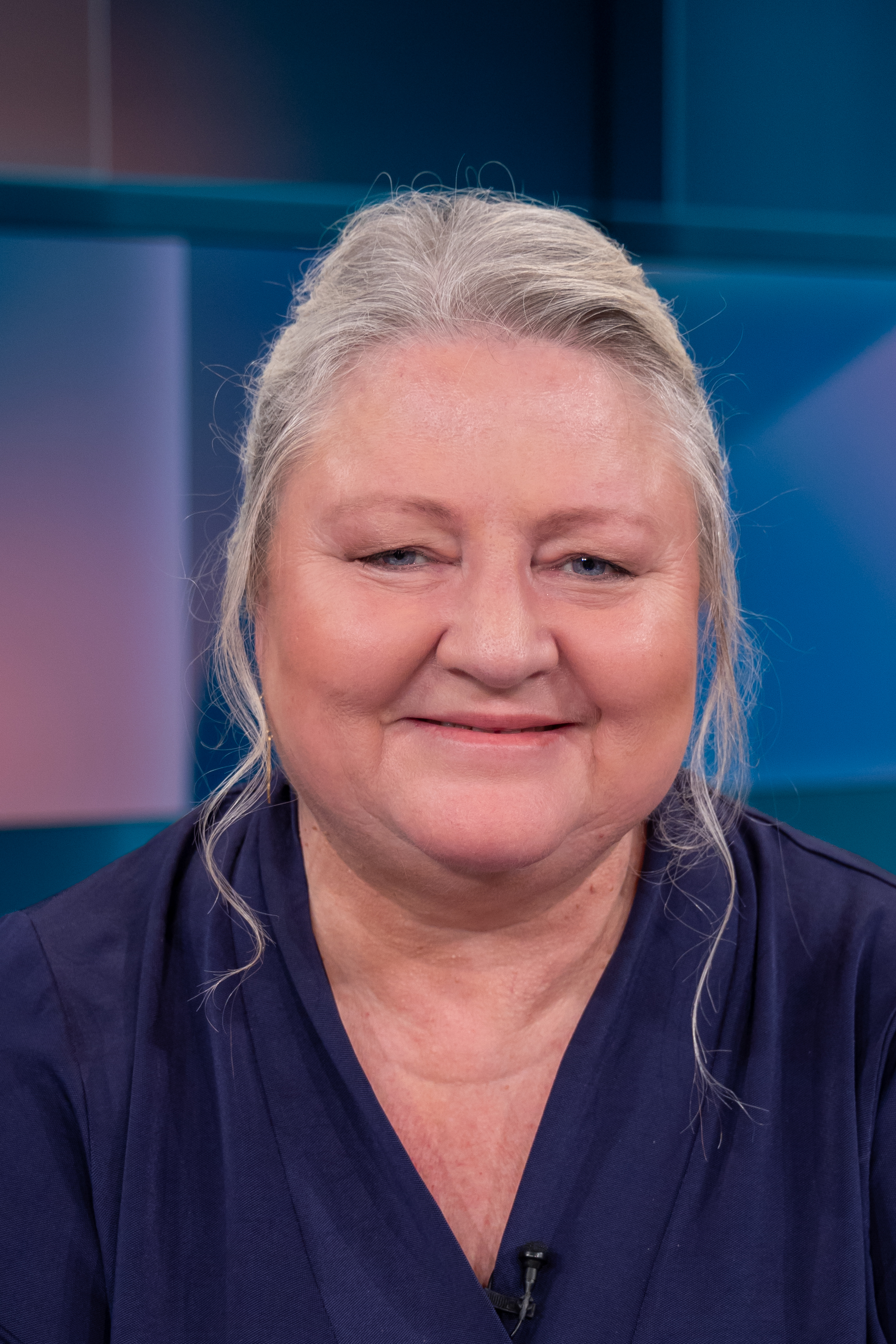
- Hermenau in 2024

Member of the Landtag of Saxony
- In office 19 October 2004 – 29 September 2014

Member of the German Bundestag
- In office 10 November 1994 – 19 December 2004

Personal details
- Born: 3 July 1964 (age 62) Leipzig, East Germany
- Party: Free Voters of Saxony (2019)
- Other political affiliations: Alliance 90/The Greens Saxony (until 2015)

Elisabeth Antje Sina Hermenau (previously Rush; born 3 July 1964 in Leipzig) is a German politician. Her political activities began during the period of German reunification, when she was a member of the Leipzig Round Table. From 1990 to 1994, Hermenau was a member of the Landtag of Saxony. Between 1994 and 2004, she was a member of the German Bundestag for the Alliance 90/The Greens. In 2004, after the Alliance 90/The Greens Saxony regained seats in the landtag, she resigned her Bundestag seat to serve as a member of parliament and parliamentary group leader for the Green Party in the Landtag of Saxony. In September 2014, Hermenau announced her resignation from all political offices. In January 2015, after 25 years, she left the party.

== Biography ==
Antje Hermenau was born on 3 July 1964, in Leipzig, the daughter of a housewife and a metalworker, and grew up in modest circumstances. She did not attend kindergarten or after-school care. She describes her childhood as free and independent, and experienced this time as formative.

In 1983, she graduated from the St. Thomas Extended Secondary School (EOS) in Leipzig and began studying to become a teacher of German and English at the Karl Marx Leipzig University that same year. During her studies, she worked part-time as a night watchwoman to become financially independent from her parents. With her diploma thesis on political vocabulary in the CSCE process, Hermenau earned her teaching degree in 1989. She then worked as a teacher at the 4th Secondary School in Leipzig. In 1990, she married the American David Rush. From 2000 to 2002, she pursued a part-time degree in administrative sciences at the German University of Administrative Sciences Speyer, graduating with a master's degree. She has not yet taken up a teaching position in the Saxon public service . After resigning from all political offices in September 2014, Hermenau registered a small business as a political consultant in Dresden. On 4 June 2016, Hermenau was elected Vice President of the Association of German-Language Speechwriters.

== Political career ==
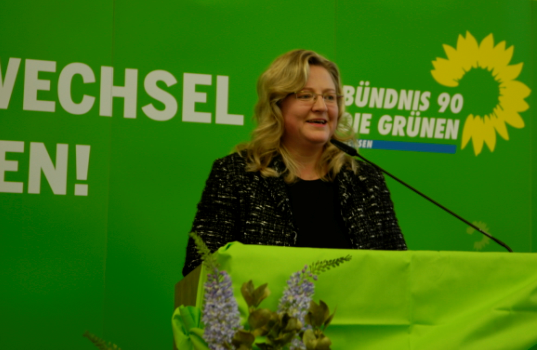
Antje Hermenau at the 2008 state party conference in Dresden

The events of the fall of the Berlin Wall and subsequent reunification politicized the Rush family. While her husband was active in the Democracy Now movement, Antje Rush became involved with the Green Party in East Germany. In February 1990, she took over the Green Party's seat on the Leipzig Round Table, where she met, among others, Wolfgang Tiefensee. She ran unsuccessfully for Leipzig City Council in the first free local elections in East Germany on 6 May 1990. Subsequently, she was the only woman involved in the founding of a Saxon state branch of the Green Party. At the founding assembly of the Green Party's state branch in Freiberg in September 1990, she was elected to the tenth spot on the joint list of the New Forum, other citizens' movements, and the Greens. There she also met future members of the Landtag of Saxony, Klaus Gaber and Kornelia Müller. In the first Saxony state elections on 14 October 1990, the joint list achieved 5.6% of the vote and ten seats. This made Rush the youngest of the Forum's ten parliamentary group members, who entered the first Landtag of Saxony. Within the parliamentary group, led by Klaus Gaber, she focused on education policy issues in Saxony.

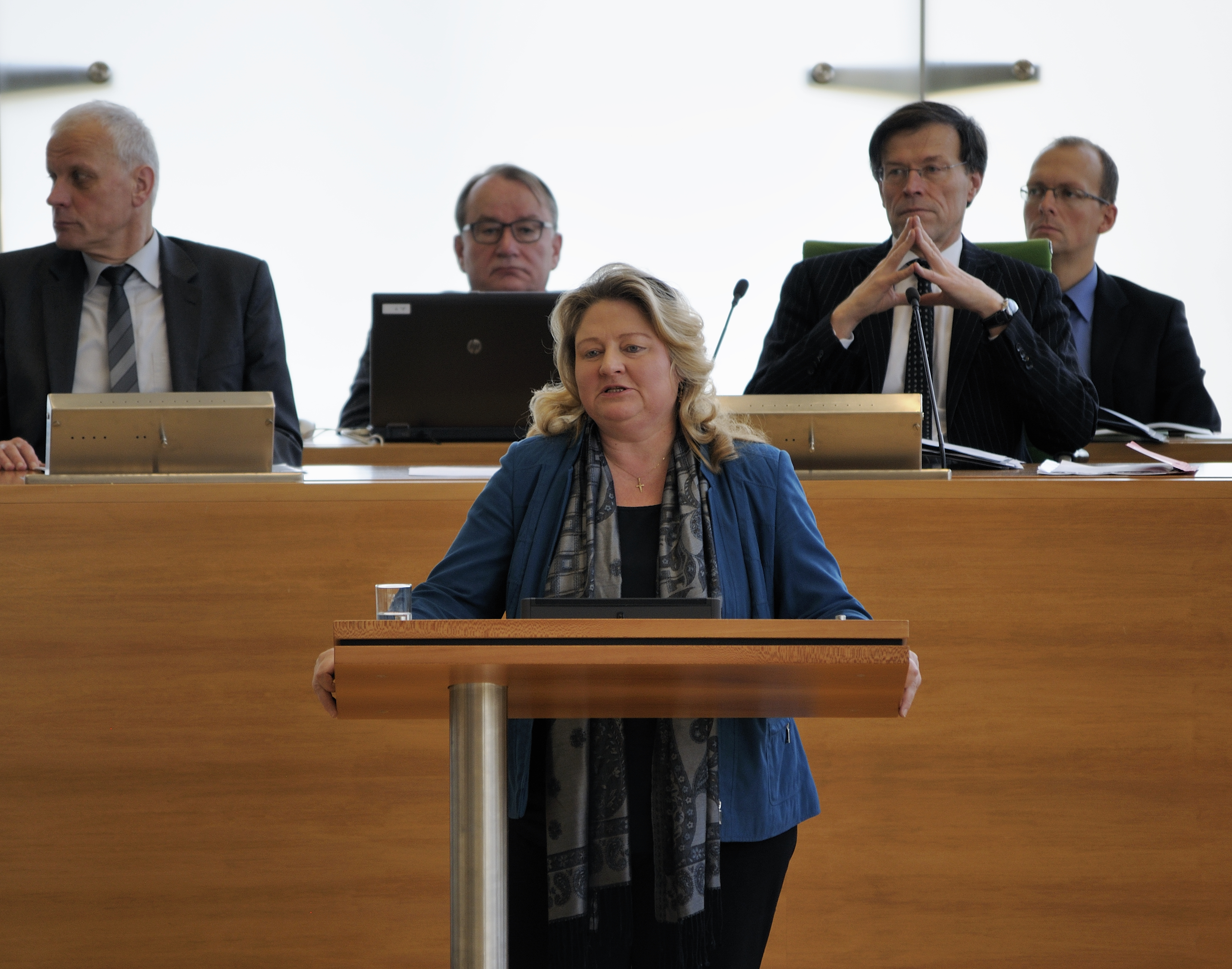
Antje Hermenau speaking in the Landtag of Saxony (2013)

In the election for the Saxon state list for the 1994 German federal election, Antje Rush was elected to second place behind Werner Schulz. After Alliance 90/The Greens failed to re-enter the state parliament on 11 September 1994, with 4.1% of the list votes, the party received 4.8% of the Saxon list votes in the election for the 13th German Bundestag five weeks later. The Saxon state association of Alliance 90/The Greens was entitled to send two representatives, and Hermenau became a member of the German Bundestag. There, she served on the Budget Committee. In 1998, Hermenau again entered the German Bundestag via the top spot on the Saxon Greens' state list. Once again, she was a member of the Budget Committee.

In the 2004 Saxony state election, she was the lead candidate for the Green Party. During the election campaign, in which Alliance 90/The Greens focused on environmental issues, school and university policy, and culture, Antje Hermenau represented the Green Party's state association. Under the slogan "Saxony's Green Power Woman: Antje Hermenau," the Saxon Greens pursued a form of personalization in their state election campaign. With this election, the Green Party in Saxony, with 5.1% of the list votes (6 seats), succeeded in returning to the Saxon State Parliament. Among other things, the early and relatively uncontroversial agreement on Hermenau as the lead candidate and her commitment to relinquish her seat in the Bundestag upon entering the State Parliament are considered several factors in the Greens' success. Monika Lazar from the district of Leipzig took over the vacated seat in the Bundestag.

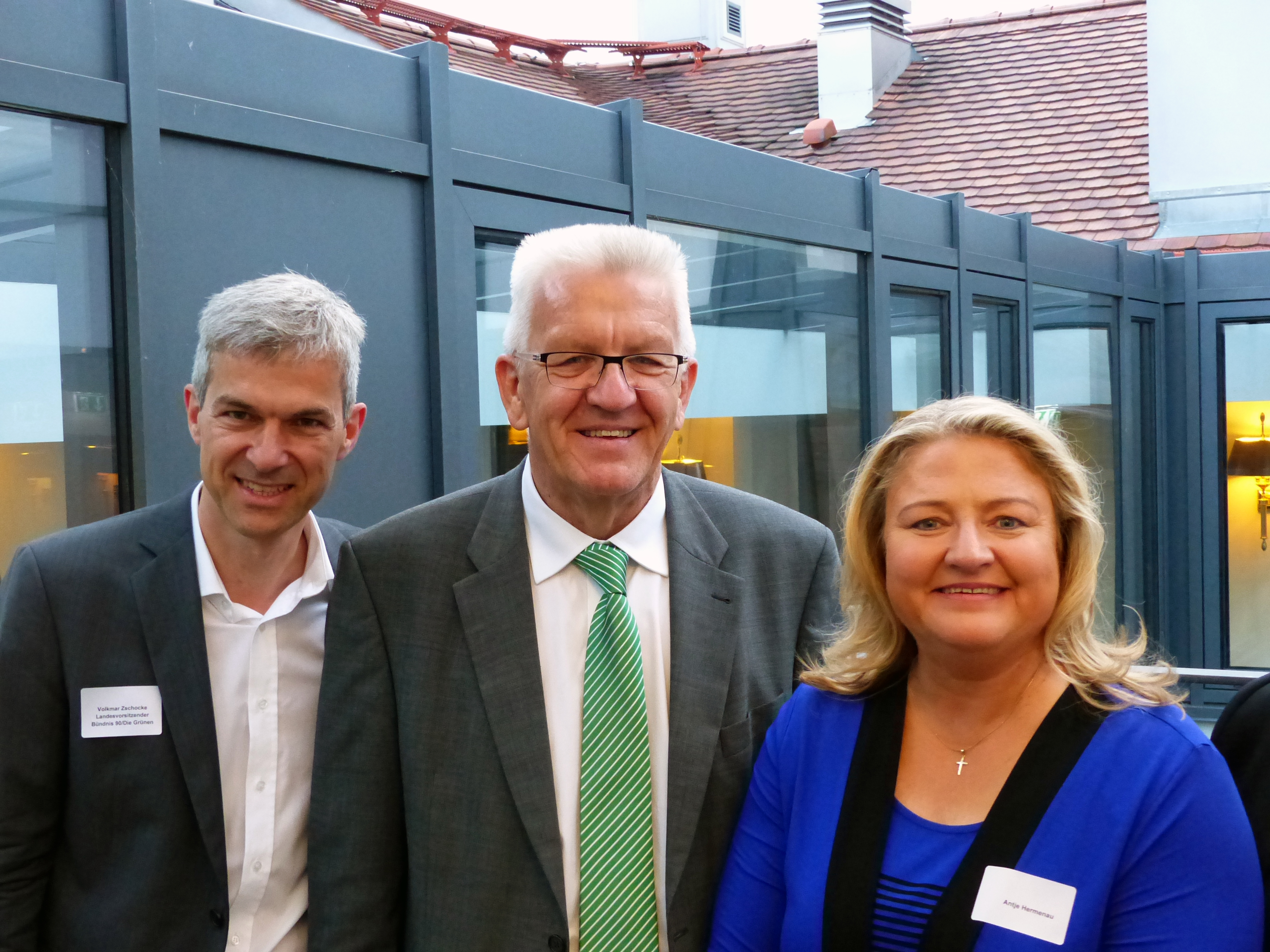
Antje Hermenau together with Winfried Kretschmann and Volkmar Zschocke in the 2014 state election campaign

On 10 June 2007, Antje Hermenau presented the idea of a collective tax cut for all women . She argued that it could offset the average income deficit of women in Germany. According to her, this was a form of "positive discrimination," which was preferable to negative discrimination.

In the state election on 30 August 2009, Alliance 90/The Greens, with their lead candidate Antje Hermenau, achieved 6.4 percent of the vote (9 seats). Antje Hermenau was re-elected as parliamentary group leader. For her statement, "If I wanted to discuss anything with the Saxony FDP on an equal footing, I would have to lie flat on the floor," Hermenau was awarded the quote of the year at the State Press Conference's summer party on 17 June 2010.

Together with three other parliamentary group leaders, Martin Dulig (SPD), Holger Zastrow (FDP) and Steffen Flath (CDU), Hermenau was awarded the Sächsische Verfassungsmedaille by State Parliament President Matthias Rößler on 24 May 2014, in recognition of her work in securing the inclusion of the prohibition on new debt in the Saxon Constitution.

In the state election on 31 August 2014, in which the Greens received 5.7% of the vote, she was her party's lead candidate. Subsequently, on 4 September 2014, she announced her withdrawal from the race for parliamentary group leadership, a position she had held since 2004. After a state party conference on 20 September 2014, voted against entering into coalition negotiations with the CDU Saxony following two exploratory talks, she announced her withdrawal from active politics. She explained her decision by stating that she considered it wrong for the Greens to position themselves as a left-wing party and to reject the black-green option, which the state association had campaigned on.

Together with mayor of Grimma Matthias Berger, Hermenau has been a prominent figure in the new "Citizens' Movement for Saxony" since autumn 2018, a self-described political "centrist movement".

In the 2019 Saxony state election, she unsuccessfully ran for the Free Voters of Saxony in 20th place on their list for the Landtag of Saxony.

== Author ==
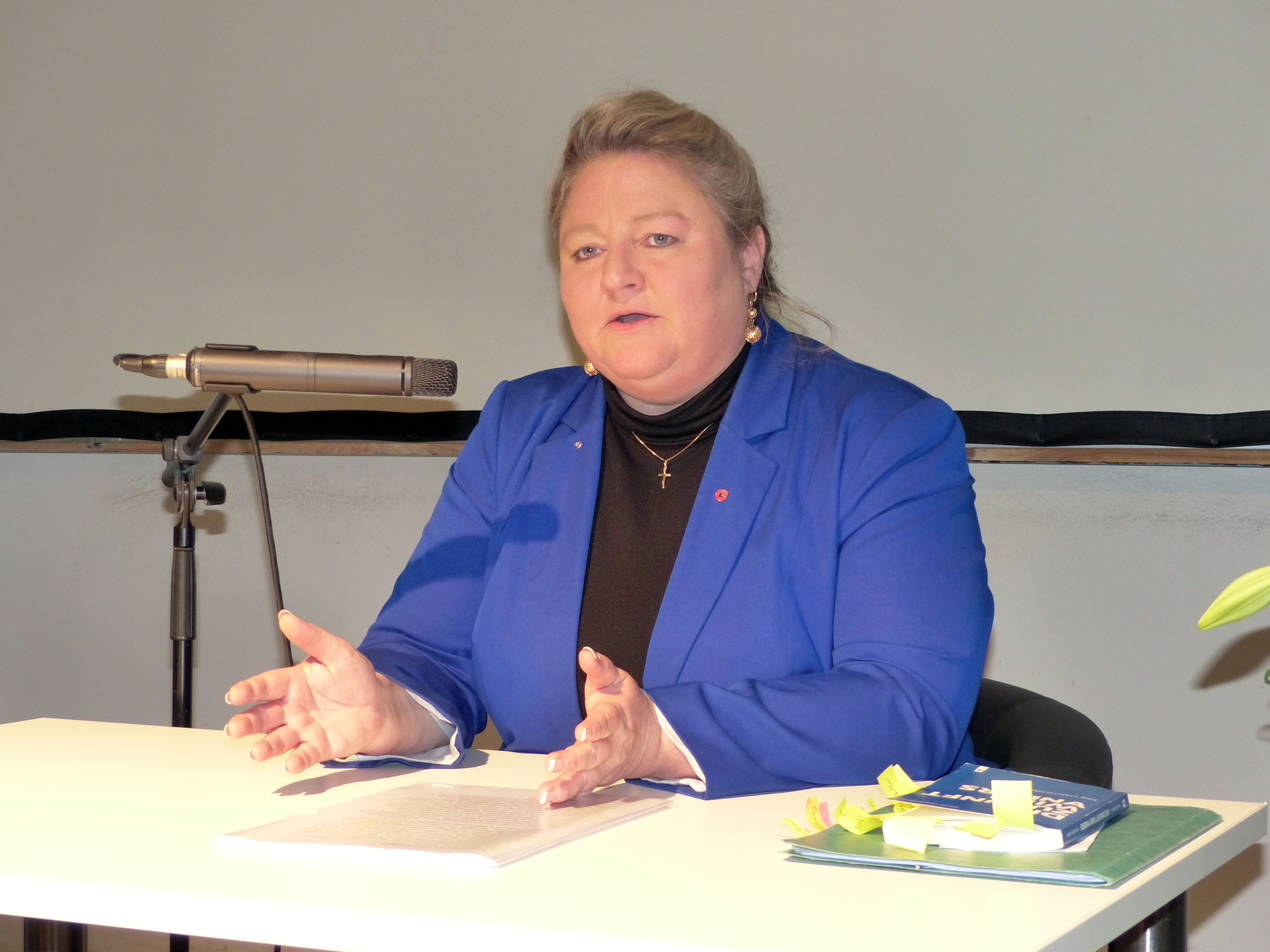
Book reading by Antje Hermenau 2015 in Dresden

Since leaving politics, she has worked as an author and political consultant for organizations and companies. In the fall of 2015, she published a polemical essay entitled The Future Will Be Different on global issues of social and economic development. A year later, she attracted attention by giving a reading from her book at an event organized by the AfD.

Tobias Heimbach, among others, wrote in the daily newspaper Die Welt that there had been “outraged reactions on social media". Hermenau justified her willingness to engage in dialogue with the AfD by saying that a democracy thrives on dialogue, which the then-chairman of the Bündnis 90/Die Grünen Sachsen Jürgen Kasek, described as “political prostitution by enemies of democracy.

== Publications ==
- Die Zukunft wird anders. Eine Streitschrift. Verlag Hille, Dresden 2015, ISBN 978-3-939025-63-4.
- Ansichten aus der Mitte Europas. Wie Sachsen die Welt sehen. Evangelische Verlagsanstalt, Leipzig 2019, ISBN 978-3-374-05932-4.
- Das große Egal. Essay (Reihe EXIL). BuchHaus Loschwitz, Dresden 2022, ISBN 978-3-9824237-3-9.

== Literature ==
- Antje Hermenau in: Internationales Biographisches Archiv 14/2007 vom 7. April 2007, im Munzinger-Archiv (Artikelanfang frei abrufbar)
