= Leipzig 3 =

State electoral district of Germany

27: Leipzig 3
- Electoral district for the Landtag of Saxony
- Leipzig 3 in 2024
- District: Leipzig
- Electorate: 51,596 (2024)
- Major settlements: City-district Nord excluding the sub-districts of Seehausen and Wiederitzsch, and sub-district of Zentrum-Nord (Mitte)

Current electoral district
- Party: CDU
- Member: Wolf-Dietrich Rost

Leipzig 3 is an electoral constituency (German: Wahlkreis) represented in the Landtag of Saxony. It elects one member via first-past-the-post voting. Under the constituency numbering system, it is designated as constituency 27. It is within the city of Leipzig.

== Geography ==
The constituency comprises the district of Nord excluding the sub-districts of Seehausen and Wiederitzsch, and the sub-district of Zentrum-Nord of district Mitte within the City of Leipzig.

There were 51,596 eligible voters in 2024.

== Members ==
Election	Member	Party	%
2014	Andreas Nowak	CDU	31.3
2019	Andreas Nowak	CDU	28.3
2024	Wolf-Dietrich Rost	CDU	29.8

== Election results ==
=== 2024 election ===
State election (2024): Leipzig 3
Notes:	Blue background denotes the winner of the electorate vote. Pink background denotes a candidate elected from their party list. Yellow background denotes an electorate win by a list member, or other incumbent. A ✓ or ✗ denotes status of any incumbent, win or lose respectively.						
Party	Candidate	Votes	%	±%	Party votes	%	±%
CDU	Wolf-Dietrich Rost	11,556	29.8	▲3.5	11,084	28.5	▲1.2
AfD	Christoph Neumann	7,036	18.1	▲2.1	6,645	17.1	▲1.6
Greens	P. Maria Cagali Sejdi	5,987	15.4	▼2.3	4,655	12.0	▼7.2
SPD	Bettina van Suntum	4,516	11.6	▼0.8	5,374	13.8	▲3.1
BSW	Sascha Jecht	3,565	9.2		4,174	10.7	
Left	Cornelia Falken	3,452	8.9	▼8.3	3,640	9.4	▼3.1
PARTEI	Oliver Gaden	1,125	2.9	▲2.5	615	1.6	▼1.2
FW	Jochen Reitstätter	919	2.4	▼1.8	696	1.8	▼0.9
FDP	Robin Schaluschke	633	1.6	▼3.6	574	1.5	▼3.4
APT					443	1.1	
Freie Sachsen					282	0.7	
Pirates					175	0.5	
V-Partei3					150	0.4	
BD					102	0.3	
dieBasis					92	0.2	
Values					67	0.2	
ÖDP					49	0.1	
Bündnis C					36	0.1	
BüSo					32	0.1	
Informal votes		308			212		
Total valid votes		38,789			38,885		
Turnout		39,097	75.8	▲13.9			
CDU hold	Majority	4,520	11.7				

=== 2019 election ===
State election (2019): Leipzig 3
Notes:	Blue background denotes the winner of the electorate vote. Pink background denotes a candidate elected from their party list. Yellow background denotes an electorate win by a list member, or other incumbent. A ✓ or ✗ denotes status of any incumbent, win or lose respectively.						
Party	Candidate	Votes	%	±%	Party votes	%	±%
CDU	✓ Andreas Nowak	10,722	28.3	▼3.0	11,026	29.0	▼3.9
AfD	Petra Böhme	9,944	26.3	▲17.8	9,501	25.0	▲16.2
Left	Adam Bednarsky	7,842	20.7	▼9.2	5,737	15.1	▼11.5
Greens	Petra Cagalj Sejdi	3,160	8.3	▲3.3	3,340	8.8	▲3.4
SPD	Waltra Heinke	3,002	7.9	▼7.7	3,607	9.5	▼5.6
FDP	Friedrich Vosberg	1,517	4.0	▲0.9	1,303	3.4	▲0.4
FW	Monika Baier	1,400	3.7	▲2.6	1,003	2.6	▲1.8
APT					783	2.1	▲0.8
PARTEI					666	1.8	▲1.3
Verjüngungsforschung					230	0.6	
NPD					170	0.4	▼3.8
The Blue Party					149	0.4	
Pirates					137	0.4	▼0.6
Humanists					93	0.2	
ÖDP					80	0.2	
Awakening of German Patriots - Central Germany					62	0.2	
DKP					61	0.2	
BüSo	Birigtta Gündler	262	0.7	▲0.3	59	0.2	Steady
PDV					43	0.1	
Informal votes		576			375		
Total valid votes		37,849			38,050		
Turnout		38,425	58.9	▲18.7			
CDU hold	Majority	778	2.0	▲0.6			

=== 2014 election ===
State election (2014): Leipzig 3
Notes:	Blue background denotes the winner of the electorate vote. Pink background denotes a candidate elected from their party list. Yellow background denotes an electorate win by a list member, or other incumbent. A ✓ or ✗ denotes status of any incumbent, win or lose respectively.						
Party	Candidate	Votes	%	±%	Party votes	%	±%
CDU	Andreas Nowak	8,081	31.3		8,496	32.9	
Left		7,721	29.9		6,869	26.6	
SPD		4,022	15.6		3,906	15.1	
AfD		2,206	8.5		2,272	8.8	
Greens		1,284	5.0		1,395	5.4	
NPD		957	3.7		1,082	4.2	
FDP		805	3.1		768	3.0	
APT					342	1.3	
Pirates		356	1.4		258	1.0	
FW		295	1.1		200	0.8	
PARTEI					130	0.5	
BüSo		105	0.4		60	0.2	
Pro Germany Citizens' Movement					50	0.2	
DSU					34	0.1	
Informal votes		380			350		
Total valid votes		25,832			25,862		
Turnout		26,212	40.2	▼14.4			
CDU win new seat	Majority	360	1.4				

== See also ==
- Politics of Saxony
- Landtag of Saxony
