= Green–yellow coalition =

FDP–Green coalition in Germany

The parties involved

Alliance 90/The Greens

Free Democratic Party

In Germany, a green–yellow coalition (German: Grün-gelbe Koalition) (also called a lime coalition or citrus coalition) is a coalition between the Alliance 90/The Greens (green party colour) and the Free Democratic Party (yellow party colour). It was first discussed before the 2021 Baden-Württemberg state election, when the possibility of a new governing coalition at the state level became apparent. It has not been considered at the federal level.

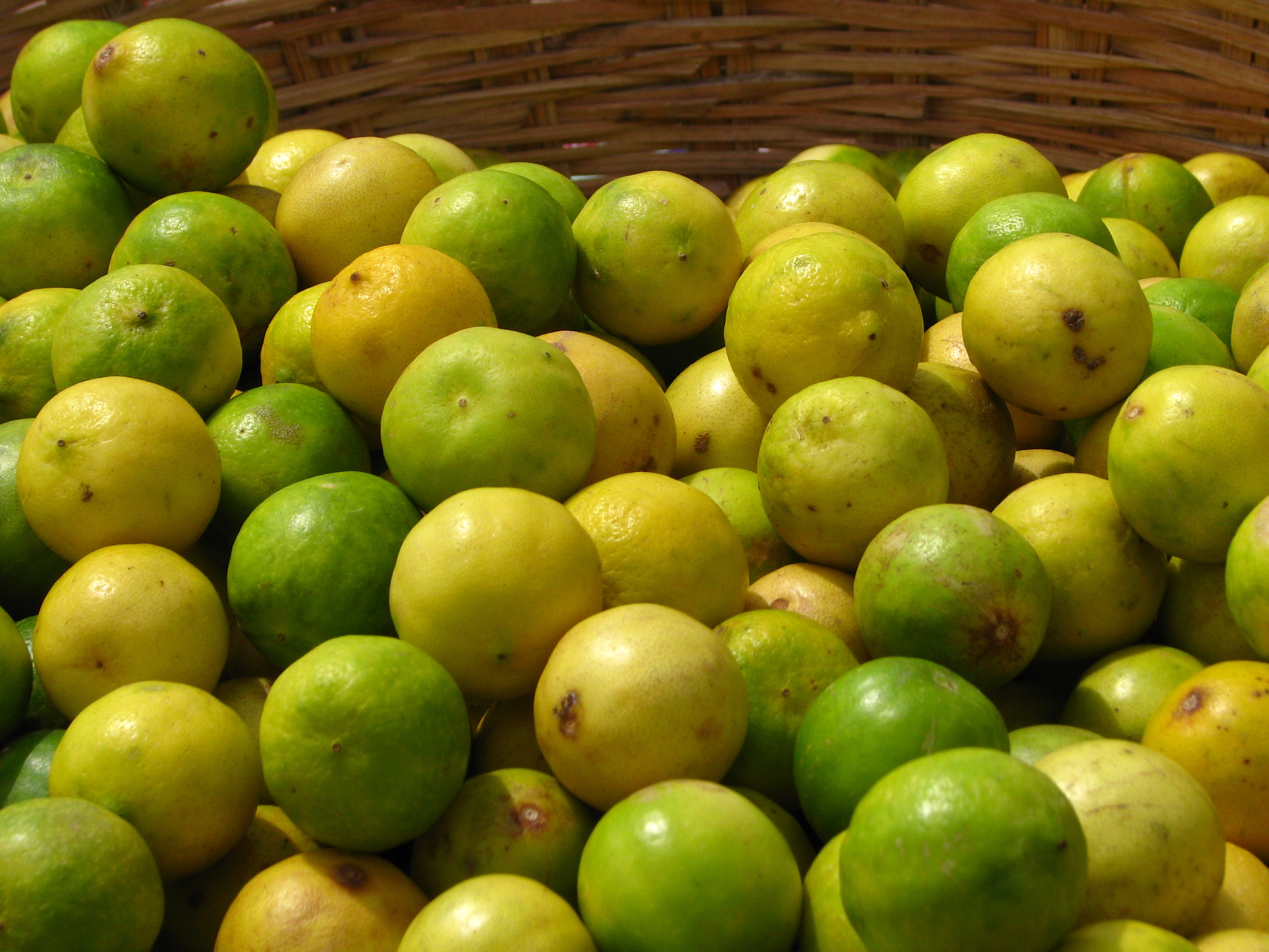
Limes at different stages of ripeness

== State level ==
In August 2019, FDP politician Michael Theurer expressed his openness to the formation of a green-yellow coalition after the 2021 state election in Baden-Württemberg. In the same year, Hans-Ulrich Rülke, chairman of the FDP parliamentary group in the state parliament, also declared that a green-yellow coalition was a realistic option. Shortly before election day, Rülke declared that if Winfried Kretschmann withdrew during the legislative period, the FDP would also vote for a successor from the Greens in order to continue a coalition. Ultimately, a possible green-yellow coalition missed the absolute majority in the Landtag of Baden-Württemberg by two seats.

== Municipal level ==
After the 2016 local elections in Hesse, such an alliance was formed for the first time nationwide in the Hessian municipality of Großkrotzenburg. The Green-Yellow coalition collapsed six months before the 2021 local elections in Hesse.
