= Round table (discussion) =

Academic debate format

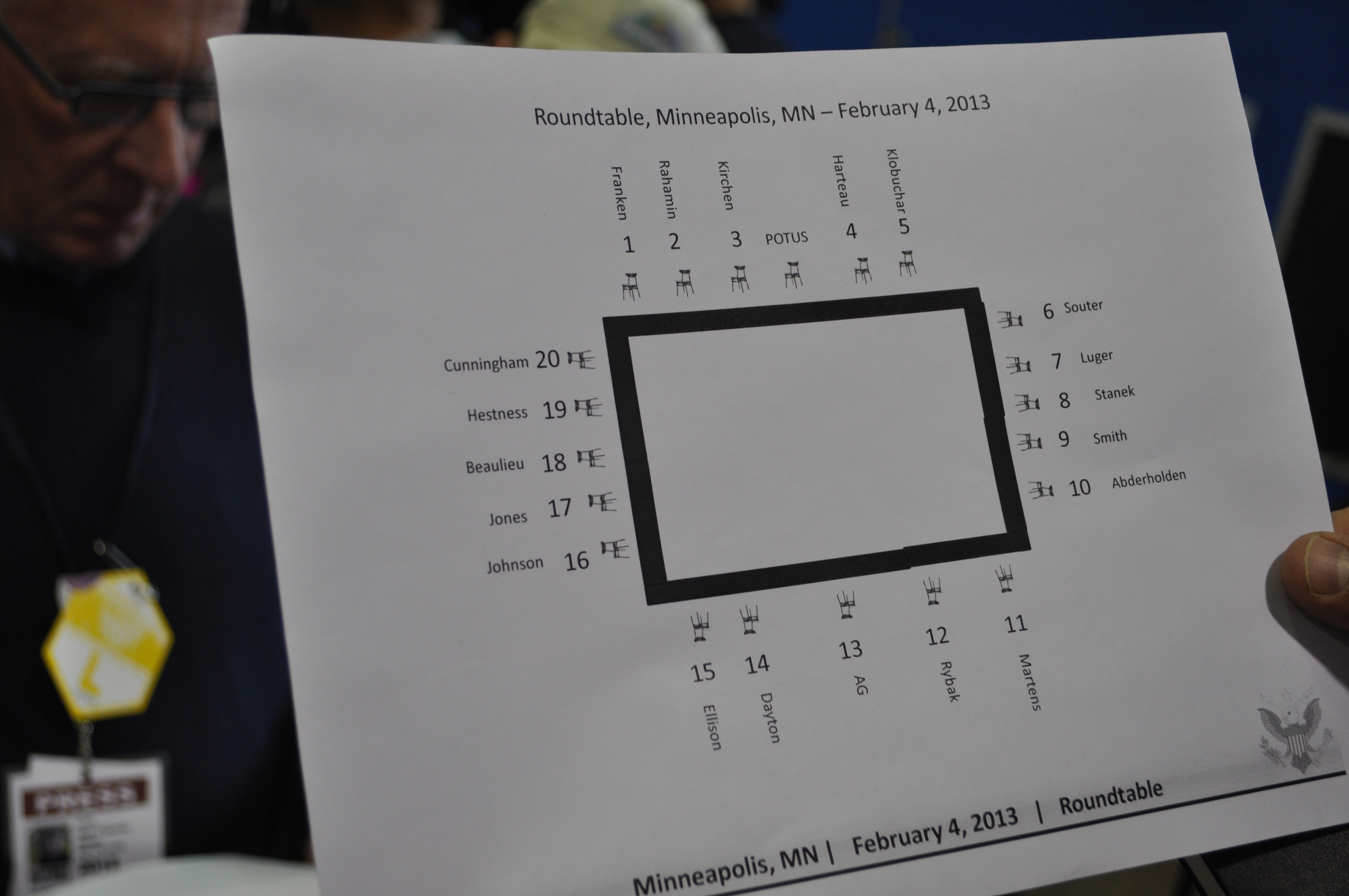
Round table with Barack Obama in Minneapolis

Round table is a form of academic discussion. Participants agree on a specific topic to discuss and debate. Each person is given equal right to participate, as illustrated by the idea of a circular layout referred to in the term round table.

Round-table discussions, together with houses of hospitality and agronomic universities, is one of the key elements of the Catholic Worker Movement, as formulated by Peter Maurin, one of the co-founders of the movement.

Round table discussions are also a common feature of political talk shows. Talk shows such as Washington Week and Meet the Press have roundtables of reporters or pundits. Most of these are done around a table in a studio, but occasionally they report in split-screen from remote locations. Some sports shows, such as ESPN's Around the Horn, employ a virtual augmented reality round table format. The round table method is still highly used to this day.

== See also ==
- Academic conference
