= Leipzig 5 =

State electoral district of Germany

29: Leipzig 5
- Electoral district for the Landtag of Saxony
- Leipzig 5 in 2024
- District: Leipzig
- Electorate: 60,331 (2024)
- Major settlements: City-district West, and city-district Südwest excluding the sub-districts of Schleußig and Plagwitz

Current electoral district
- Party: CDU
- Member: Andreas Nowak

Leipzig 5 is an electoral constituency (German: Wahlkreis) represented in the Landtag of Saxony. It elects one member via first-past-the-post voting. Under the constituency numbering system, it is designated as constituency 29. It is within the city of Leipzig.

== Geography ==
The constituency comprises the district of West, and district Südwest excluding the sub-districts of Schleußig and Plagwitz within the City of Leipzig.

There were 60,331 eligible voters in 2024.

== Members ==
Election	Member	Party	%
2014	Christine Clauß	CDU	25.2
2019	Christin Melcher	Grüne	29.0
2024	Andreas Nowak	CDU	32.9

== Election results ==
=== 2024 election ===
State election (2024): Leipzig 5
Notes:	Blue background denotes the winner of the electorate vote. Pink background denotes a candidate elected from their party list. Yellow background denotes an electorate win by a list member, or other incumbent. A ✓ or ✗ denotes status of any incumbent, win or lose respectively.						
Party	Candidate	Votes	%	±%	Party votes	%	±%
CDU	Andreas Nowak	13,321	32.9	▲5.1	12,048	29.6	▲1.2
AfD	Petra Böhme	11,895	29.4	▲3.2	11,054	27.2	▲2.3
Left	Adam Bednarsky	4,332	10.7	▼10.7	3,120	7.7	▼8.0
BSW	Brunhild Fischer	4,294	10.6		5,287	13.0	
SPD	Sascha Kodytek	2,747	6.8	▼1.2	3,743	9.2	▼0.4
Greens	Rainer Müller	1,951	4.8	▼3.6	2,314	5.7	▼3.3
FW	Matthias Binner	1,233	3.0	▼0.7	794	2.0	▼0.7
APT					531	1.3	
Freie Sachsen					502	1.2	
PARTEI					476	1.2	▼0.6
FDP	Ralf-Peter Wirth	749	1.8	▼2.0	342	0.8	▼2.4
Pirates					124	0.3	
BD					102	0.3	
V-Partei3					88	0.2	
dieBasis					68	0.2	
Values					37	0.1	
Bündnis C					36	0.1	
BüSo					21	0.1	
ÖDP					18	0.0	
Informal votes		564			381		
Total valid votes		40,522			40,705		
Turnout		41,086	68.1	▲16.0			
CDU win new seat	Majority	1,426	3.5				

=== 2019 election ===
State election (2019): Leipzig 5
Notes:	Blue background denotes the winner of the electorate vote. Pink background denotes a candidate elected from their party list. Yellow background denotes an electorate win by a list member, or other incumbent. A ✓ or ✗ denotes status of any incumbent, win or lose respectively.						
Party	Candidate	Votes	%	±%	Party votes	%	±%
Greens	Christin Melcher	12,893	29.0	▲10.3	11,880	26.7	▲10.6
CDU	Robert Clemen	9,160	20.6	▼4.6	10,052	22.6	▼3.0
Left	Beate Ehms	8,162	18.4	▼5.1	7,273	16.4	▼5.2
SPD	Dirk Panter	4,749	10.7	▼6.8	4,822	10.8	▼7.0
AfD	Jörg Kühne	4,557	10.3	▲5.2	4,525	10.2	▲4.6
FDP	Michael Pfüller	2,029	4.6	▲0.8	2,163	4.9	▲0.9
PARTEI	Michael Nagy	1,655	3.7		1,331	3.0	▲1.3
FW	André Soudah	1,183	2.7	▲1.1	742	1.7	▲0.7
APT					653	1.5	▼0.2
ÖDP					230	0.5	
Humanists					206	0.5	
Pirates					184	0.4	▼2.2
Verjüngungsforschung					159	0.4	
The Blue Party					70	0.2	
NPD					56	0.1	▼1.7
DKP					42	0.1	
PDV					32	0.1	
Awakening of German Patriots - Central Germany					31	0.1	
BüSo					23	0.1	▼0.1
Informal votes		287			201		
Total valid votes		44,388			44,474		
Turnout		44,675	70.4	▲21.1			
Greens gain from CDU	Majority	3,733	8.4				

=== 2014 election ===
State election (2014): Leipzig 5
Notes:	Blue background denotes the winner of the electorate vote. Pink background denotes a candidate elected from their party list. Yellow background denotes an electorate win by a list member, or other incumbent. A ✓ or ✗ denotes status of any incumbent, win or lose respectively.						
Party	Candidate	Votes	%	±%	Party votes	%	±%
CDU	Christine Clauß	7,151	25.2		7,300	25.6	
Left		6,685	23.5		6,160	21.6	
Greens		5,322	18.7		4,577	16.1	
SPD		4,973	17.5		5,082	17.8	
AfD		1,446	5.1		1,602	5.6	
FDP		1,078	3.8		1,147	4.0	
Pirates		715	2.5		745	2.6	
FW		458	1.6		294	1.0	
NPD		447	1.6		516	1.8	
PARTEI					479	1.7	
APT					471	1.7	
BüSo		149	0.5		66	0.2	
Pro Germany Citizens' Movement					36	0.1	
DSU					21	0.1	
Informal votes		315			243		
Total valid votes		28,424			28,496		
Turnout		28,739	49.3	▲4.0			
CDU win new seat	Majority	466	1.7				

== See also ==
- Politics of Saxony
- Landtag of Saxony
