= Wolfgang Wetzel =

German politician (born 1968)

Member of the Bundestag
- In office 21 October 2020 – October 2021

Personal details
- Born: 11 May 1968 (age 57) Schlema, East Germany (now Germany)
- Party: Greens

Wolfgang Wetzel (born 11 May 1968) is a German politician. Born in Schlema, he represents the Alliance 90/The Greens. Wolfgang Wetzel served as a member of the Bundestag from the state of Saxony from 2020 to October 2021.

== Political career ==
Wetzel became a member of the Bundestag in 2020 when he replaced Stephan Kühn, who had resigned. In parliament, he has since been serving on the Petitions Committee.
