= Marie Müser =

German politician (born 1997)

- Marie Müser in 2026

State Chairwoman of Alliance 90/The Greens Saxony
- In office 2022–2025

Personal details
- Born: 1997 (age 28–29) Leipzig, Germany
- Party: Alliance 90/The Greens
- Education: Martin Luther University Halle-Wittenberg

Marie Rose Müser (born 1997) is a German politician. She was the state chairwoman of Alliance 90/The Greens Saxony from 2022 to 2025.

== Education ==
After graduating from the Friedrich-Schiller-Schule in Leipzig Marie Müser began her bachelor's degree in political science and education at Martin Luther University Halle-Wittenberg in 2017. She completed her studies in political science and economics in 2022. In 2025, she began studying at the Hertie School in Berlin.

== Political career ==
She has been politically active with the Green Party (Alliance 90/The Greens) since 2018. In the 2019 Saxony local election, she ran for office in the Leipzig 2 constituency. In 2020, she was elected to the Saxony state party council of the Green Party (Alliance 90/The Greens) and also represented the Grüne Jugend of Saxony there.

In the 2021 German federal election, Marie Müser was the direct candidate in the Leipzig I constituency and was number 7 on her party's Saxony state list. She was the youngest list candidate in Saxony. With 11.9% of the vote, she increased the first-vote result by 6.4 percentage points compared to the 2017 federal election. However, she lost to the CDU's direct candidate, Jens Lehmann, and also failed to win a seat in the Bundestag via the state list.

In November 2021, she was elected to the executive committee of the Leipzig Green Party at the party's city convention. In April 2022, she announced her candidacy for the chairmanship of the Saxon state party. She challenged the incumbent in Leipzig, Norman Volger, who later withdrew his candidacy. At the party convention on 14 May 2022, in Neukieritzsch, she was elected with 72.5 percent of the delegate votes. This made her the youngest party chair among the major parties in Saxony. Together with her co-chair, Christin Furtenbacher, she formed the first all-female leadership duo of the Greens in Saxony. Müser was responsible for European and international coordination on the executive committee. Müser did not run for re-election to the state executive committee in May 2025.

== Political positions ==
Since her school days, Müser has been actively campaigning against right-wing extremism and states that she became politically active through the Legida protests in 2015. Later, she volunteered to help integrate refugees in the Leipzig area. She is active in the action network “Aktionsnetzwerk Leipzig nimmt Platz”.
