= Andreas Nowak =

German politician (born 1975)

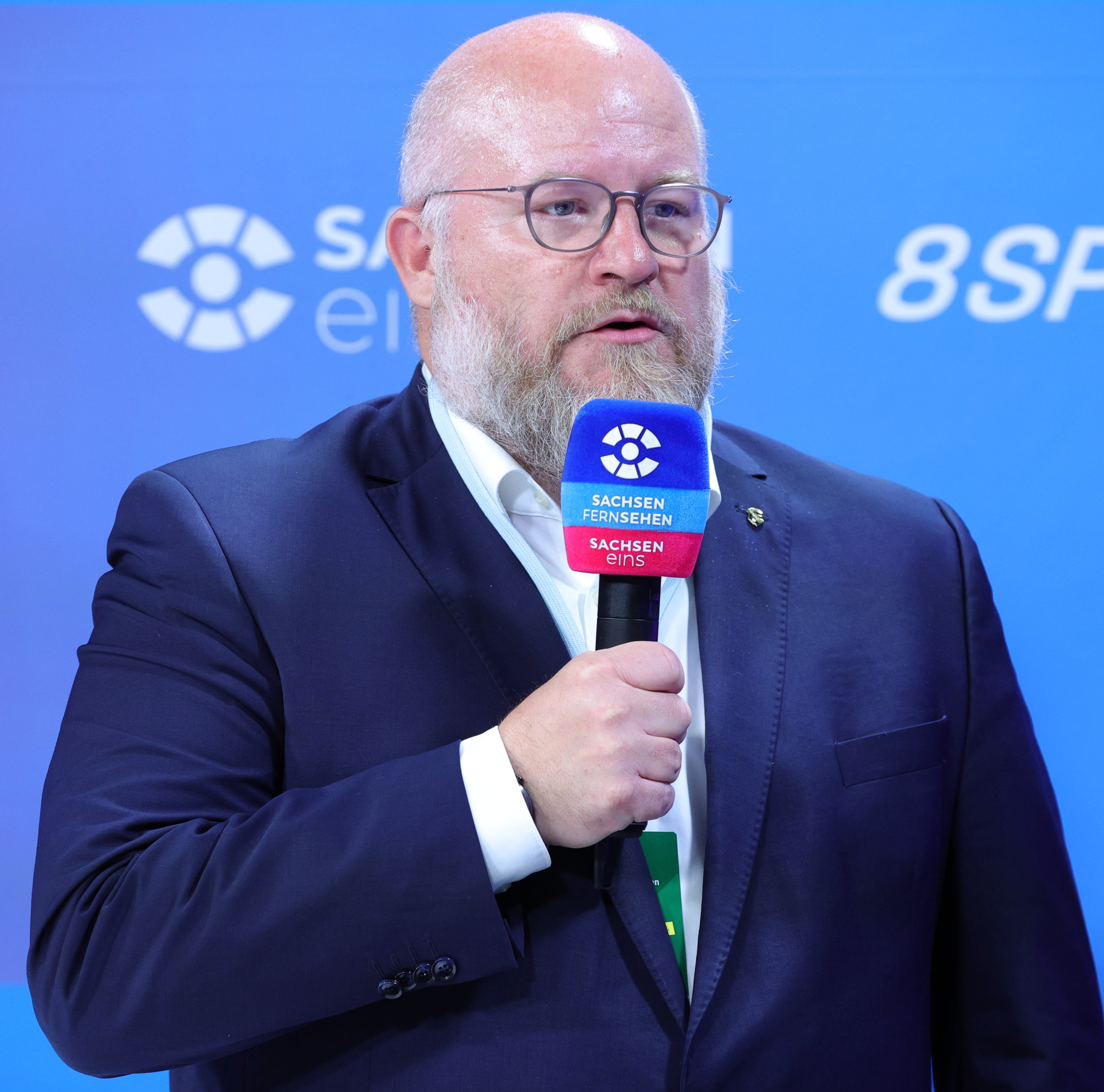
- Nowak in 2024

Member of the Landtag of Saxony
- Incumbent
- Assumed office 29 September 2014
- Preceded by: Dietmar Pellmann
- Constituency: Leipzig 3 (2014–2024); Leipzig 5 (2024–present)

Personal details
- Born: 12 April 1975 (age 51) Dresden
- Party: Christian Democratic Union (since 1989)
- Parent: Wolfgang Nowak (father)

Andreas Nowak (born 12 April 1975 in Dresden) is a German politician serving as a member of the Landtag of Saxony since 2014. He has served as chairman of the Christian Democratic Union in Leipzig since 2021.
