= 2009 Saxony state election =

State election in Saxony, Germany

- 30 August 2009

All 132 seats of the Landtag of Saxony 67 seats needed for a majority
- Turnout: 1,797,349 (52.2%) ▼7.4 pp
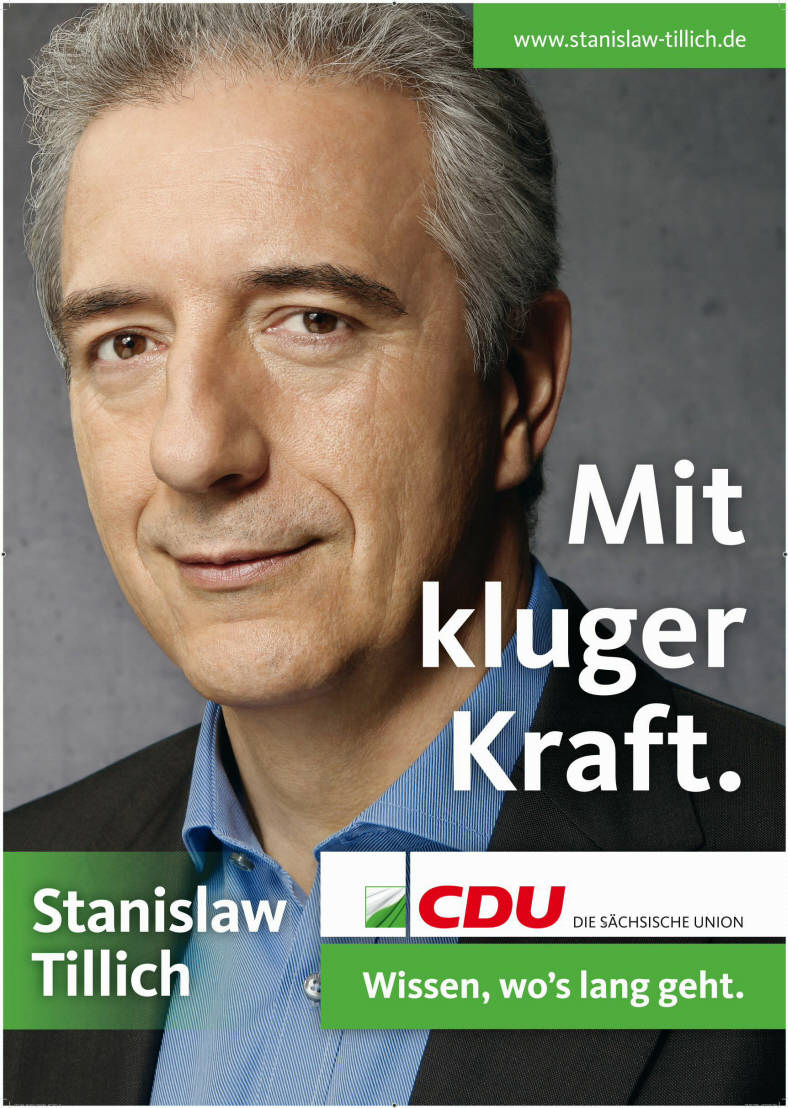

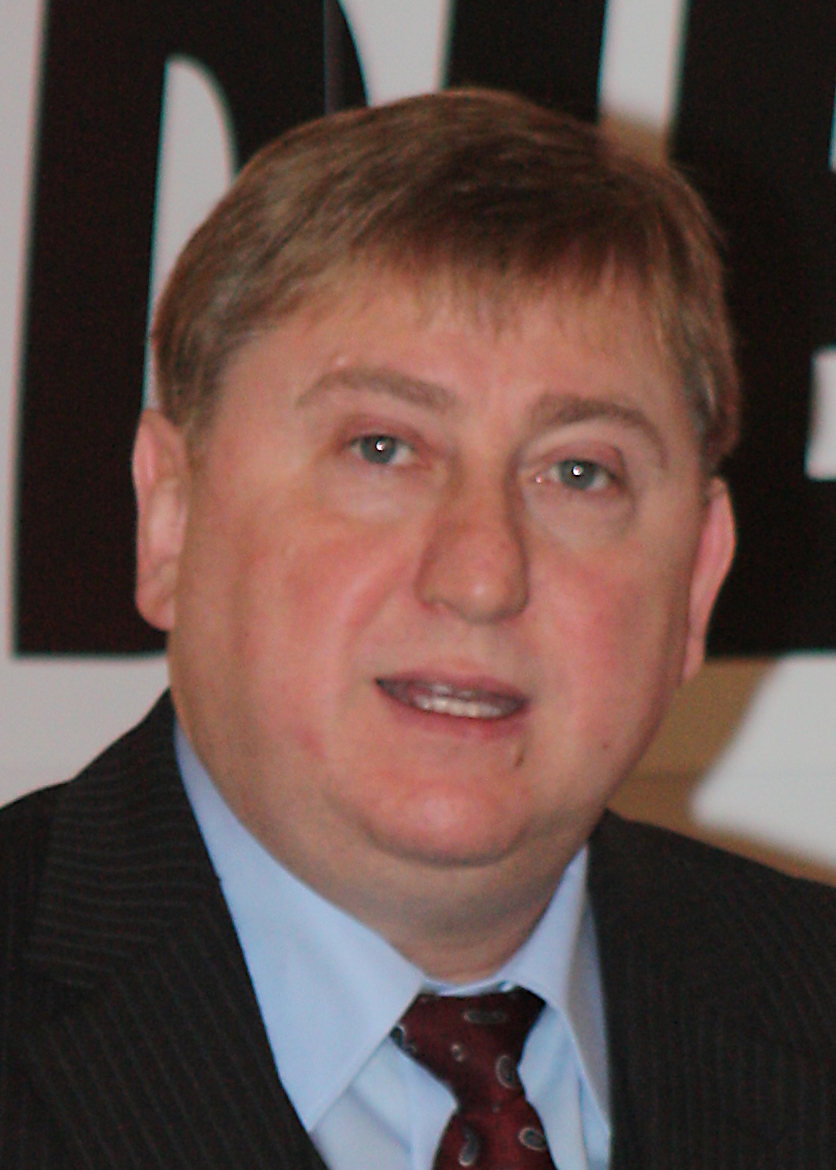

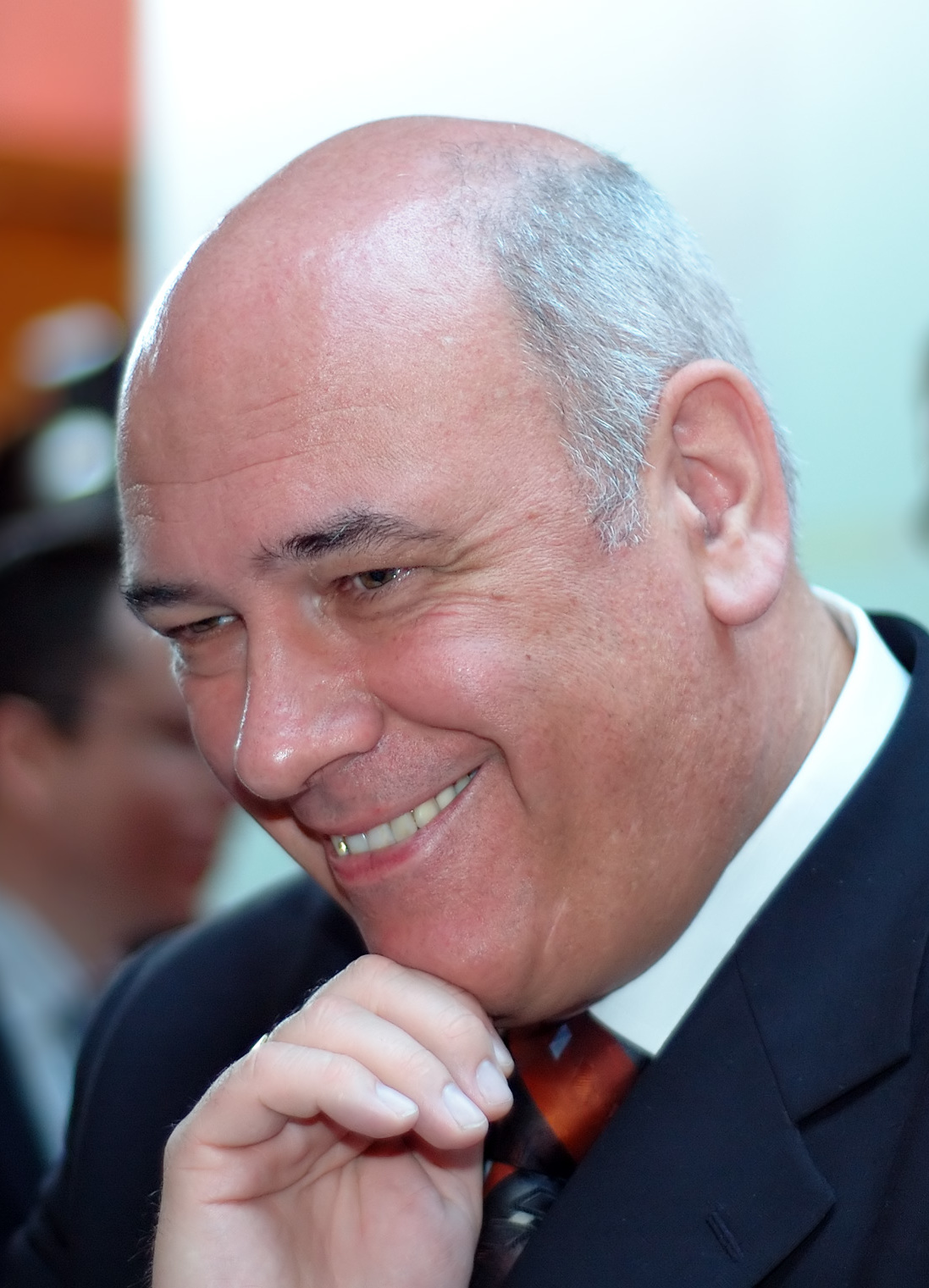

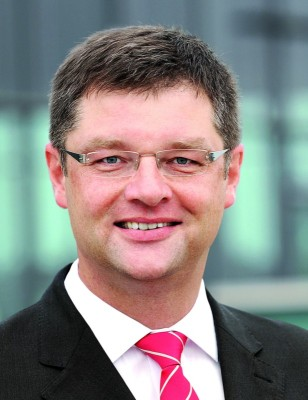

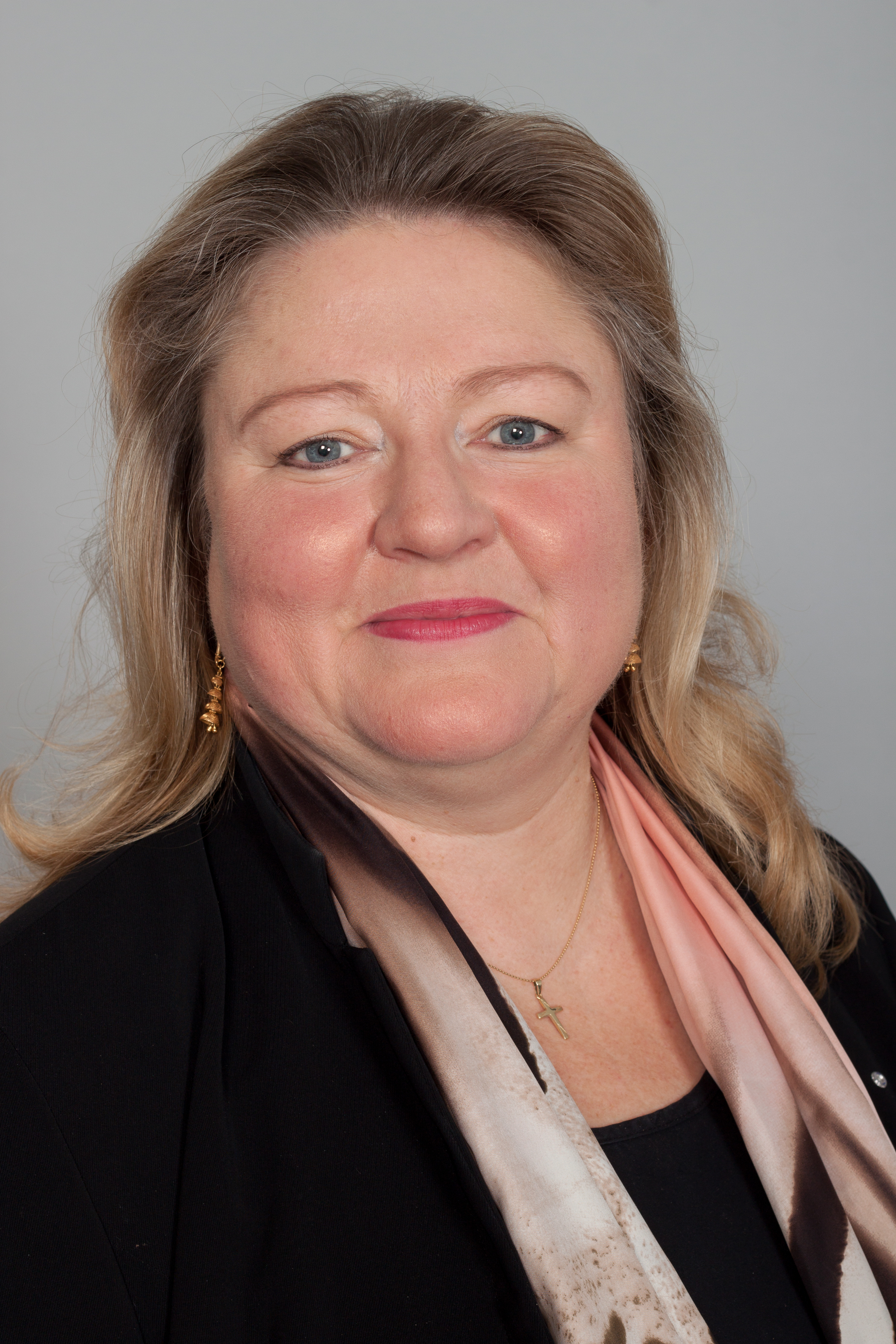

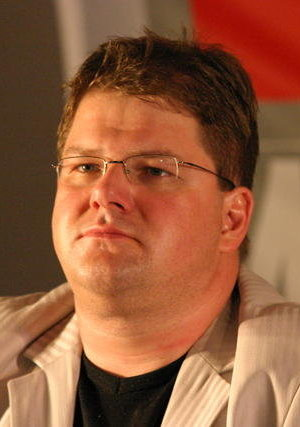
	First party	Second party	Third party
Leader	Stanislaw Tillich	André Hahn	Thomas Jurk
Party	CDU	Left	SPD
Last election	55 seats, 41.1%	31 seats, 23.6% (Note: Results for PDS.)	13 seats, 9.8%
Seats won	58	29	14
Seat change	▲3	▼2	▲1
Popular vote	722,983	370,359	187,261
Percentage	40.2%	20.6%	10.4%
Swing	▼0.9 pp	▼3.0 pp	▲0.6 pp
	Fourth party	Fifth party	Sixth party
Leader	Holger Zastrow	Antje Hermenau	Holger Apfel
Party	FDP	Greens	NPD
Last election	7 seats, 5.9%	6 seats, 5.1%	12 seats, 9.2%
Seats won	14	9	8
Seat change	▲7	▲3	▼4
Popular vote	178,867	114,963	100,834
Percentage	10.0%	6.4%	5.6%
Swing	▲4.1 pp	▲1.3 pp	▼3.6 pp
- Results for the single-member constituencies
Minister-President before election
Stanislaw Tillich
CDU
Elected Minister-President
Stanislaw Tillich
CDU

The 2009 Saxony state election was held on 30 August 2009 to elect the members of the 5th Landtag of Saxony. The incumbent grand coalition of the Christian Democratic Union (CDU) and Social Democratic Party (SPD) led by Minister-President Stanislaw Tillich retained its majority. However, the CDU chose to discontinue the coalition in favour of forming government with the Free Democratic Party (FDP). Tillich was subsequently re-elected as Minister-President.

== Parties ==
The table below lists parties represented in the 4th Landtag of Saxony.

Name		Ideology	Leader(s)	2004 result	
Name		Ideology	Leader(s)	Votes (%)	Seats
CDU	Christian Democratic Union of Germany; Christlich Demokratische Union Deutschlands	Christian democracy	Stanislaw Tillich	41.1%	55 / 124
Linke	The Left; Die Linke	Democratic socialism	André Hahn	23.6% (Note: Results for PDS.)	31 / 124
SPD	Social Democratic Party of Germany; Sozialdemokratische Partei Deutschlands	Social democracy	Thomas Jurk	9.8%	13 / 124
NPD	National Democratic Party; Nationaldemokratische Partei Deutschlands	Neo-Nazism	Holger Apfel	9.2%	12 / 124
FDP	Free Democratic Party; Freie Demokratische Partei	Classical liberalism	Holger Zastrow	5.9%	7 / 124
Grüne	Alliance 90/The Greens; Bündnis 90/Die Grünen	Green politics	Antje Hermenau	5.1%	6 / 124

== Opinion polling ==
Polling firm	Fieldwork date	Sample size	CDU	Linke	SPD	NPD	FDP	Grüne	Others	Lead
2009 state election	30 Aug 2009	–	40.2	20.6	10.4	5.6	10.0	6.4	6.8	19.6
Infratest dimap	18–20 Aug 2009	1,000	38	21	13	4.5	11.5	6	6	17
Forschungsgruppe Wahlen	17–20 Aug 2009	1,000	42	20	11	6	11	6	4	22
IfM Leipzig	10–17 Aug 2009	1,000	41	20	14	5	10	6	4	21
Infratest dimap	7–11 Aug 2009	1,000	39	19	12	5	12	6	4	20
IfM Leipzig	6–9 Jul 2009	1,000	42	17	14	5	11	7	5	25
Infratest dimap	19–23 Jun 2009	1,000	40	20	13	5	12	6	4	20
Infratest dimap	8–12 May 2009	1,000	40	19	15	5	10	7	4	21
dimap	20–29 Apr 2009	2,004	42	18	13	5	11	6	5	24
IfM Leipzig	6–8 Apr 2009	1,000	43	17	18	4	9	6	3	25
IfM Leipzig	10–12 Mar 2009	1,007	42	17	18	5	9	6	3	24
approxima	6 Jan–13 Feb 2009	1,011	49	21	15	4	5	5	1	28
dimap	31 Oct–10 Nov 2008	2,000	42	20	18	3	9	6	2	22
IfM Leipzig	10–12 Nov 2008	1,003	39	19	16	6	9	6	5	20
approxima	28 Jun–22 Aug 2008	1,011	42.0	21.0	19.5	2.8	6.8	7.0	0.9	21.0
Infratest dimap	22–26 May 2008	1,000	35	29	16	3	9	4	4	6
IfM Leipzig	9–14 May 2008	1,003	44	20	20	5	5	5	1	24
Emnid	25 Feb–8 Mar 2008	1,000	40	23	16	4	7	5	?	17
Emnid	13–27 Feb 2008	~500	41	22	16	4	7	5	?	19
Emnid	18–19 Jan 2008	750	41	21	15	5	7	5	6	20
approxima	1 Sep–7 Oct 2007	1,016	40	20	20	4	7	7	2	20
dimap	6–16 Nov 2007	996	39	22	16	5	8	6	4	17
Infratest dimap	10–11 Sep 2007	1,000	40	25	12	6	7	5	5	15
Forsa	20 Aug–4 Sep 2007	1,130	39	27	8	9	7	5	5	12
IfM Leipzig	20–22 Aug 2007	1,008	38	28	11	6	7	5	5	10
IfM Leipzig	15–18 Aug 2007	800	37	29	10	–	6	6	12	8
IfM Leipzig	13–14 Jul 2007	1,012	40	24	15	6	7	6	2	16
Forsa	12 Jul 2007	?	41	26	8	8	6	6	5	15
IfM Leipzig	March 2007	>1,000	41	21	18	5	6	6	3	20
IfM Leipzig	18–20 Dec 2006	805	42	23	13	–	7	5	10	19
dimap	28 Oct–8 Nov 2006	2,007	37	22	14	7	9	7	4	15
IfM Leipzig	21–22 Aug 2006	803	45	23	13	–	9	5	5	22
Emnid	29 May–24 Jun 2006	1,056	43	25	11	6	7	4	4	18
Emnid	9–13 Jan 2006	1,000	47	22	12	5	5	5	4	25
IfM Leipzig	19–20 Dec 2005	835	43	25	15	4	6	5	2	18
Emnid	16–24 Aug 2005	1,003	42	28	13	5	5	4	3	14
IfM Leipzig	12–19 May 2005	1,018	45	22	12	4	7	6	4	23
Emnid	3–31 Jan 2005	1,053	42	22	12	9	5	4	6	20
2004 state election	19 Sep 2004	–	41.1	23.6	9.8	9.2	5.9	5.1	5.3	17.5

== Election result ==
Summary of the 30 August 2009 election results for the Landtag of Saxony
Party	Votes	%	+/-	Seats	+/-	Seats %
Christian Democratic Union (CDU)	722,983	40.2	▼0.9	58	▲3	43.9
The Left (Linke)	370,359	20.6	▼3.0 (Note: Compared to results for PDS.)	29	▼2 (Note: Compared to results for PDS.)	22.0
Social Democratic Party (SPD)	187,261	10.4	▲0.6	14	▲1	10.6
Free Democratic Party (FDP)	178,867	10.0	▲4.1	14	▲7	10.6
Alliance 90/The Greens (Grüne)	114,963	6.4	▲1.3	9	▲3	6.8
National Democratic Party (NPD)	100,834	5.6	▼3.6	8	▼4	6.1
Human Environment Animal Protection Party (Tierschutz)	36,932	2.1	▲0.5	0	±0	0
Pirate Party Germany (Piraten)	34,651	1.9	New	0	New	0
Free Saxony	24,287	1.4	▲1.4	0	±0	0
Others	26,212	1.5		0	±0	0
Total	1,797,349	100.0		132	▲8	
Voter turnout		52.2	▼7.4			

Popular Vote
CDU	40.22%
DIE LINKE	20.61%
SPD	10.42%
FDP	9.95%
B'90/GRÜNE	6.40%
NPD	5.61%
Other	6.79%

Landtag seats
CDU	43.94%
DIE LINKE	21.97%
SPD	10.61%
FDP	10.61%
B'90/GRÜNE	6.82%
NPD	6.06%
