= Christin Melcher =

German politician (born 1983)

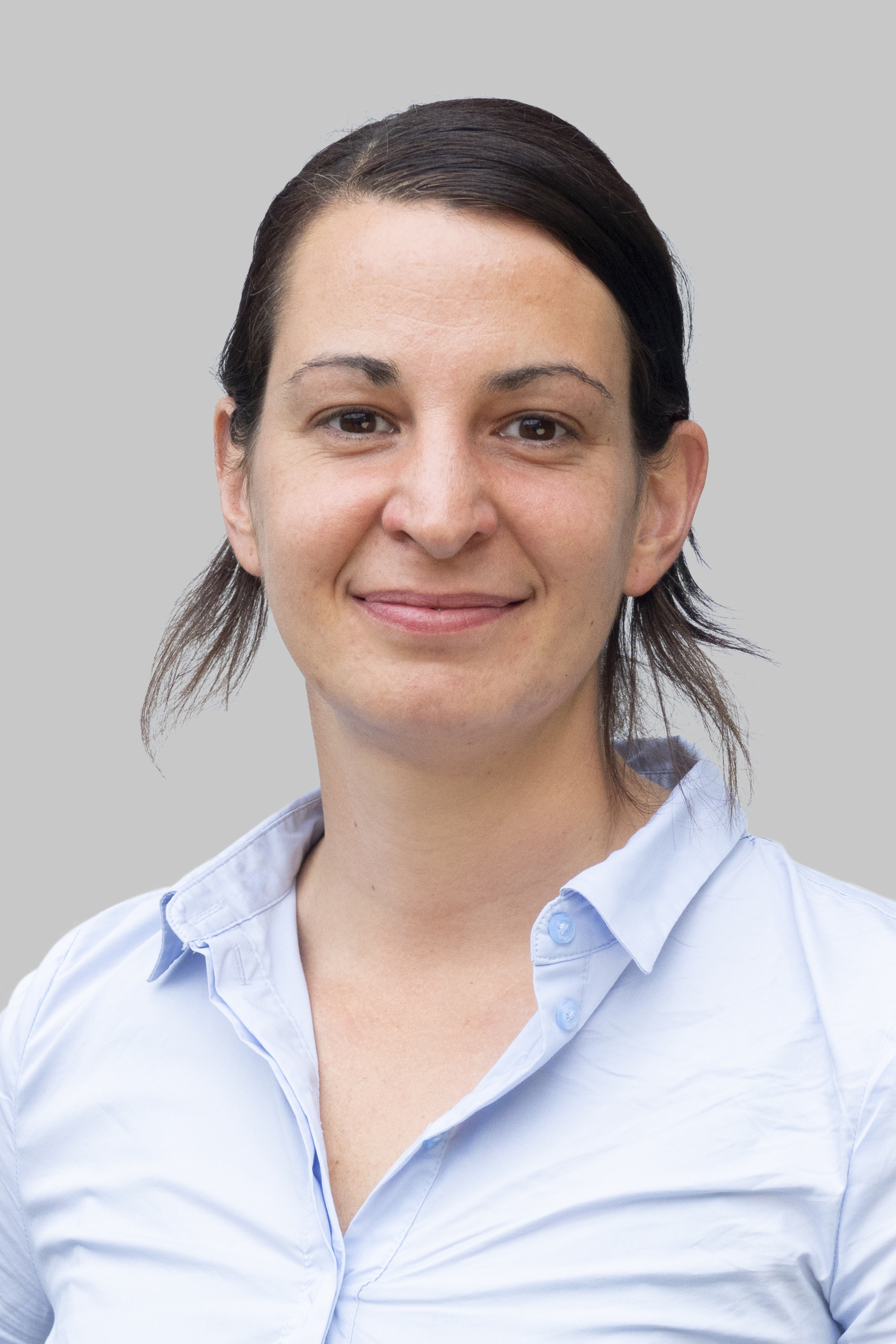
- Melcher in 2019

Member of the Landtag of Saxony
- Incumbent
- Assumed office 1 October 2019
- Preceded by: Christine Clauß
- Constituency: Leipzig 5 (2019–2024)

Personal details
- Born: 26 April 1983 (age 42) Wolgast
- Party: Alliance 90/The Greens

Christin Melcher (born 26 April 1983 in Wolgast) is a German politician serving as a member of the Landtag of Saxony since 2019. From 2016 to 2020, she served as spokesperson of Alliance 90/The Greens in Saxony.
