= Franziska Schubert =

German politician (born 1982)

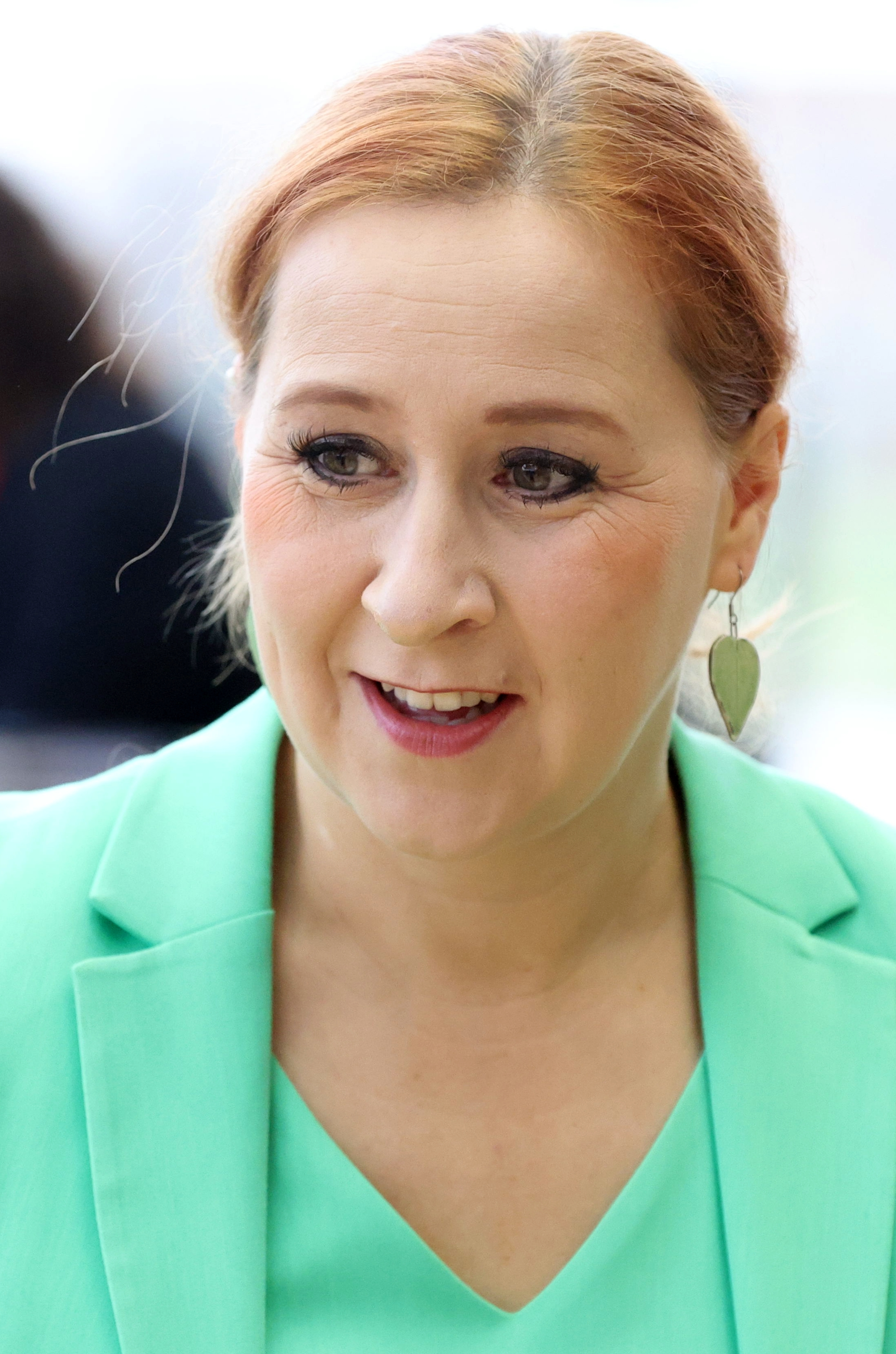
- Schubert in 2024

Member of the Landtag of Saxony
- Incumbent
- Assumed office 29 September 2014

Personal details
- Born: 3 May 1982 (age 44)
- Party: Alliance 90/The Greens

Franziska Schubert (born 3 May 1982) is a German politician serving as a member of the Landtag of Saxony since 2014. She has served as group leader of Alliance 90/The Greens since 2020.
