= Valentin Lippmann =

German politician (born 1991)

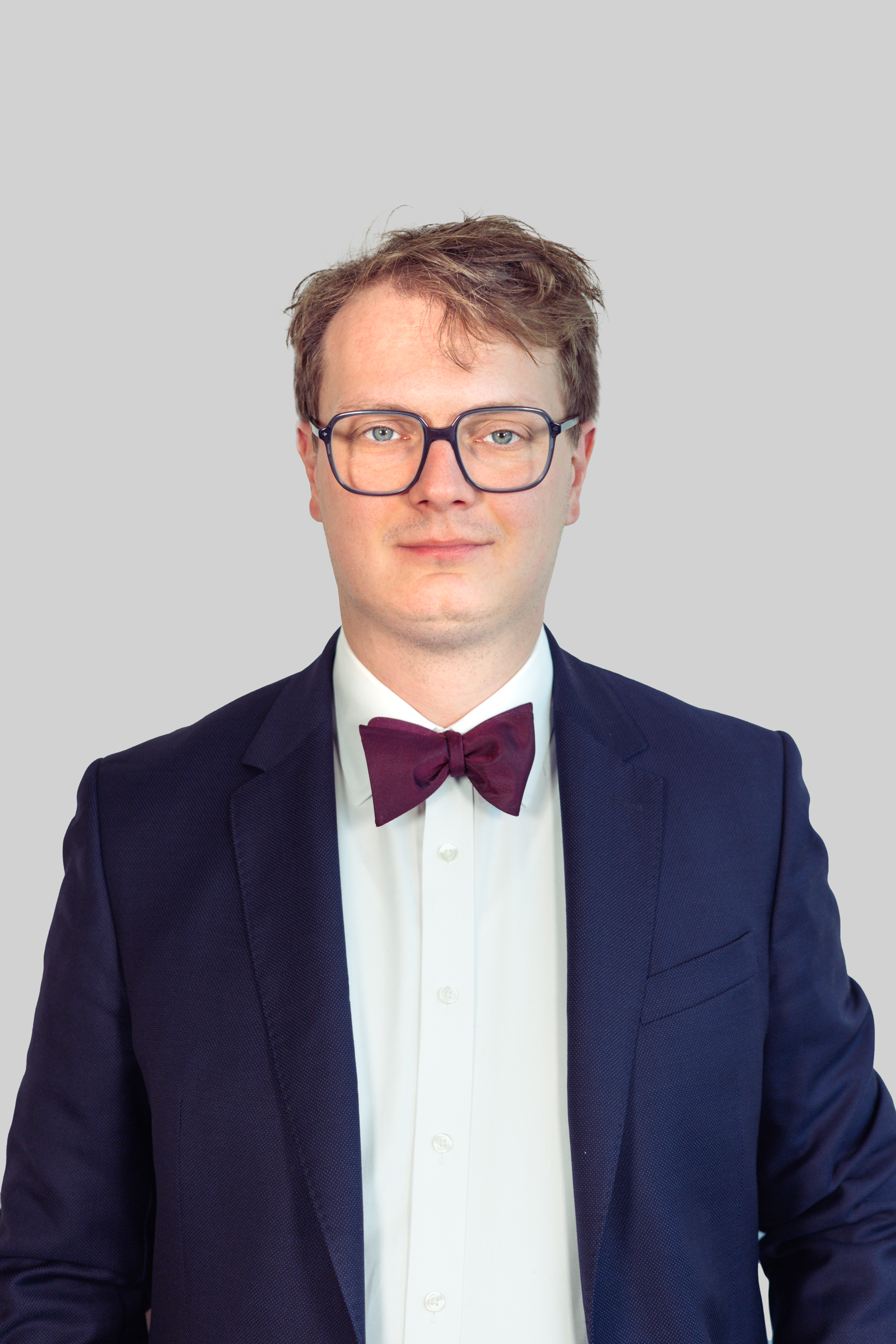
- Lippmann in 2024

Member of the Landtag of Saxony
- Incumbent
- Assumed office 29 September 2014

Personal details
- Born: 22 January 1991 (age 35) Dresden
- Party: Alliance 90/The Greens (since 2006)

Valentin Lippmann (born 22 January 1991 in Dresden) is a German politician serving as a member of the Landtag of Saxony since 2014. He has served as chief whip of Alliance 90/The Greens since 2014.
