= 2014 Saxony state election =

State election in Saxony, Germany

- 31 August 2014

All 126 seats of the Landtag of Saxony 64 seats needed for a majority
- Turnout: 1,637,499 (49.1%) ▼3.1 pp
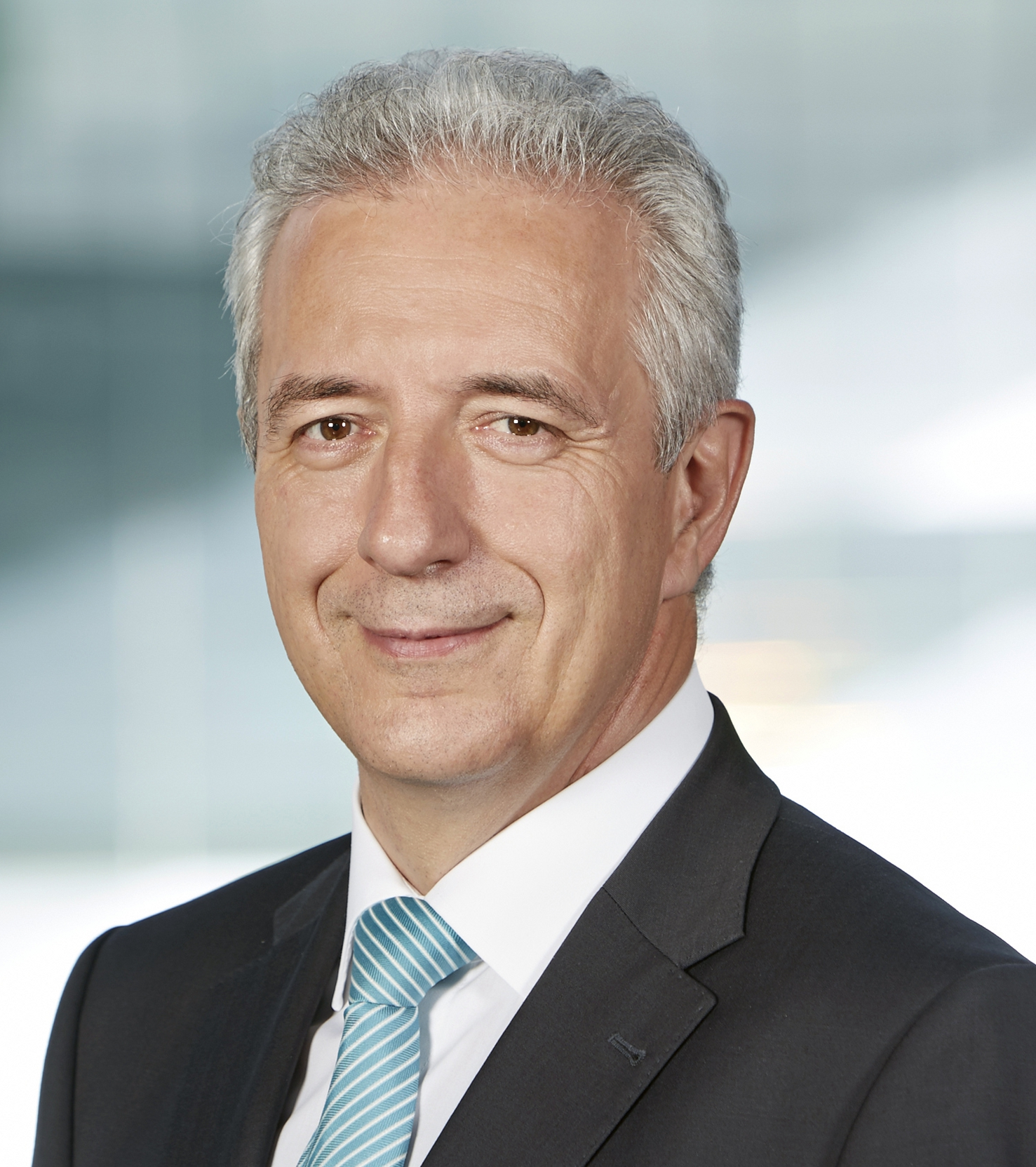

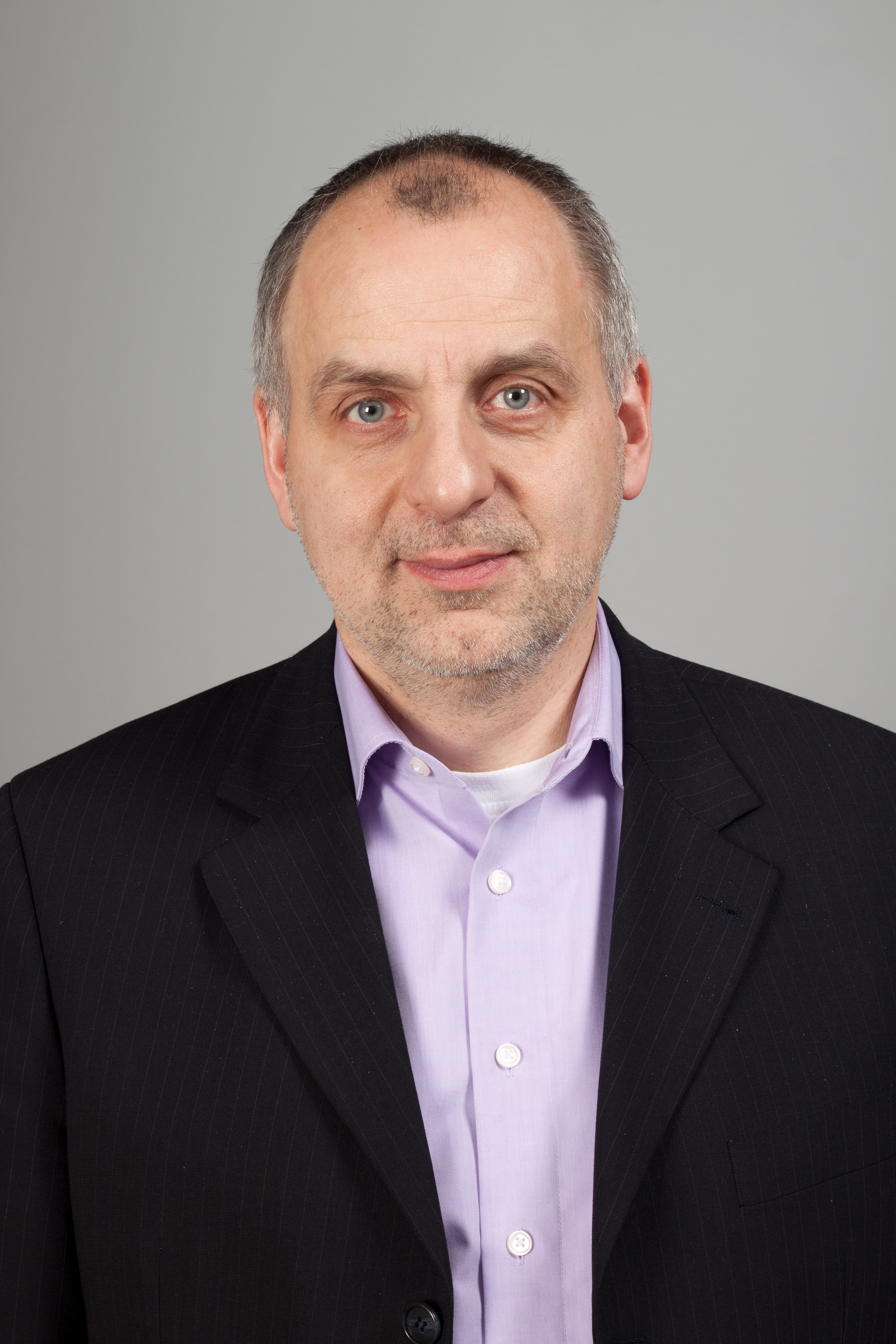

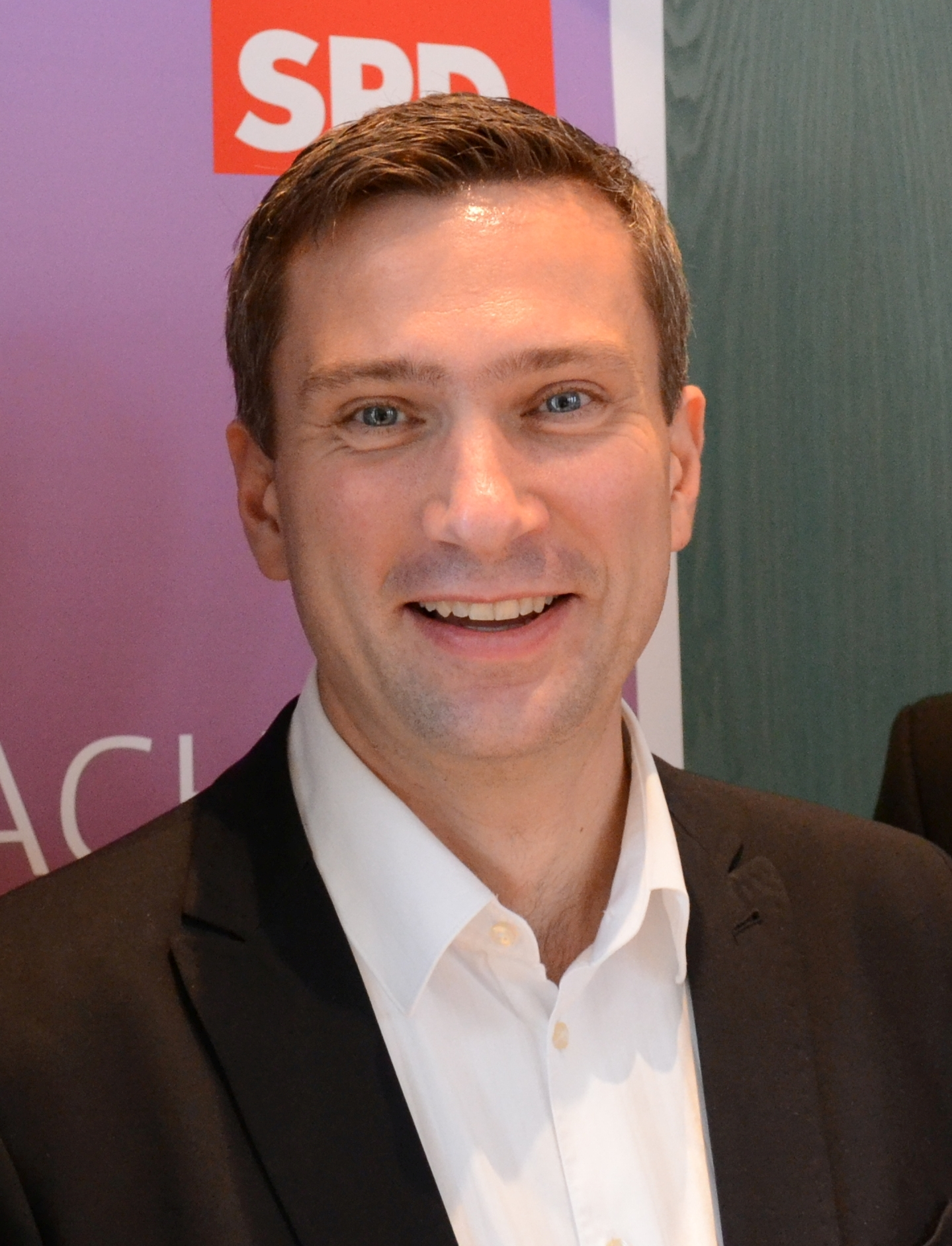

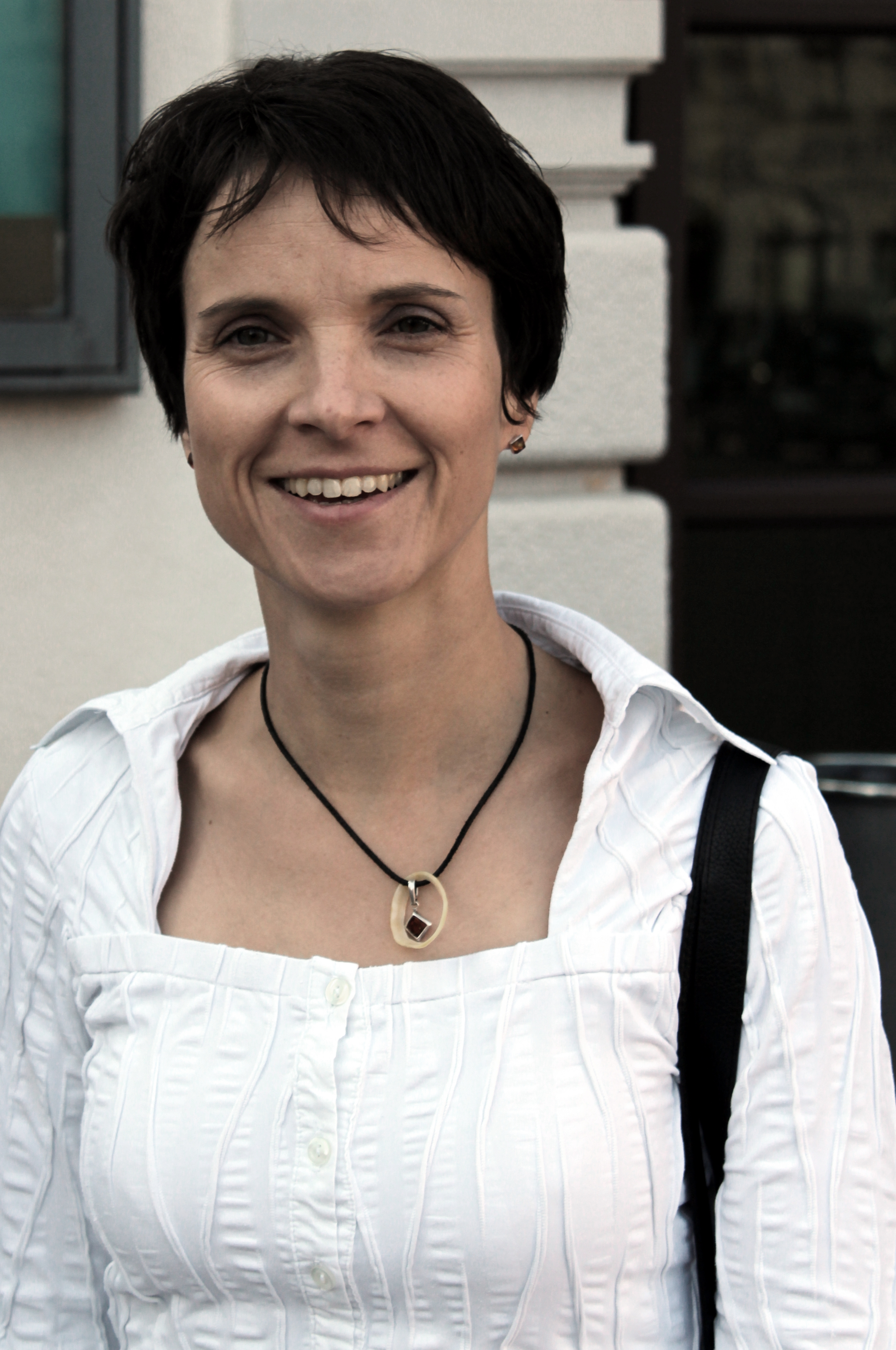

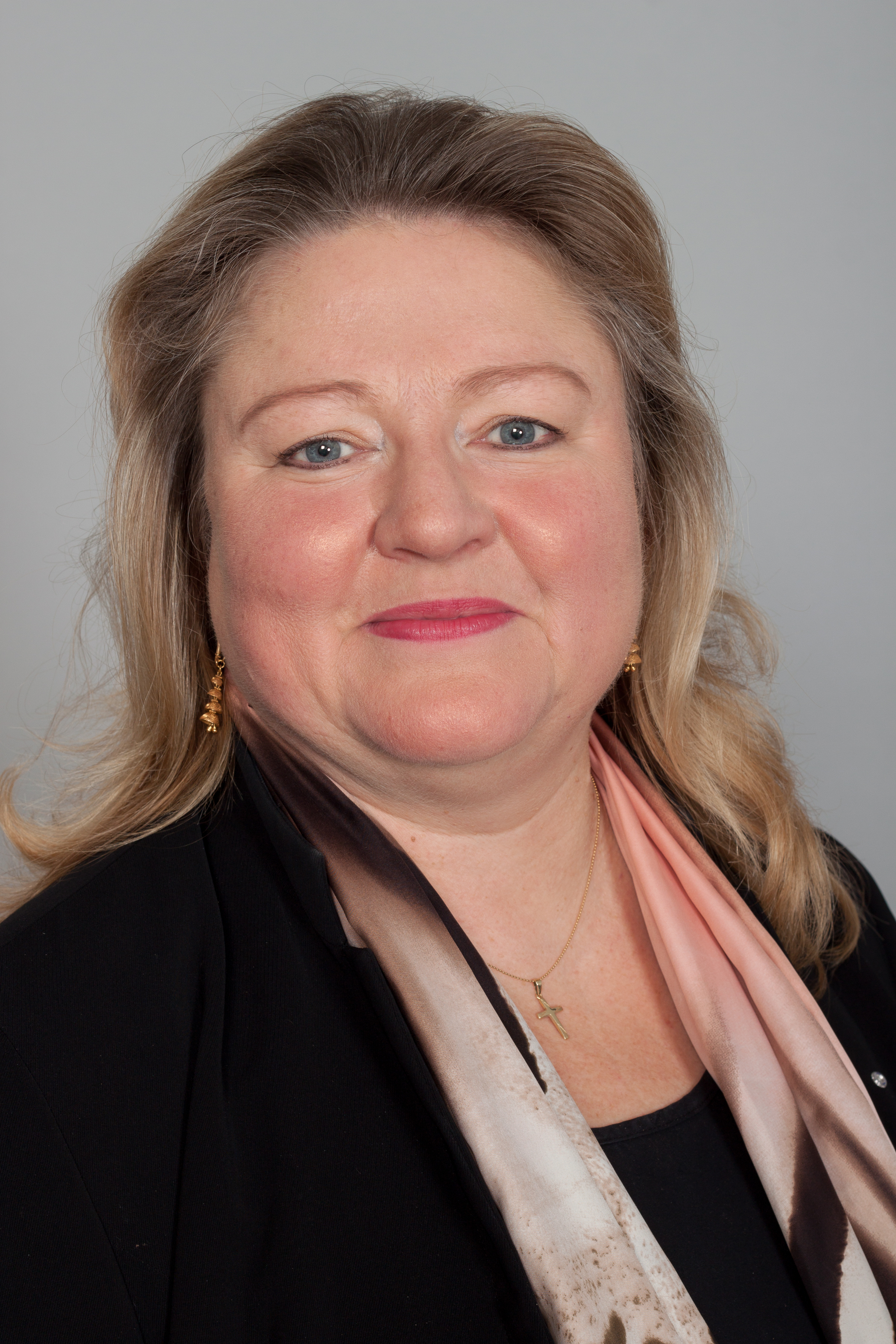

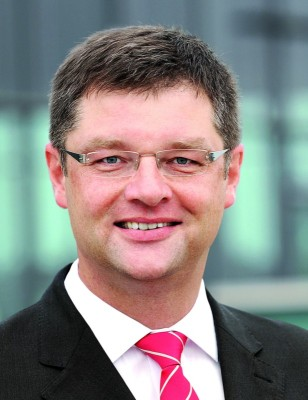
	First party	Second party	Third party
Leader	Stanislaw Tillich	Rico Gebhardt	Martin Dulig
Party	CDU	Left	SPD
Last election	58 seats, 40.2%	29 seats, 20.6%	14 seats, 10.4%
Seats won	59	27	18
Seat change	▲1	▼2	▲4
Popular vote	645,414	309,581	202,396
Percentage	39.4%	18.9%	12.4%
Swing	▼0.8 pp	▼1.7 pp	▲2.0 pp
	Fourth party	Fifth party	Sixth party
Leader	Frauke Petry	Antje Hermenau; Volkmar Zschocke	Holger Szymanski
Party	AfD	Greens	NPD
Last election	Did not exist	9 seats, 6.4%	8 seats, 5.6%
Seats won	14	8	0
Seat change	▲14	▼1	▼8
Popular vote	159,611	93,857	81,051
Percentage	9.7%	5.7%	4.9%
Swing	New party	▼0.7 pp	▼0.7 pp
	Seventh party
Leader	Holger Zastrow
Party	FDP
Last election	14 seats, 10.0%
Seats won	0
Seat change	▼14
Popular vote	61,840
Percentage	3.8%
Swing	▼6.2 pp
- Results for the single-member constituencies
Government before election
Tillich II
CDU–FDP
Government after election
Tillich III
CDU–SPD

The 2014 Saxony state election was held on 31 August 2014 to elect the members of the 6th Landtag of Saxony. The incumbent coalition government of the Christian Democratic Union (CDU) and Free Democratic Party (FDP) led by Minister-President Stanislaw Tillich was defeated as the FDP lost all its seats. The CDU subsequently formed a grand coalition with the Social Democratic Party (SPD), and Tillich was re-elected as Minister-President.

== Background ==
After the 2009 state election, held a month before the 2009 federal election, the CDU–SPD grand coalition left office and was replaced by a CDU-led coalition with the FDP. The FDP suffered a major decline in support nationally after 2009, culminating in their ejection from the Bundestag in the 2013 federal election. Thus, in the lead-up to the 2014 state election, the Saxony state government was the only government nationwide that included the FDP. It seemed unlikely this coalition could continue after the election, as polling indicated the FDP may not even pass the 5% threshold to enter the Landtag.

The largest opposition party was The Left. Polling indicated that a coalition between The Left, the SPD and The Greens may have been able to secure a majority, but this option was rejected by both the SPD and the Greens prior to the election.

For the SPD, the state election in Saxony was their second electoral test (after the European elections) since becoming the junior partner in the federal grand coalition. Polls suggested that the public viewed the SPD's role in government as positive; issues that had been worked on by the government were primarily election promises of the SPD. Despite this, all polls showed that the SPD was headed for another third-place finish in the state election. The SPD's election campaign was centred on their lead candidate, Martin Dulig, who involved his family in the campaign. Dulig was also supported by former federal Chancellor Gerhard Schröder.

The Alternative for Germany (AfD) was hoping to win seats in a state parliament for the first time. In both the 2013 federal election and the 2014 European elections, AfD had achieved its strongest results in Saxony (6.8% in the federal election and 10.1% in the European elections).

The National Democratic Party (NPD) had won seats in Saxony in 2004 and retained them, with losses, in 2009. Polling and election results for the NPD had trended downwards since then, with most polls suggesting the party would not cross the 5% threshold and would thus lose their representation.

The Pirate Party won 1.9% of the vote in the previous state election. Despite polling in late 2011 and 2012 showing its support up to as much as 9% in Saxony, the party lost most of its popularity throughout 2013, and the party had averaged around 2% in Saxony since the end of the year.

=== Pre-election coalition talks ===
Polls suggested that the CDU would again be the largest party. Minister-President Tillich was therefore expected to lead coalition negotiations. In addition to the SPD, the Greens hoped for a coalition with the CDU, but a "black-green" coalition was considered unlikely because the Greens oppose coal mining in Saxony.

Prior to the election, Tillich was open to coalitions with the FDP, the SPD, the Greens or AfD. Carsten Linnemann, the chairman of the CDU/CSU Business Association, stated that a coalition with the Greens was a viable alternative if the FDP did not obtain any seats. Tillich did not rule out a coalition with AfD, though CDU general-secretary Peter Tauber spoke out against the possibility.

The Left was unlikely to overtake the CDU, according to polls. The party wanted to form a coalition with the SPD in particular. The SPD, however, were sceptical about such an arrangement.

The NPD was not considered in coalition discussions.

== Parties ==
The table below lists parties represented in the 5th Landtag of Saxony.

Name		Ideology	Leader(s)	2009 result	
Name		Ideology	Leader(s)	Votes (%)	Seats
CDU	Christian Democratic Union of Germany; Christlich Demokratische Union Deutschlands	Christian democracy	Stanislaw Tillich	40.2%	58 / 132
Linke	The Left; Die Linke	Democratic socialism	Rico Gebhardt	20.6%	29 / 132
SPD	Social Democratic Party of Germany; Sozialdemokratische Partei Deutschlands	Social democracy	Martin Dulig	10.4%	14 / 132
FDP	Free Democratic Party; Freie Demokratische Partei	Classical liberalism	Holger Zastrow	10.0%	14 / 132
Grüne	Alliance 90/The Greens; Bündnis 90/Die Grünen	Green politics	Antje Hermenau; Volkmar Zschocke	6.4%	9 / 132
NPD	National Democratic Party; Nationaldemokratische Partei Deutschlands	Neo-Nazism	Holger Szymanski	5.6%	8 / 124

== Opinion polling ==
Polling firm	Fieldwork date	Sample size	CDU	Linke	SPD	FDP	Grüne	NPD	Piraten	AfD	Others	Lead
2014 state election	31 Aug 2014	–	39.4	18.9	12.4	3.8	5.7	4.9	1.1	9.7	4.1	20.5
Forschungsgruppe Wahlen	27–28 Aug 2014	1,013	40.5	19	15	3	5.5	5	–	7	5	21.5
Infratest dimap	19–21 Aug 2014	1,002	40	19	14	3.5	6.5	5	–	7	5	21
Forschungsgruppe Wahlen	18–20 Aug 2014	1,072	39	20	15	3	6	5	–	7	5	19
uniQma	6–10 Aug 2014	800	42	18	13	3	6	4	1	6	7	24
IM Field	Aug 2014	1,003	43	20	14	3	7	3	–	5	5	23
INSA	23 Jul–1 Aug 2014	500	40	19	14	5	6	4	–	6	6	21
Infratest dimap	3–7 Jul 2014	1,000	42	21	13	4	7	3	–	7	3	21
Forsa	15 May–10 Jun 2014	1,002	42	18	15	3	6	3	–	8	5	24
uniQma	2–6 Jun 2014	800	45	16	13	3	6	3	2	7	5	29
Infratest dimap	24–28 Apr 2014	1,000	43	18	16	4	6	4	–	6	3	25
dimap	24 Feb–11 Mar 2014	2,001	45	17	15	4	6	4	–	6	?	28
INSA	26 Feb–3 Mar 2014	1,003	43	22	15	2	5	1	–	7	5	21
uniQma	11–14 Dec 2013	800	49	15	17	2	6	1	2	6	2	32
Infratest dimap	9–15 Aug 2013	1,000	45	14	14	5	11	3	3	–	3	31
Emnid	1 Feb–6 Mar 2013	1,025	43	19	16	5	7	4	4	–	2	24
dimap	10–24 Aug 2012	2,002	44	15	16	5	8	2	4	–	6	28
Infratest	27 Jun–1 Jul 2012	1,000	41	19	16	4	7	3	7	–	3	22
Emnid	16 Jan–12 Feb 2012	1,040	43	18	14	2	10	2	9	–	1	25
IfM Leipzig	4–7 Oct 2011	1,001	44	17	12	2	11	3	8	–	?	27
dimap	4–17 Jul 2011	2,003	43	19	12	6	11	5	–	–	4	24
aproxima	4 Apr–29 May 2011	1,000	42	21	15	6	8	3	–	–	3	21
aproxima	9 Apr–9 Jul 2010	1,000	42	23	16	5	7	4	–	–	3	19
IfM Leipzig	9–10 Jun 2010	802	40	20	16	6	12	3	–	–	3	20
2009 state election	30 Aug 2009	–	40.2	20.6	10.4	10.0	6.4	5.6	1.9	–	4.9	19.6

== Election result ==

Summary of the 31 August 2014 election results for the Landtag of Saxony
Party	Votes	%	+/-	Seats	+/-	Seats %
Christian Democratic Union (CDU)	645,515	39.4	▼0.8	59	▲1	46.8
The Left (Linke)	309,581	18.9	▼1.7	27	▼2	21.4
Social Democratic Party (SPD)	202,396	12.4	▲2.0	18	▲4	14.3
Alternative for Germany (AfD)	159,611	9.7	New	14	New	11.1
Alliance 90/The Greens (Grüne)	93,857	5.7	▼0.7	8	▼1	6.4
National Democratic Party (NPD)	81,051	4.9	▼0.7	0	▼8	0
Free Democratic Party (FDP)	61,840	3.8	▼6.2	0	▼14	0
Free Voters (FW)	26,434	1.6	▲0.2	0	±0	0
Human Environment Animal Protection Party (Tierschutz)	18,611	1.1	▼1.0	0	±0	0
Pirate Party Germany (Piraten)	18,157	1.1	▼0.8	0	±0	0
Others	20,547	1.3		0	±0	0
Total	1,637,499	100.0		126	▼6	
Voter turnout		49.1	▼3.1			

Popular Vote
CDU	39.41%
DIE LINKE	18.91%
SPD	12.36%
AfD	9.75%
B'90/GRÜNE	5.73%
NPD	4.95%
FDP	3.78%
Other	5.11%

Landtag seats
CDU	46.83%
DIE LINKE	21.43%
SPD	14.29%
AfD	11.11%
B'90/GRÜNE	6.35%

== Government formation ==
Due to the ejection of the FDP from the Landtag, the CDU was forced to seek new coalition partners. Minister-President Tillich ruled out a coalition with AfD.

The CDU held exploratory talks with the Greens and the SPD. Talks with the Greens were inconclusive; the Greens claimed that education policy and energy policy were the sticking points. Antje Hermenau, the Greens' lead candidate, then resigned on 20 September.

Coalition talks began on 19 September between the CDU and the SPD. On 9 November 2014, the SPD announced that 82.2% of its members had voted in favour of the coalition agreement between the CDU and SPD.
