= Stephan Kühn =

German politician (born 1979)

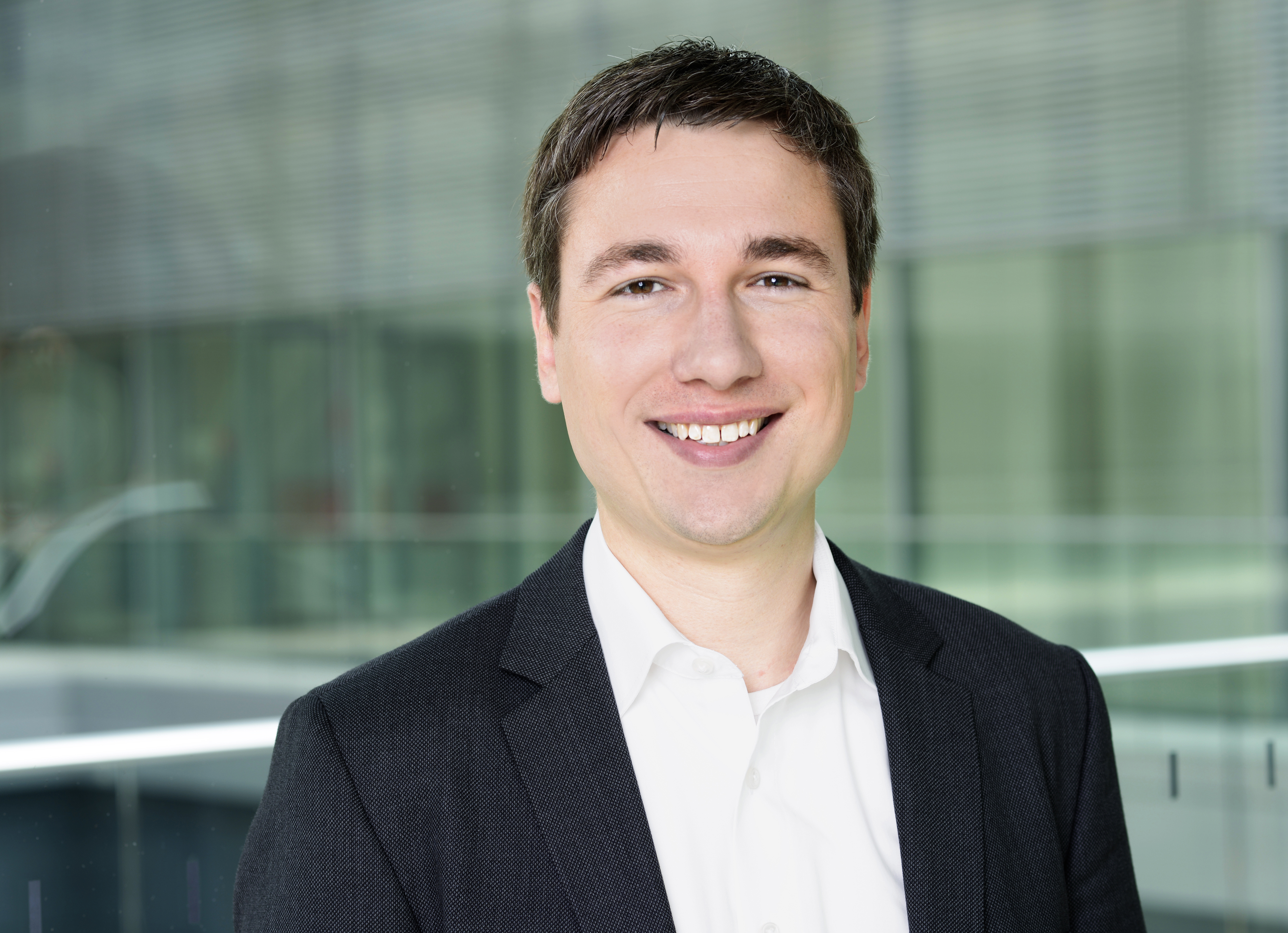
- Stephan Kühn in 2014

Member of the Bundestag
- In office 2009–2020

Personal details
- Born: 6 September 1979 (age 47) Dresden, East Germany (now Germany)
- Party: Greens
- Education: TU Dresden

Stephan Kühn (born 6 September 1979) is a German politician of Alliance 90/The Greens who served as a member of the Bundestag from the state of Saxony from 2009 until 2020. Since 2020, he has been serving as part of the city administration of Dresden.

== Early life and education ==
After graduating from the Marie Curie Gymnasium Dresden in 1998, Kühn did civilian service with the Green League in Dresden. From 1999 he studied sociology at the Technical University of Dresden. As part of his studies, he worked on the second Dresden Children's Study under Karl Lenz. He graduated in 2008.

== Career ==
Kühn subsequently worked as a press officer for the Green Party in Saxony.

Kühn became a member of the Bundestag in the 2009 German federal election. He served as a member of the Committee on Transport and Digital Infrastructure and the Committee on Petitions. He was also his parliamentary group's spokesman on transport policy.

== Other activities ==
- Dresdner Verkehrsbetriebe, Member of the Supervisory Board
