= Monika Lazar =

German politician (born 1967)

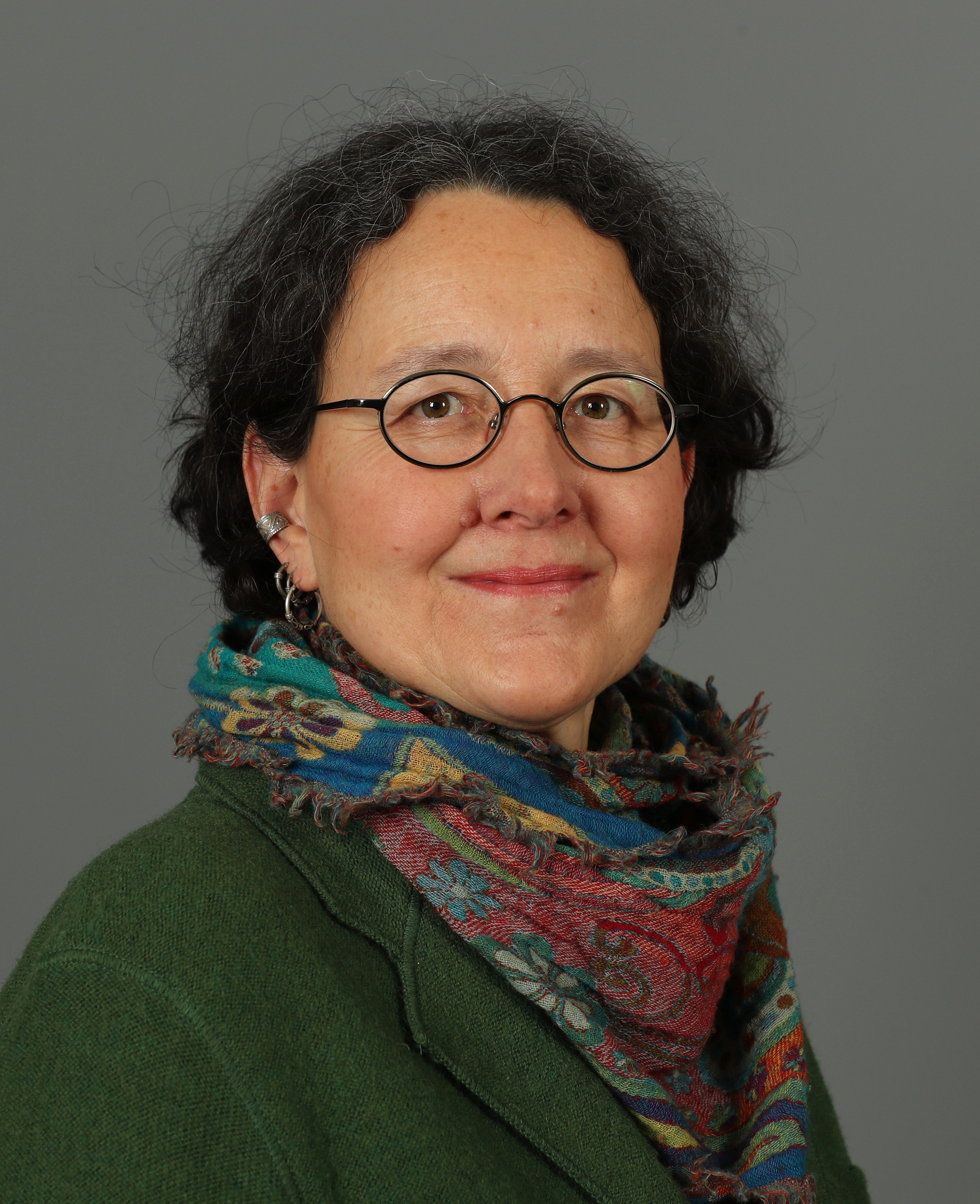
- Monika Lazar in 2020

Member of the Bundestag
- In office 2004–2021

Personal details
- Born: 13 September 1967 (age 58) Leipzig, East Germany (now Germany)
- Party: Greens

Monika Lazar (born 13 September 1967) is a German politician of the Alliance 90/The Greens served as a member of the Bundestag from the state of Saxony from 2004 until 2021.

== Early life and education ==
After graduating from the extended secondary school "Rudolf Hildebrandt" in Markkleeberg in 1986, Lazar studied the economics of domestic trade at the Leipzig Graduate School of Management until 1990.

Afterwards Lazar worked in her parents' bakery and also completed an apprenticeship as a baker from 1991 to 1993. In 1996 she began postgraduate studies in business administration, which she completed in 1998 as a business economist. Afterwards she worked for ZeitPunkt - Kulturmagazin in Leipzig until 2004.

== Political career ==
Lazar first became a member of the Bundestag in 2004, when she succeeded Antje Hermenau who had resigned her parliamentary seat. She was a member of the Sports Committee. For her parliamentary group, Lazar served as spokesperson for sports policy and for strategies against right-wing extremism.

Lazar announced that she would not stand in the 2021 federal elections but instead resign from active politics by the end of the parliamentary term.

== Other activities ==
- Federal Foundation for the Reappraisal of the SED Dictatorship, Member of the Board of Trustees (–2021)
- Federal Agency for Civic Education (BPB), Alternate Member of the Board of Trustees (2018–2021)
