= Round table (furniture) =

Meeting where everyone is equal

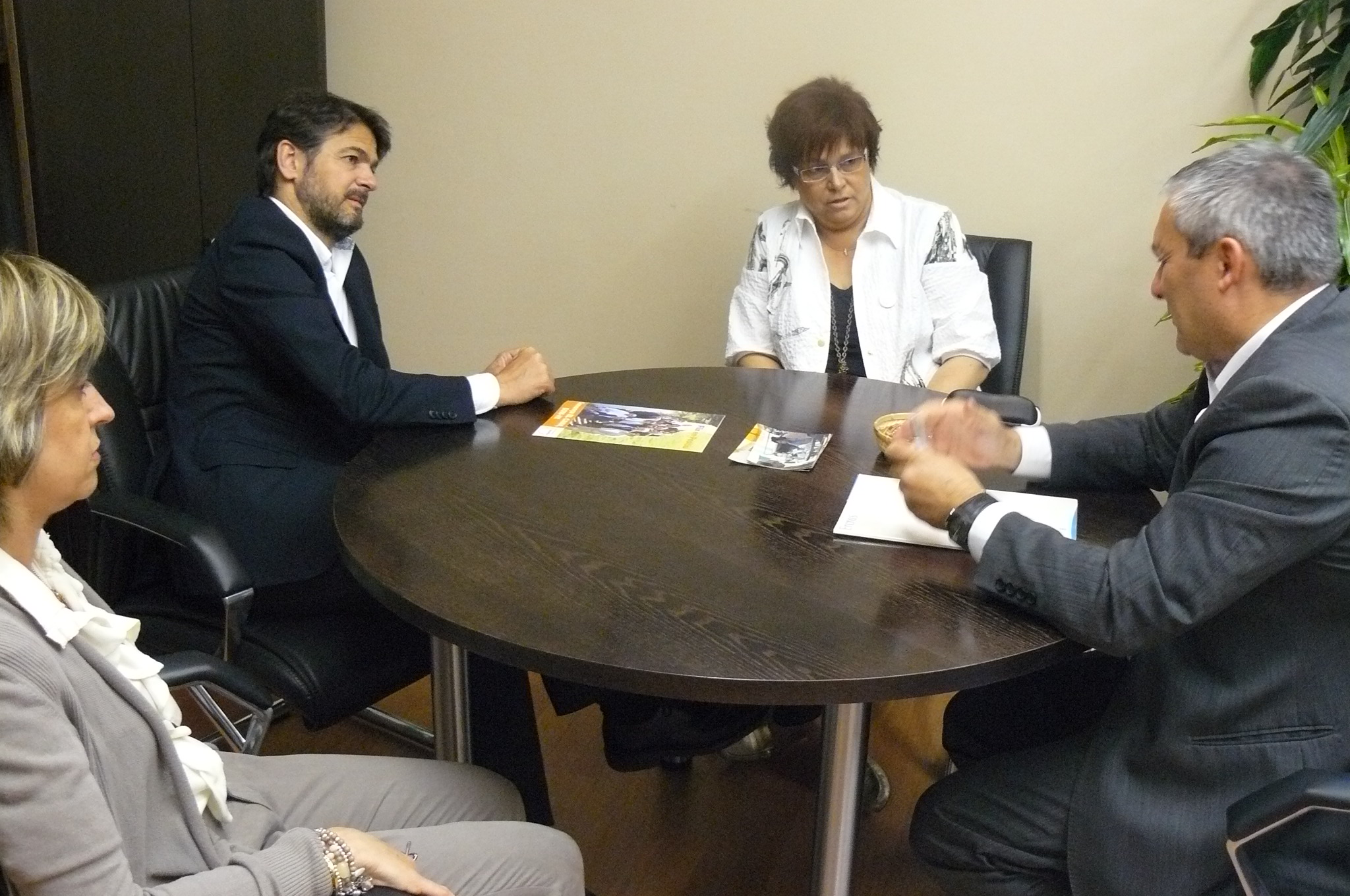
People around a round table

A round table is a table which has no "head" and no "sides", and therefore no one person sitting at it is given a privileged position and all are treated as equals. The idea stems from the Arthurian legend about the Knights of the Round Table in Camelot.

Today, round tables are often used at conferences involving many parties. The most famous modern round table was the one used for talks between the Communist government and Solidarity in Poland in 1989; see: Polish Round Table Agreement. Hence, the term "round table" is also used figuratively to refer to a peaceful way of achieving a compromise solution.

== See also ==
- Lazy Susan
