= Federal level (Germany) =

The federal level (also called the Bund or Bundesebene) is the highest level in the hierarchy of the federal state model in Germany. In political science and legal science, the model is based on the idea of a federally organized political system at the state level. Although the individual federal states have their own state government, administration and jurisdiction, their powers are derived from the federal government, which is granted competence (Kompetenz-Kompetenz). Due to their lack of external independence, the German states are not (sovereignty) states in the sense of international law, but are subdivisions of the federal state endowed with independent state sovereignty and are subject to international law.

Administrative divisions of Germany (clickable image)

== Legislative powers ==
In Germany's system of cooperative federalism, federal laws are generally passed at the federal level by the German Bundestag, which applies to the entire federal territory. However, legislation (Gesetzgebung) is limited to areas in which legislative powers have been delegated to the federal government. In the area of exclusive legislation, the states may only legislate if permitted to do so by the federal government (fundamental omnipotence) of the state as a whole. In the area of concurrent legislation, the states may act to the extent that the federal government has not done so. In the hierarchy of norms, the norms passed at the federal level in the aforementioned areas rank above those of state law (Article 31 of the Basic Law); however, fundamental rights granted by state constitutions beyond those of the Basic Law are excluded from this. In the case of legislative powers that fall within the competence of the federal government, the states participate in federal legislation via the German Bundesrat.

== Administration ==
At the federal level, the federal government is at the apex of the administration. The highest federal authorities, in addition to the ministries, are the Office of the Federal President, the Federal Court of Auditors, and several other institutions. The administration of the Bundestag and the Bundesrat are the highest federal authorities insofar as they perform official functions. The federal administration often has only a single-tiered substructure. As a rule, higher federal authorities are established directly, which are responsible for the entire federal territory. Intermediate and lower federal authorities may only be established in cases where this is provided for by law.

Permissible areas in which intermediate and subordinate authorities have been established are the Foreign Service, the Federal Finance Administration, the Federal Waterways Administration, the Federal Shipping Administration, the Federal Police and the Federal Office for the Protection of the Constitution (Article 87 of the Basic Law), the Defence Administration (Article 87b of the Basic Law), and the Air Transport Administration (Article 87d of the Basic Law). However, there are no intermediate and subordinate authorities in the latter area. Many federal administrative tasks are also performed by public law institutions and corporations.

The mixing of federal and state authorities is not permitted. The Federal Administrative Court, for example, deemed the practice of operating the Maritime Offices by the states and the Federal Maritime Office by the federal government to be inadmissible, since appeals against administrative acts of the states were decided by a federal authority. As a result, the Maritime Offices had to be established as separate institutions by the federal government in October 1986. A similar situation involving the establishment of the so-called "Job Centers" was rejected by the Federal Constitutional Court as unconstitutional due to the insufficient definition of subject-matter jurisdiction.

As of 30 June 2019, the Federal Government employs 185,170 civil servants and judges, as well as 170,575 professional and temporary soldiers. In addition, the Federal Government is the employer of 146,160 public sector employees (collective bargaining employees) who have private-law employment contracts.

== Jurisdiction ==
The federal government has, among other things, five supreme federal courts, which are at the apex of their respective specialized jurisdictions, as defined by Article 95, Paragraph 1 of the Basic Law. These are the Federal Court of Justice in Karlsruhe, which is responsible for criminal and civil matters; the Federal Administrative Court in Leipzig; the Federal Fiscal Court in Munich, which is responsible for tax and customs matters; the Federal Labour Court in Erfurt; and the Federal Social Court in Kassel, which is responsible for social jurisdiction (Sozialgerichtsbarkeit). The Federal Patent Court in Munich occupies a special position as a court specializing in intellectual property law, with the rank of a Higher Regional Court and with nationwide territorial jurisdiction.

== Federal constitutional bodies ==
The five permanent constitutional bodies are:

1. the German Bundestag (Articles 38–48 GG)
2. the German Bundesrat (Articles 50–53 GG)
3. the President of Germany (Articles 54–61 GG)
4. the Federal Government (Articles 62–69 GG)
5. the Federal Constitutional Court (Articles 92–94, 99, 100 GG)

The two non-permanent constitutional bodies, i.e. those that only meet on an ad hoc basis, are:

1. the Joint Committee (Article 53a of the Basic Law)
2. the Federal Convention (Article 54 GG)
