= Holger Zastrow =

German politician (born 1969)

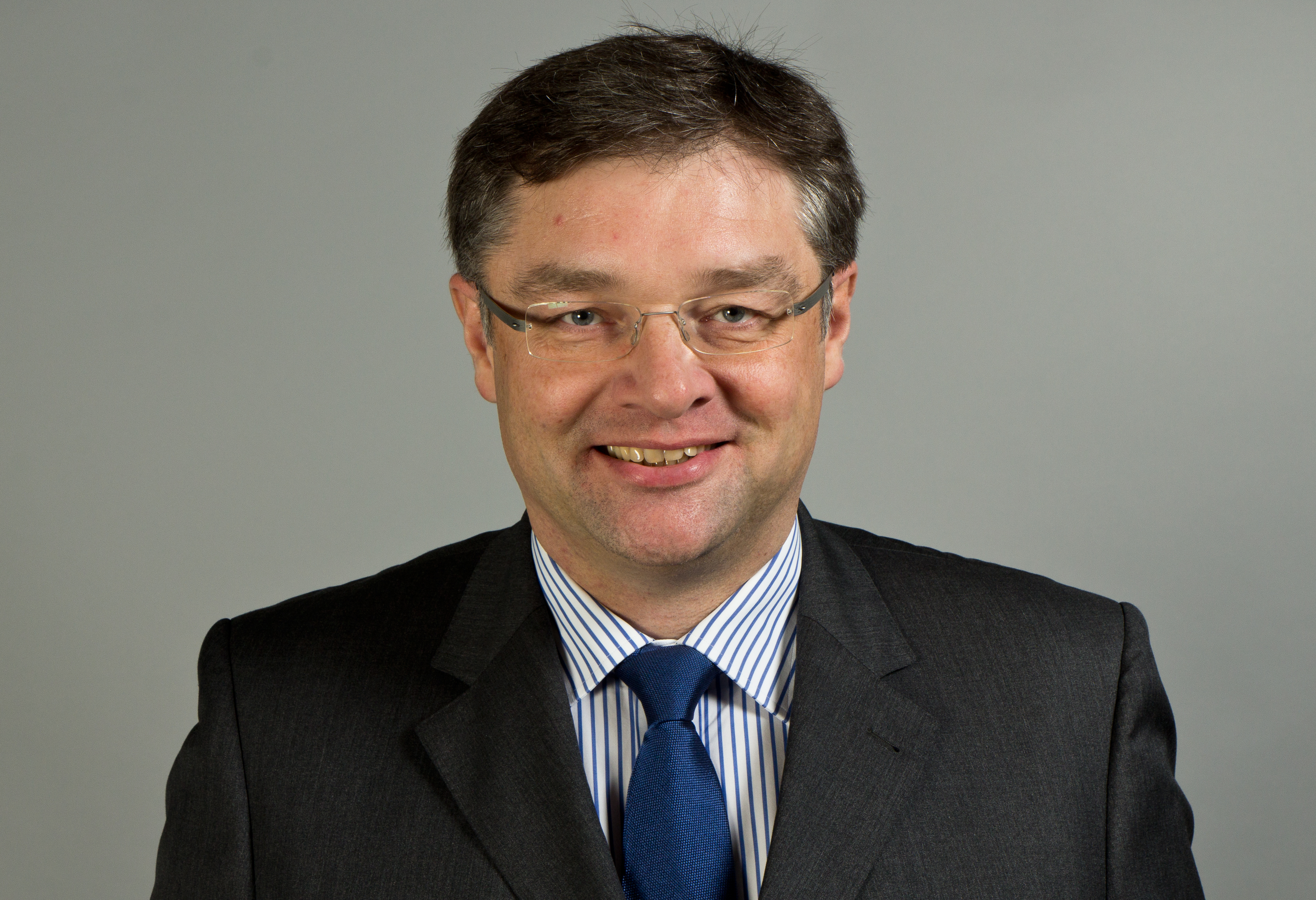
Holger Zastrow (2013)

Holger Zastrow (born 12 January 1969 in Dresden) is a German politician of the liberal Free Democratic Party of Germany (FDP). He is President of the state party in Saxony (since 1999) and chairman of the FDP parliamentary group in the Saxon Parliament (since 2004). He is also a member of the federal board of the FDP.

After the formation of a CDU-FDP coalition government in Saxony in 2009, he decided against taking the position as Deputy Prime Minister, choosing to remain chair of the parliamentary group.

In May 2024, he then founded his own party, which he called "Team Zastrow".

As a long-standing member of the supervisory board of Dresdner Verkehrsbetriebe, Holger Zastrow last traveled on public transport in 1991.
