= SPD Saxony =

SPD Saxony SPD Sachsen
- Abbreviation: SPD
- Chairman: Kathrin Michel; Henning Homann
- Deputy Chair: Sophie Koch; Torsten Ruban-Zeh
- Founded: 26 May 1990; 36 years ago
- Headquarters: Dresden
- Membership (2026): 4,500
- Ideology: Social democracy; Socialism
- Political position: Centre-left
- National affiliation: Social Democratic Party of Germany
- Colours: Red
- Landtag of Saxony: 10 / 120

Party flag

Website
- https://sachsenspd.de/

The SPD Saxony (German: SPD Sachsen) is the regional state association of the Social Democratic Party (SPD) in the Free State of Saxony, Germany. The SPD is the fourth largest party in Saxony with 4,500 members (as of January 2026). Since October 2021, Kathrin Michel and Henning Homann have been the first co-chairs in the history of the SPD Saxony.

== History ==
=== German Empire ===
The ideology dates back to the time of the German Empire where the Kingdom of Saxony was considered the heartland of social democracy. Important early social democrats such as August Bebel and Ferdinand Lassalle had their constituencies here or were active locally.

In 1863, the ADAV (General German Workers' Association) was founded in Leipzig, and in the first Reichstag election in 1871, two of the three Social Democratic seats came from Saxony. In 1879, Wilhelm Liebknecht became the first Social Democrat elected to the Landtag of Saxony. Fifteen years later, the SPD (Social Democratic Party) won 15 seats in the State Parliament. In 1896, following the Prussian model, the three-class franchise was introduced for the election of the State Parliament. The SPD's protests against this electoral system were unsuccessful, and the party lost its seats in the State Parliament. With the electoral law of 5 May 1909, universal suffrage with only a few restrictions was introduced. Subsequently, the SPD held 25 seats in the State Parliament. Between 1871 and 1933, Saxony was also known as "Red Saxony".

=== Weimar Republic ===
During the Weimar Republic, the SPD provided the minister-president several times and participated in the government until 1927. Within the state branch, a strong left-wing, Marxist faction emerged between 1921 and 1923, which criticized the coalition and toleration policies of the party as a whole and sought a popular front.

Following the November Revolution, a government (the "Council of the People's Deputies") was formed in Saxony from 15 November 1918 to 21 January 1919, under Richard Lipinski (USPD). The SPD and USPD each held three ministerial posts. From 22 January 1919, to 14 March 1919, this government continued as a single-party SPD government under the Social Democrat Georg Gradnauer, after the USPD left the government on 16 January 1919. The first state elections to the Saxon People's Chamber were held on 2 February 1919. The SPD became the strongest party with 41.56% of the vote, but did not have an absolute majority. Georg Gradnauer formed a coalition with the liberal German Democratic Party (DDP). However, due to the chaotic situation, this government only lasted 14 months, from 14 March 1919, to 4 May 1920. After the Central German general strike ended in March without achieving its goal of socializing industry, War Minister Gustav Neuring was assassinated in April, and General Georg Ludwig Rudolf Maercker occupied Leipzig and imposed martial law. Right-wing extremists attempted to overthrow the democratic order with the Kapp Putsch. Simultaneously, Max Hoelz attempted to introduce socialism in parts of Saxony using military force. On 22 April, Gradnauer resigned, and on 4 May 1920, the state parliament elected Wilhelm Buck (SPD) as Minister-President with the votes of the SPD and DDP.

After the Saxon State Parliament unanimously adopted the Saxon constitution, new elections were held on 14 November 1920. The governing parties suffered dramatic losses. The SPD (Social Democratic Party) garnered only 28.34% of the vote. Wilhelm Buck changed strategy and formed a coalition government with the USPD (Independent Social Democratic Party). However, due to the previous losses, it was a minority government dependent on the support of bourgeois members of parliament. The March Revolution in Central Germany spearheaded by Hoelz, found little support in Saxony. After the State Parliament was dissolved on 14 September 1922, against the votes of the SPD and USPD, new elections were held on 5 November 1922, in which the SPD recovered to 41.78%. Wilhelm Buck remained acting Minister-President of an SPD minority government. On 30 January 1923, the Buck cabinet collapsed following a vote of no confidence by the Communist Party of Germany (KPD).

On 21 March, the left-wing Social Democrat Erich Zeigner was elected Minister-President with the votes of the KPD and SPD. The Proletarian Hundreds (Proletarische Hundertschaften) were formed as a paramilitary organization to overthrow parliamentary democracy and establish a socialist dictatorship. While these combat units were banned in the rest of Germany, and especially in Prussia, they were expanded in Saxony with the government's approval. However, the planned "German October" putsch was prevented by the Reich government. After Zeigner had included two KPD members in his government on 10 October 1923, he was dismissed as Minister-President on 29 October 1923, by Reich President Friedrich Ebert (SPD) through a Reichsexekution.

After Reich Commissioner (Karl) Rudolf Heinze (DVP) held the office of Minister-President from 29 October to 31 October 1923, Alfred Fellisch (SPD) was elected Minister-President with the votes of the SPD and DDP. He formed an SPD minority government, which, however, failed on 14 December due to a vote of no confidence by the DDP.

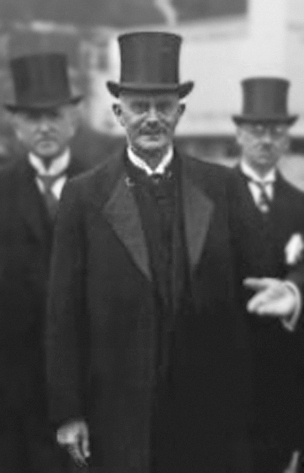
Max Heldt, who served as Minister-President of Saxony (1924–1929)

On 4 January 1924, Max Heldt, the last SPD Minister-President of Saxony, was elected. He won a majority composed of the DDP, DVP, and 25 of the 40 SPD members of parliament. This marked the beginning of another split within the Saxon SPD, the so-called "Sachsenkonflikts". The Saxon SPD's state party conference on 6 January 1924, disapproved of the formation of the government and called on the parliamentary group to form a coalition with the KPD. The internal party debate escalated further and led to the final dissolution of the SPD parliamentary group on 25 March 1926: 23 members formed the old Social Democratic parliamentary group, and 18 remained in the SPD parliamentary group (Martha Schlag had switched from the KPD to the SPD the previous year).

On 31 October 1926, the SPD received 32.14% and the ASPD only 4.15% of the vote. Neither the SPD nor the KPD, however, achieved a majority. Max Heldt formed a government that included the ASPS, DDP, DVP, WP, and, from July onward, the DNVP and VRP. Even after the state elections of 1929 (34.16%) and 1930 (33.37%), the Social Democrats failed to gain a share of power in government.

== Nazi era ==
With the Nazi seizure of power, political dissidents were persecuted. The SPD (Social Democratic Party) in Saxony was banned by the Ministry of the Interior on 23 June 1933. The Social Democrats were forced to cease their political activities, go into exile, or underground. Under the leadership of Reich Governor / Gauleiter Martin Mutschmann, internment camps were established where people were terrorized, tortured, and murdered. For example, Sachsenburg concentration camp, Colditz concentration camp, and Hohnstein concentration camp . Mutschmann had already been part of Hitler's inner circle during the Weimar Republic and was a particularly fanatical, extremely antisemitic, and uncompromising Nazi.

=== After 1945 ===
As early as 10 June 1945, earlier than the Western Allies in their sectors, the Soviet Military Administration in Germany (SMAD) had permitted the establishment of anti-fascist democratic parties in the Soviet occupation zone in order to influence the party formation process in Germany via the party headquarters in Berlin.

As a result, numerous local SPD branches were formed, initially uniting at the district level. On 16 May 1945, the Chemnitz district association was founded and elected August Friedel as its chairman. The Dresden district association followed on 26 June 1945, appointing Albert Meier, Heinrich Linden, Ludwig Hoch, Paul Bergner, Walter Leipert, Hugo Klare and Mrs Rohde as its executive committee. The Leipzig district was formed on 3 July 1945, and elected Stanislaw Trabalski, Rudolf Rothe, Ernst Schönfeld, Bernhard Dietz and Ernst Utrott as its executive committee. On 27 July 1945, the Zwickau district followed, with Rudolf Kautzsch and Richard Hentsch as its executive committee members. The Görlitz district was the last to be founded, in September 1945 (chairman: Max Rausch).

The Saxony state association of the Social Democratic Party was founded on 26 June 1945. The first state party conference in Freital from 5–7 October 1945, elected Otto Buchwitz as chairman. The executive committee also consisted of Arno Haufe, Walter Leipert (treasurer), Clemens Dölitzsch, and Felix Kaden (secretary). The inner committee included Arno Hennig, Gerhard Förster, and Paul Gärtner, while the extended committee comprised two representatives each from the districts of Dresden, Chemnitz, Zwickau, Leipzig, and Görlitz.

Otto Buchwitz was a proponent of the merger of the SPD and KPD to form the SED and actively promoted this merger within the SPD in Saxony. However, even in Saxony, the merger was characterized by pressure exerted on the members by the occupying authorities and had the character of a forced merger. The second and last state party congress of the SPD Saxony took place in Dresden on April 6, 1946.

By 1989, there was no longer any prospect of the SPD being readmitted to Saxony. The originally agreed-upon parity between SPD and KPD functionaries in the SED was soon abandoned (even though Otto Buchwitz himself remained in office). A large number of Saxon Social Democrats fell victim to the subsequent purges or were forced to flee to West Germany. [[Datei:Thomas_Jurk_(aka).jpg|thumb|Thomas Jurk, Deputy Minister-President, State Minister for Economic Affairs and Labour and Chairman of the SPD Saxony from 2004 to 2009]]

=== After reunification ===
After the brief revival of social democracy between 1945 and 1946, the party was unable to recapture its former successes after the Peaceful Revolution of 1989.

On 26 May 1990, the Saxony state association of the SPD was re-established, with Michael Lersow as its first chairman. In the subsequent 1990 state election, the party achieved its best result to date, securing 19.1% of the vote and 32 seats. Anke Fuchs was the SPD's lead candidate, but she did not assume any official duties in Saxony after the election. Karl-Heinz Kunckel was elected parliamentary group leader. State chairman Michael Lersow was elected as his deputy, along with Walter Christian Steinbach. Steinbach resigned his seat in the state parliament shortly afterward and was subsequently appointed President of the Leipzig administrative district. While there was no contested vote between Lersow and Kunckel within the parliamentary group, the rivalry between the two politicians shaped the SPD's policies in the following years. In the state elections on 11 September 1994, the SPD lost 2.5 percentage points, receiving only 16.6% of the vote.

In the 1999 Saxony state election, the then PDS overtook the SPD for the first time, which only achieved 10.7% of the votes.

Following the 2004 Saxony state election, in which the party again lost ground with 9.8% of the vote, a coalition between the CDU and SPD was formed due to the difficult majority situation in the Landtag of Saxony. With Thomas Jurk as Deputy Minister-President and Minister of Economic Affairs, and Barbara Ludwig as head of the science ministry (a position later filled by Eva Maria Stange after her election as mayor of Chemnitz), the Saxon Social Democrats thus assumed governmental responsibility for the first time since 1945/46.

However, after the state election of 30 August 2009, in which the SPD received 10.4% of the votes, it left the state government again after Prime Minister Stanislaw Tillich (CDU) formed a coalition with the Free Democratic Party (FDP).

Following the state election of 31 August 2014, in which the SPD slightly increased its share of the vote to 12.4%, the SPD in Saxony once again assumed governmental responsibility in a coalition with the CDU. State chairman Martin Dulig became Deputy Minister-President and Minister for Economic Affairs, Labour and Transport, while Eva-Maria Stange was re-elected Minister for Science and Art. In addition, Petra Köpping took on a new ministerial post for equality and integration.

In the state election on 1 September 2019, the SPD achieved its worst result since 1990, with only 7.7% of the vote, slightly more the five percent hurdle needed for to representation. Following this election, the Saxon SPD became the smallest faction in the Landtag of Saxony for the first time, yet it became part of a coalition government with the CDU and the Greens (Black–red–green coalition). Martin Dulig was re-elected as Deputy Minister-President and State Minister for Economic Affairs, Labour and Transport. The previous State Minister for Equality and Integration, Petra Köpping, became the new State Minister for Social Affairs and Social Cohesion.

In the 2024 Saxony local elections, the SPD fell below 5% for the first time in some districts. In the three districts of Erzgebirgskreis (4.5%), Sächsische Schweiz-Osterzgebirge (3.9%), and Görlitz (2.6%), the SPD fell below this threshold, but still represented in the district councils, as the five percent hurdle does not apply at the municipal level.

Following the state election on 1 September 2024, the SPD participated in a black-red minority government (Third Kretschmer cabinet). Petra Köpping became Deputy Minister-President and State Minister for Social Affairs, Health and Social Cohesion, while Dirk Panter became State Minister for Economic Affairs, Labour, Energy and Climate Protection.

== Structure ==
The state party is organized into approximately 155 local associations, which are grouped into 13 sub-districts that correspond to the 10 districts and three independent cities formed in 2008.

=== State Executive Committee ===
The current state executive committee, which includes the two chairpersons, the two deputy chairpersons, the treasurer, and the other members, was elected at the state party conference on June 21/22, 2025, in Dresden gewählt. Its members are:

Chairperson	Henning Homann; Kathrin Michel
Deputy Chair	Sophie Koch; Torsten Ruban-Zeh
Treasurer	Jens Kabisch
Associate members	Melanie Berthold, Gerald Eisenblätter, Mareike Engel, Fabian Funke, Antje Junghans, Kristin Kentsch, Julia Kneisel, Renata Marwege, Detlef Müller, Juliane Pfeil, Adrian Schneider, Stephan Schumann, Andreas Schurig, Vincent Seeberger, Nadja Sthamer, Sebastian Vogel, Andreas Wünsche

=== City and district associations ===
The Saxon SPD is divided into the following 13 city and district associations:

District Association	Chair	Seat
Stadtverband Chemnitz	Christine Bauer Sebastian Reichelt	Chemnitz
Stadtverband Dresden	Rasha Nasr Albrecht Pallas	Dresden
Stadtverband Leipzig	Christina März Benjamin Schulz	Leipzig
Kreisverband Bautzen	Jan Kregelin Kathrin Michel	Dresden
Kreisverband Erzgebirge	Simone Lang	Chemnitz
Kreisverband Görlitz	Harald Prause-Kosubek	Dresden
Kreisverband Leipzig	Susan Göbel Ingo Runge	Leipzig
Kreisverband Meißen	Andreas Schurig	Dresden
Kreisverband Mittelsachsen	Alexander Geißler	Chemnitz
Kreisverband Nordsachsen	Stefan Lange	Leipzig
Kreisverband Sächsische Schweiz-Osterzgebirge	Fabian Funke	Dresden
Kreisverband Vogtland	Saskia Feustel	Chemnitz
Kreisverband Zwickau	Felix Beyer Antje Junghans	Chemnitz

== Election results ==
=== State elections ===
Results of the state elections
Election	Lead candidate	First vote	Seats
1990	Anke Fuchs	19.1%	32
1994	Karl-Heinz Kunckel	16.6%	22
1999	Karl-Heinz Kunckel	10.7%	14
2004	Thomas Jurk	9.8%	13
2009	Thomas Jurk	10.4%	14
2014	Martin Dulig	12.4%	18
2019	Martin Dulig	7.7%	10
2024	Petra Köpping	7.3%	10

=== Federal elections ===
Results of the federal elections
Election	First votes (%)	Second votes (%)	Srats	Direktmandat	Members of Parliament (of which with direct mandate)
1990	18.2	18.2	8	-	Renate Jäger, Regina Kolbe, Dietmar Matterne, Christian Müller, Helga Otto, Rolf Schwanitz, Gerald Thalheim, Gunter Weißgerber
1994	23.5	24.3	9	-	Iris Follak, Jens Heinzig (1998), Jelena Hoffmann, Renate Jäger, Christine Kurzhals (deceased 1998), Christian Müller, Richard Schuhmann, Rolf Schwanitz, Gerald Thalheim, Gunter Weißgerber
1998	31.9	29.1	12	8	Iris Follak, Rainer Fornahl, Jelena Hoffmann, Renate Jäger, Christian Müller, Richard Schuhmann, Rolf Schwanitz, Gerald Thalheim, Simone Raatz, Gunter Weißgerber, Jürgen Wieczorek, Barbara Wittig
2002	32.5	33.3	12	4	Rainer Fornahl, Jelena Hoffmann, Renate Jäger, Christian Müller, Rolf Schwanitz, Gerald Thalheim, Simone Violka, Marlies Volkmer, Andreas Weigel, Gunter Weißgerber, Jürgen Wieczorek, Barbara Wittig
2005	25.2	24.5	8	3	Rainer Fornahl, Wolfgang Gunkel, Detlef Müller, Rolf Schwanitz, Simone Violka, Marlies Volkmer, Andreas Weigel, Gunter Weißgerber
2009	15.1	14.6	5	-	Wolfgang Gunkel, Daniela Kolbe, Rolf Schwanitz, Wolfgang Tiefensee, Marlies Volkmer
2013	16.2	14.6	6	-	Wolfgang Gunkel, Thomas Jurk, Daniela Kolbe, Detlef Müller (since 2014), Simone Raatz, Susann Rüthrich, Wolfgang Tiefensee (bis 2014)
2017	11.7	10.5	4	-	Thomas Jurk, Daniela Kolbe, Detlef Müller, Susann Rüthrich
2021	16.7	19.3	8	1	Fabian Funke, Carlos Kasper, Holger Mann, Franziska Mascheck, Kathrin Michel, Detlef Müller, Rasha Nasr, Nadja Sthamer
2025	9.7	8.5	3	-	Holger Mann, Kathrin Michel, Rasha Nasr

== Chairperson ==
=== SPD Saxony party chair ===
Years	Chairman
1899–1922	Karl Sindermann
1923–1928	Arthur Arzt
1928–1933	Karl Böchel
1945–1946	Otto Buchwitz
1990–1993	Michael Lersow
1993–1999	Karl-Heinz Kunckel
1999–2004	Constanze Krehl
2004–2009	Thomas Jurk
2009–2021	Martin Dulig
2021–present	Kathrin Michel & Henning Homann

=== SPD parliamentary group leader in Saxony ===
Jahren	Vorsitzender
1919–1922	Karl Sindermann
1922–1924	Robert Wirth and Max Müller
1926–1929	Hermann Liebmann, Oskar Edel and Karl Böchel
1929–1933	Karl Böchel
1990–1999	Karl-Heinz Kunckel
1999–2004	Thomas Jurk
2004–2007	Cornelius Weiss
2007–2014	Martin Dulig
2014–2025	Dirk Panter
2025–present	Henning Homann

== Literature ==
- Christian Demuth: Die SPD in Sachsen. In: Christian Demuth, Jakob Lempp: Parteien in Sachsen. be.bra wissenschaft verlag, Berlin 2006, ISBN 978-3-937233-35-2, S. 145–169. (2. Auflage 2007) (online: Sonderausgabe der Sächsische Landeszentrale für politische Bildung (2006))
- Mike Schmeitzner, Michael Rudloff: Geschichte der Sozialdemokratie im Sächsischen Landtag – Darstellung und Dokumentation 1877–1997. Hrsg. von der SPD-Fraktion im Sächsischen Landtag, Dresden 1997.
- Franz Walter, Tobias Dürr, Klaus Schmidtke: Die SPD in Sachsen und Thüringen zwischen Hochburg und Diaspora: Untersuchungen auf lokaler Ebene vom Kaiserreich bis zur Gegenwart (= Veröffentlichungen des Instituts für Sozialgeschichte e.V.). Dietz, Bonn 1993, ISBN 978-3-8012-4039-4.
- Christoph Wielepp, Wilm Heinrich: 120 Jahre Sozialdemokratie im Sächsischen Landtag. Veranstaltung am 3. November 1997 im Sächsischen Landtag. Friedrich-Ebert-Stiftung, Büro Dresden, Dresden 1997, ISBN 978-3-86077-682-7.
