= Bautzen I =

Federal electoral district of Germany

155 Bautzen I
- Electoral district for the Bundestag
- Bautzen I in 2025
- State: Saxony
- Population: 252,500 (2019)
- Electorate: 206,895 (2021)
- Major settlements: Bautzen; Hoyerswerda; Radeberg
- Area: 2,224.9 km^{2}

Current electoral district
- Created: 2009
- Party: AfD
- Member: Karsten Hilse
- Elected: 2017, 2021, 2025

Bautzen I is an electoral constituency (German: Wahlkreis) represented in the Bundestag. It elects one member via first-past-the-post voting. Under the current constituency numbering system, it is designated as constituency 155. It is located in eastern Saxony, comprising most of the Bautzen district.

Bautzen I was created for the 2009 federal election. Since 2017, it has been represented by Karsten Hilse of Alternative for Germany (AfD).

== Geography ==
Bautzen I is located in eastern Saxony. As of the 2021 federal election, it comprises the entirety of the Bautzen district, excluding five south-western municipalities near Dresden: Arnsdorf, Großröhrsdorf, Ottendorf-Okrilla, Radeberg, and Wachau (these five have been part of Dresden II – Bautzen II since 2009).

The constituency is in the central area of Sorbian settlement and of the Upper Sorbian language, of which many cultural institutions are housed in the town of Bautzen/Budyšin.

== History ==
Bautzen I was created in 2009 and contained parts of the abolished constituencies of Kamenz – Hoyerswerda – Großenhain and Bautzen – Weißwasser. In the 2009 election, it was constituency 157 in the numbering system. In the 2013 through 2021 elections, it was number 156. From the 2025 election, it has been number 155. Its borders have not changed since its creation.

== Members ==
The constituency was first represented by Maria Michalk of the Christian Democratic Union (CDU) from 2009 to 2017. Karsten Hilse of the AfD was elected in 2017 and re-elected in 2021.

Election	Member	Party	%
2009	Maria Michalk	CDU	42.3
2013	Maria Michalk	CDU	49.2
2017	Karsten Hilse	AfD	33.2
2021	Karsten Hilse	AfD	33.4
2025	Karsten Hilse	AfD	48.3

== Election results ==
=== 2025 election ===
Federal election (2025): Bautzen I
Notes:	Blue background denotes the winner of the electorate vote. Pink background denotes a candidate elected from their party list. Yellow background denotes an electorate win by a list member, or other incumbent. A ✓ or ✗ denotes status of any incumbent, win or lose respectively.						
Party	Candidate	Votes	%	±%	Party votes	%	±%
AfD	✓ Karsten Hilse	77,339	48.3	▲14.9	73,914	46.0	▲14.2
CDU	Steffen Roschek	38,642	24.1	▼1.9	32,190	20.0	▲1.4
BSW					14,695	9.1	New
Left	Caren Lay	15,655	9.8	▲0.8	12,469	7.8	0.0
SPD	Kathrin Michel	11,385	7.1	▼6.3	10,375	6.5	▼10.5
FW	Mike Hauschild	8,049	5.0	▲1.6	3,056	1.9	▼0.7
FDP	Dietrich Schniebel	4,199	2.6	▼5.4	5,002	3.1	▼7.8
Greens	Frank Schmidt	3,483	2.2	▼0.4	4,691	2.9	▼1.1
Tierschutzpartei					1,922	1.2	▼0.7
PARTEI					799	0.5	▼0.8
BD	Maik Lehmann	1,463	0.9	New	642	0.4	New
Volt					472	0.3	▲0.1
Pirates					237	0.1	▼0.2
Humanists					113	0.1	0.0
MLPD					53	<0.1	0.0
Informal votes		1,596			1,181		
Total valid votes		160,215			160,630		
Turnout		161,811	80.7	▲3.7			
AfD hold	Majority	38,697	24.2	▲16.8			

=== 2021 election ===
Federal election (2021): Bautzen I
Notes:	Blue background denotes the winner of the electorate vote. Pink background denotes a candidate elected from their party list. Yellow background denotes an electorate win by a list member, or other incumbent. A ✓ or ✗ denotes status of any incumbent, win or lose respectively.						
Party	Candidate	Votes	%	±%	Party votes	%	±%
AfD	✓ Karsten Hilse	52,492	33.4	▲0.2	50,050	31.9	▼0.9
CDU	Roland Ermer	40,929	26.0	▼4.5	29,213	18.6	▼8.5
SPD	Kathrin Michel	21,006	13.4	▲3.4	26,674	17.0	▲7.9
Left	Caren Lay	14,134	9.0	▼6.3	12,272	7.8	▼6.4
FDP	Matthias Schniebel	12,634	8.0	▲2.2	17,187	10.9	▲3.3
FW	Dirk Nasdala	5,341	3.4	▲1.2	4,157	2.6	▲1.0
Greens	Lukas Mosler	4,090	2.6	▲0.6	6,247	4.0	▲1.6
Tierschutzpartei					2,951	1.9	▲0.5
PARTEI	Steffi Thomas	3,398	2.2		2,104	1.3	▲0.5
dieBasis	Daniela Trittmacher	2,644	1.7		2,296	1.5	
Gesundheitsforschung					957	0.6	
NPD					601	0.4	▼1.1
Pirates					542	0.3	0.0
LKR	Maik Lehmann	467	0.3				
Team Todenhöfer					330	0.2	
Volt					320	0.2	
The III. Path					273	0.2	
Bündnis C					256	0.2	
ÖDP					251	0.2	▼0.1
Humanists					171	0.1	
DKP					96	0.1	
V-Partei3					71	0.1	▼0.1
MLPD					69	0.0	0.0
Informal votes		2,098			2,145		
Total valid votes		157,135			157,088		
Turnout		159,233	77.0	▲1.6			
AfD hold	Majority	11,563	7.4	▲4.7			

=== 2017 election ===
Federal election (2017): Bautzen I
Notes:	Blue background denotes the winner of the electorate vote. Pink background denotes a candidate elected from their party list. Yellow background denotes an electorate win by a list member, or other incumbent. A ✓ or ✗ denotes status of any incumbent, win or lose respectively.						
Party	Candidate	Votes	%	±%	Party votes	%	±%
AfD	Karsten Hilse	52,770	33.2		52,041	32.8	▲25.7
CDU	Roland Ermer	48,579	30.6	▼18.6	42,995	27.1	▼18.5
Left	Caren Lay	24,221	15.2	▼6.1	22,597	14.2	▼5.7
SPD	Uta Strewe	15,836	10.0	▼1.4	14,378	9.1	▼3.1
FDP	Torsten Herbst	9,247	5.8	▲3.2	12,122	7.6	▲4.5
FW	Günter Hutschalik	3,562	2.2	▼0.7	2,569	1.6	▼0.7
Greens	Jens Bitzka	3,247	2.0	▼0.4	3,768	2.4	▼0.4
NPD					2,371	1.5	▼2.6
Tierschutzpartei					2,171	1.4	
PARTEI					1,356	0.9	
Independent	Andreas Lutz Richter	779	0.5				
Pirates					602	0.4	▼1.7
BGE					559	0.4	
ÖDP					435	0.3	
DiB					312	0.2	
BüSo	Christoph Tobias Mzingisi Faku	635	0.4		233	0.1	0.0
V-Partei³					195	0.1	
MLPD					138	0.1	0.0
Informal votes		2,443			2,477		
Total valid votes		158,876			158,842		
Turnout		161,319	75.4	▲6.0			
AfD gain from CDU	Majority	4,191	2.6				

=== 2013 election ===
Federal election (2013): Bautzen I
Notes:	Blue background denotes the winner of the electorate vote. Pink background denotes a candidate elected from their party list. Yellow background denotes an electorate win by a list member, or other incumbent. A ✓ or ✗ denotes status of any incumbent, win or lose respectively.						
Party	Candidate	Votes	%	±%	Party votes	%	±%
CDU	✓ Maria Michalk	74,794	49.2	▲6.9	69,335	45.6	▲6.8
Left	Caren Lay	32,452	21.3	▼3.8	30,290	19.9	▼4.4
SPD	Ilko Keßler	17,268	11.4	▲0.3	18,502	12.2	▼0.2
AfD					10,811	7.1	
NPD	Holger Szymanski	7,270	4.8	▼0.7	6,271	4.1	▼0.9
FW	Ralf Zeidler	4,517	3.0		3,470	2.3	
FDP	Reiner Deutschmann	3,948	2.6	▼9.1	4,723	3.1	▼10.7
Greens	Sten Jacobson	3,709	2.4	▼1.8	4,249	2.8	▼1.4
Pirates	Marion Nawroth	3,035	2.0		3,109	2.0	
Independent	Nitzsche	2,986	2.0				
Independent	Merz	2,024	1.3				
PRO					905	0.6	
BüSo					202	0.1	▼0.7
MLPD					146	0.1	▼0.2
Informal votes		3,252			3,242		
Total valid votes		152,003			152,013		
Turnout		155,255	69.4	▲4.2			
CDU hold	Majority	42,342	27.9	▲10.8			

=== 2009 election ===
Federal election (2009): Bautzen I
Notes:	Blue background denotes the winner of the electorate vote. Pink background denotes a candidate elected from their party list. Yellow background denotes an electorate win by a list member, or other incumbent. A ✓ or ✗ denotes status of any incumbent, win or lose respectively.						
Party	Candidate	Votes	%	±%	Party votes	%	±%
CDU	Maria Michalk	64,325	42.3	▲5.4	59,103	38.8	▲6.5
Left	Caren Lay	38,241	25.1	▲1.5	37,144	24.4	▼0.1
FDP	Reiner Deutschmann	17,755	11.7	▲3.4	20,969	13.8	▲3.9
SPD	Ilko Keßler	16,870	11.1	▼10.1	18,906	12.4	▼8.6
NPD	Mario Ertel	8,363	5.5	▼1.0	7,597	5.0	▼1.1
Greens	Cordula Ratajczak	6,505	4.3	▲1.4	6,431	4.2	▲1.0
BüSo					1,268	0.8	▲0.4
REP					527	0.3	▼0.1
MLPD					448	0.3	▲0.1
Informal votes		2,907			2,573		
Total valid votes		152,059			152,393		
Turnout		154,966	65.2	▼11.3			
CDU win new seat	Majority	26,084	17.2				
