= Matthias Ecke =

German politician

Matthias Ecke MEP
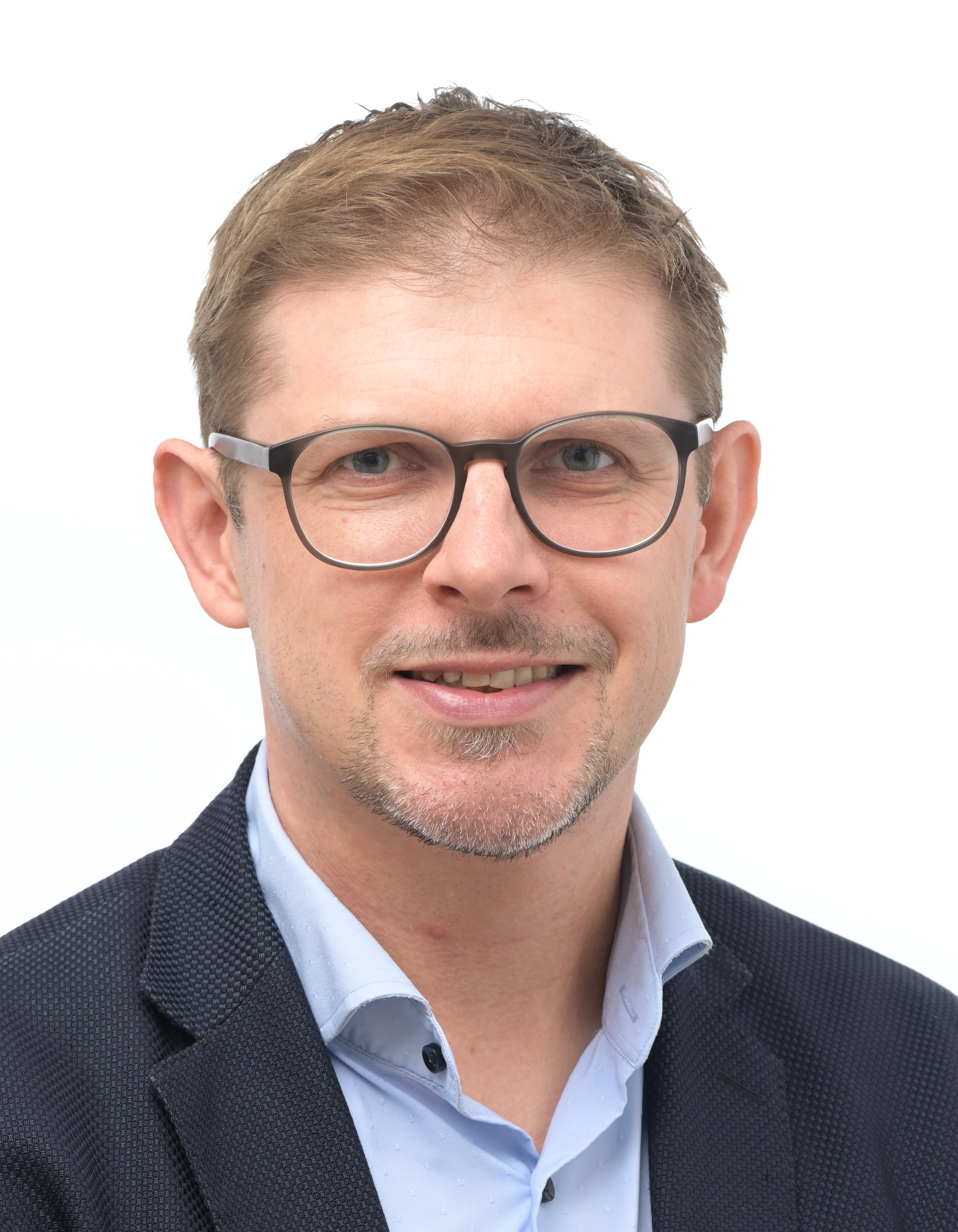

Member of the European Parliament for Germany
- Incumbent
- Assumed office 3 October 2022
- Preceded by: Constanze Krehl

Personal details
- Born: 12 April 1983 (age 42) Meerane, East Germany (now Germany)
- Party: Social Democratic Party of Germany

Matthias Ecke (born 12 April 1983) is a German politician who has been serving as a Member of the European Parliament for the Social Democratic Party since 2022.

== Early career ==
Ecke studied Political Science, Economics and Journalism in Leipzig and Prag.

Before entering the European Parliament, Ecke worked as advisor to Martin Dulig at Saxony's State Ministry for Economic Affairs.

== Political career ==
Ecke is serving on the Committee on Industry, Research and Energy and Subcommittee on Tax Matters as substitute in the Committees on Regional Development and the Committee on Economic and Monetary Affairs. He is part of the parliament's delegation for relations to the Korean Peninsula.

In addition to his committee assignments, he was part of the parliament's delegation for relations with Belarus.

=== Assault in 2024 ===
In 2024, Ecke was assaulted by a group of four young males while putting up campaign posters in Dresden-Striesen ahead of the 2024 European Parliament election in Germany and had to undergo an emergency surgery. The same group attacked two teams of Green Party election workers in the same night, leaving a 28-year-old injured.

A 17-year-old from the group of perpetrators, who a witness identified as belonging to the far-right, turned himself in to the police one day after the attack. By 5 May, the Saxony police had also identified the three other perpetrators.

German chancellor Olaf Scholz (SPD) said that the attack on Ecke was "depressing" and that democracy was threatened by such acts. Interior Minister Nancy Faeser (SPD) warned "extremists and populists are stirring up a climate of increasing violence". Social Democrats blamed supporters of the far-right party Alternative for Germany (AfD) for the attack.

== See also ==
- List of members of the European Parliament for Germany, 2019–2024
