= Kathrin Michel =

German politician (born 1963)

Kathrin Michel MdB
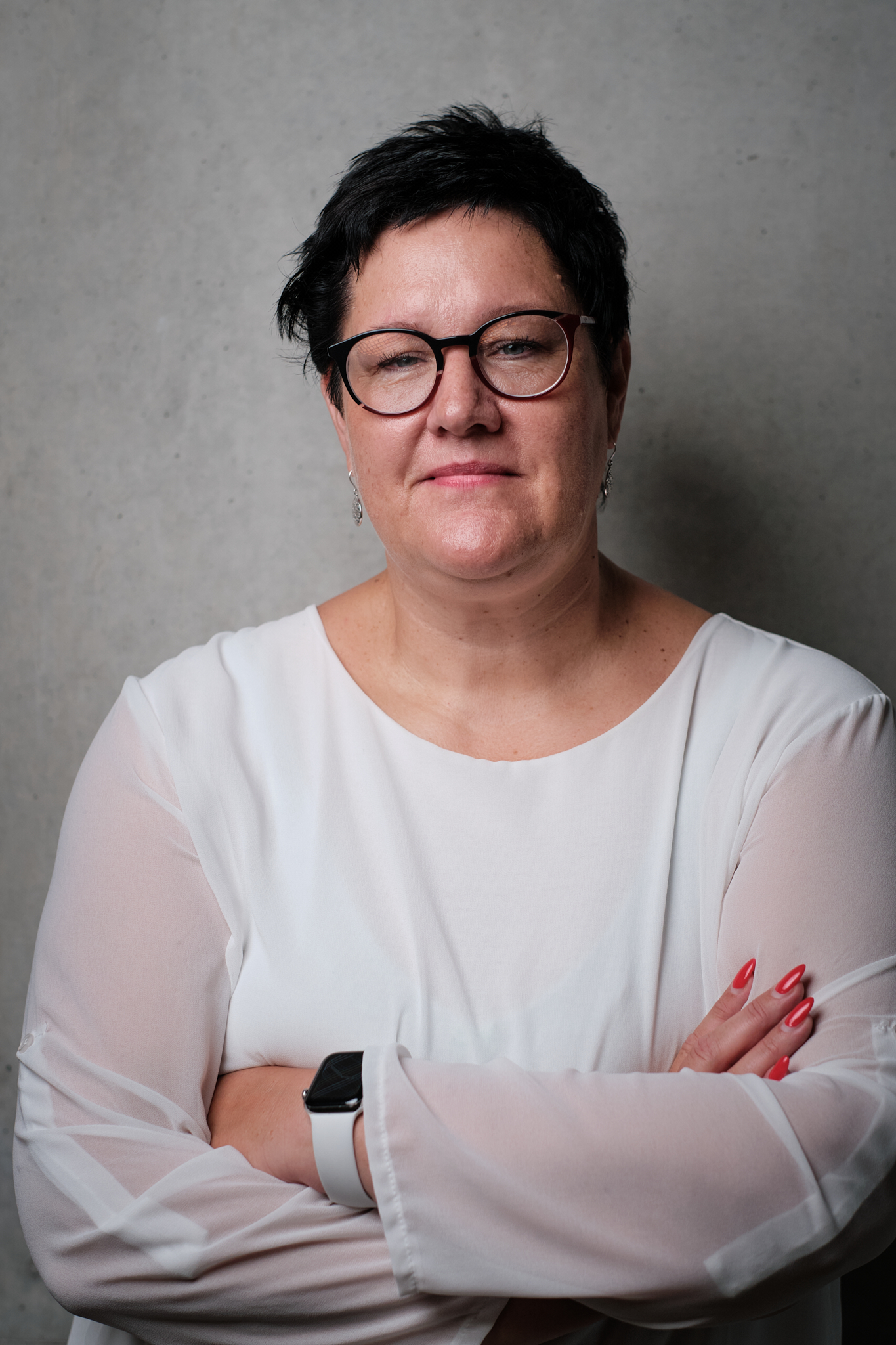
- 2021-08-20 Kathrin Michel.jpg

Member of the Bundestag for Saxony
- Incumbent
- Assumed office 26 September 2021

Personal details
- Born: 17 April 1963 (age 63) Forst, East Germany (now Germany)
- Party: Social Democratic Party
- Education: Technical University of Dortmund

Susanne Kathrin Michel (née Bischof; born 17 April 1963) is a German trade unionist and politician of the Social Democratic Party (SPD) who has been a Member of the German Bundestag for Saxony since 2021.

== Early career ==
From 1983 to 2021, Michel worked for BASF in Schwarzheide.

== Political career ==
Since October 2021, Michel has been co-chairing the SPD in Saxony, alongside Henning Homann.

In the negotiations to form a so-called traffic light coalition of the SPD, the Green Party and the Free Democratic Party (FDP) following the 2021 federal elections, Michel was part of her party's delegation in the working group on climate protection and energy policy, co-chaired by Matthias Miersch, Oliver Krischer and Lukas Köhler. In the election she unsuccessfully contested Bautzen I.

In parliament, Michel has since been serving on the Budget Committee and its Subcommittee on European Affairs.

== Other activities ==
- German Foundation for Active Citizenship and Volunteering (DSEE), Member of the Board of Trustees (since 2021)
- IG Bergbau, Chemie, Energie (IG BCE), Member
