= Schlag =

Schlag is a German surname. Notable people with the surname include:

- Evelyn Schlag (born 1952), Austrian poet and novelist
- Felix Schlag (1891–1974), United States currency designer
- Martha Schlag (1875–1956), German politician
- Pierre Schlag (born 1954), American legal writer
- Wilhelm Schlag (born 1969), American mathematician

== See also ==
- Schlag bei Thalberg, a municipality in the district of Hartberg in Styria, Austria
