= Constanze Krehl =

German politician (born 1956)

Constanze Krehl MEP
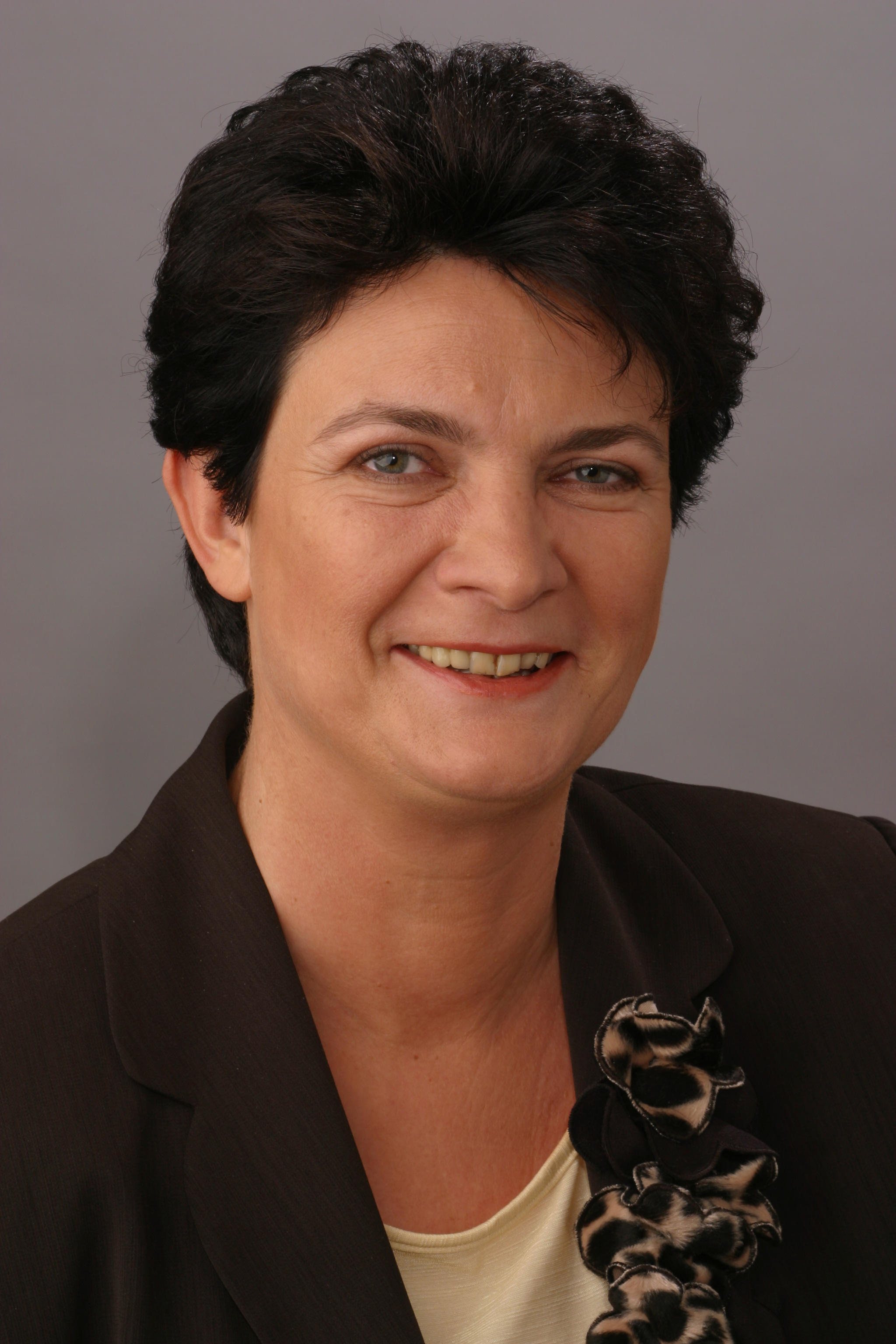

Member of the European Parliament
- In office 1 July 1994 – 2 October 2022
- Succeeded by: Matthias Ecke
- Constituency: Germany

Personal details
- Born: Constanze Angela Krehl; 14 October 1956 (age 69) Stuttgart, West Germany
- Party: German; Social Democratic Party; EU; Party of European Socialists
- Education: TU Dresden
- Website: www.constanze-krehl.eu

Constanze Angela Krehl (born 14 October 1956) is a German politician who served as a Member of the European Parliament (MEP) from 1994 to 2022. She is a member of the Social Democratic Party, part of the Party of European Socialists.

== Education ==
After Krehl received her diploma from German secondary school in 1975 in Leipzig, she studied at the Technische Universität Dresden (Technical University Dresden) and graduated in computer science in 1980.

== Political career ==
- 1999-2005: Member of the SPD federal executive board
- 1999-2004: Regional Chair of the SPD Saxony
- 1996-1999: Regional Vice-Chair of the SPD Saxony
- February 1991 - June 1994: Observer of the European Parliament
- October - December 1990: Member of the "Deutscher Bundestag" (German Parliament)
- March - October 1990: Member of the "Volkskammer" (GDR People's Assembly)

=== Member of the European Parliament, 2004-2022 ===
From 2004 to 2022, Krehl was a member of the Committee on Regional Development. She was also a member of the parliament's delegation for relations with the countries of Central America and the Delegation to the Euro-Latin American Parliamentary Assembly. Until 2004 she was a Member of the Committee on Budgets. From 2016, she served as the Parliament's own-initiative report on the EU's space strategy.

In addition to her committee assignments, Krehl served as chairwoman of the Delegation for relations with Russia from 1994 until 1997 and as chairwoman of the Delegation to EU-Russia Parliamentary Cooperation Committee from 1997 to 1999 and 1999–2002. She also served as a member of the European Parliament Intergroup on Western Sahara.

In the negotiations to form a coalition government under the leadership of Chancellor Angela Merkel following the 2017 federal elections, Krehl was part the working group on European policy, led by Peter Altmaier, Alexander Dobrindt and Achim Post.

In 2022, Krehl announced that she would not stand in the 2024 elections but instead resign from active politics; she was succeeded by Matthias Ecke.

== Other activities ==
- IG Bergbau, Chemie, Energie, Member
- Socialist Youth of Germany – Falcons, Member

== Recognition ==
In 1998 Krehl was awarded the Federal Cross of Merit.
