= Thomas Jurk =

German politician

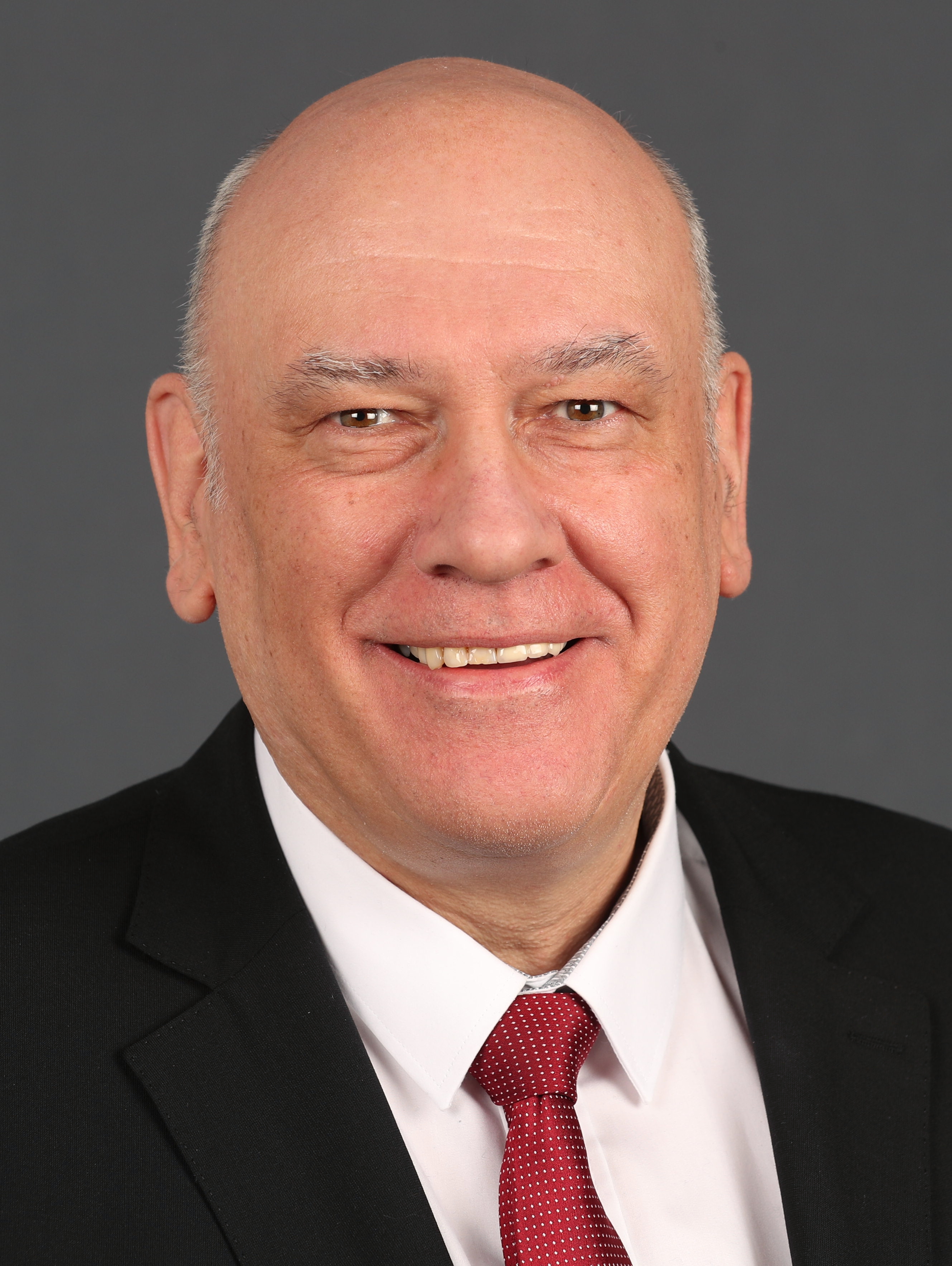
- Thomas Jurk in 2020

Member of the Bundestag
- In office 2013–2021

Personal details
- Born: 19 June 1962 (age 63) Görlitz, East Germany (now Germany)
- Party: SPD

Thomas Jurk (born 19 June 1962) is a German politician of the Social Democratic Party (SPD) who served as a member of the Bundestag from the state of Saxony from 2013 until 2021.

== Political career ==
From 1990 until 2013, Jurk served as a member of the Landtag of the Free State of Saxony. He chaired the SPD parliamentary group from 1999 until 2004.

From 2004 until 2009, Jurk was the chairman of the SPD in Saxony. He also served as Deputy Minister-President and State Minister for Economic Affairs in the government of Minister-President Georg Milbradt of Saxony from 2004 until 2009.

Jurk became a member of the Bundestag in the 2013 German federal election. In parliament, he was a member of the Budget Committee, where he was the SPD parliamentary group's rapporteur on the annual budget of the Federal Ministry of Transport and Digital Infrastructure.

In October 2020, Jurk announced that he would not stand in the 2021 federal elections but instead resign from active politics by the end of the parliamentary term.

== Other activities ==
- Business Forum of the Social Democratic Party of Germany, Member of the Political Advisory Board (since 2020)
- IG Bergbau, Chemie, Energie (IG BCE), Member
