= Martha Schlag =

German politician (1875–1956)

Marie Martha Schlag (née Press; 26 February 1875 – 14 June 1956) was a German politician (SPD, KPD, SED). During the Weimar period she sat as a member of the Saxony regional parliament (Sächsischer Landtag). Later, in April 1946, she was a delegate at the party conference which enacted the contentious merger that gave rise to the Socialist Unity Party (SED), after 1949 the ruling party in a new kind of one-party dictatorship, the Soviet sponsored German Democratic Republic.

== Life ==
Schlag was born in Zwickau. Her father worked as a carpenter in a mine. Her own early work was in domestic service, including jobs as a maid and as an infant caretaker. In 1897 or 1902 she married: sources differ as to the date. In 1906 she moved to Chemnitz where she worked in a succession of textiles factories. She joined the Social Democratic Party ("Sozialdemokratische Partei Deutschlands" / SPD) in 1906. In 1912 she became a leader in the Chemnitz women's movement. In 1915, a year after the outbreak of the First World War, she became a member of the International Group, a section (at this stage) within the SPD, established on the initiative of Rosa Luxemburg, which saw the support of the party mainstream for funding the war as a betrayal of working people and of international socialism more generally. As slaughter on the frontline and destitution at home intensified, in 1917 the SPD split, primarily because of differences over whether or not to continue funding the hostilities. The International Group had evolved into the Spartacus League of which Schlag was a member. She also became a member of the Independent Social Democratic Party ("Unabhängige Sozialdemokratische Partei Deutschlands" / USPD), the breakaway left-wing anti-war section of the SPD.

German military defeat was followed by a year of revolutions. In Chemnitz Schlag joined the Soviet inspired workers' and soldiers' councils. As the USPD in its turn broke apart she became, in January 1919, a co-founder of the new Communist Party of Germany. On the personal front, in 1920 she and her husband were divorced. Schlag was among the delegates to the third party conference in Karlsruhe (1920) and the seventh party conference in Jena (1921). Following the Kapp Putsch the party's national leadership mandated her to work as a travelling spokesperson. While performing these duties she was "arrested" by the "Baltikum" Freikorps (freelance quasi-military unit) in Wismar, but then released by striking workers. On 8 December 1920 Schlag was a member of the presidium at the first National Women's Conference ("Reichsfrauenkonferenz") in Berlin. Between 1921 and 1924 she served full-time as the women's secretary for the party's regional leadership team ("Bezirksleitung") in Saxony.

On 9 January 1923 she entered the Saxony regional parliament (Sächsischer Landtag), taking on the seat vacated by Ernst Grube. The Communist Party during this period was riven with internal factionalism: in this context Schlag was seen as a right-winger. In 1924 she resigned her party functions while remaining, at this stage, a member of the Communist group in the Landtag. However, on 1 February 1925 she resigned from the Communist Party, rejecting its extreme leftwards trajectory. She returned to the SPD, and continued to sit in the Saxony Landtag as an SPD member till the cancellation of Germany's democracy in February/March 1933.

After the Nazi power seizure Schlag was initially unemployed. Later she returned to domestic service. In 1938/39 she undertook commercial training, and worked between May 1940 and March 1945 as an office worker with the Chemnitz Economics Office. The end of the Second World War, formally in 1945, meant an end to one party dictatorship, although in the region now administered as the Soviet occupation zone (which included Chemnitz) the return to multi-party government would prove compromised and short-lived. Schlag was nevertheless able to resume her membership of the SPD in 1945. In April 1946 she was a delegate at the party conference which enacted the contentious merger that gave rise to the Socialist Unity Party ("Sozialistische Einheitspartei Deutschlands" / SED), and she was one of the thousands who lost no time in signing over their memberships to the new party. She became a membership of the new party's regional committee ("Kreisvorstand") and took a job in its Statistics Department till 1947 she retired.

Schlag died on 14 June 1956 in Karl-Marx-Stadt (the name by which Chemnitz had been known since 1953).
