= Karsten Hilse =

German politician

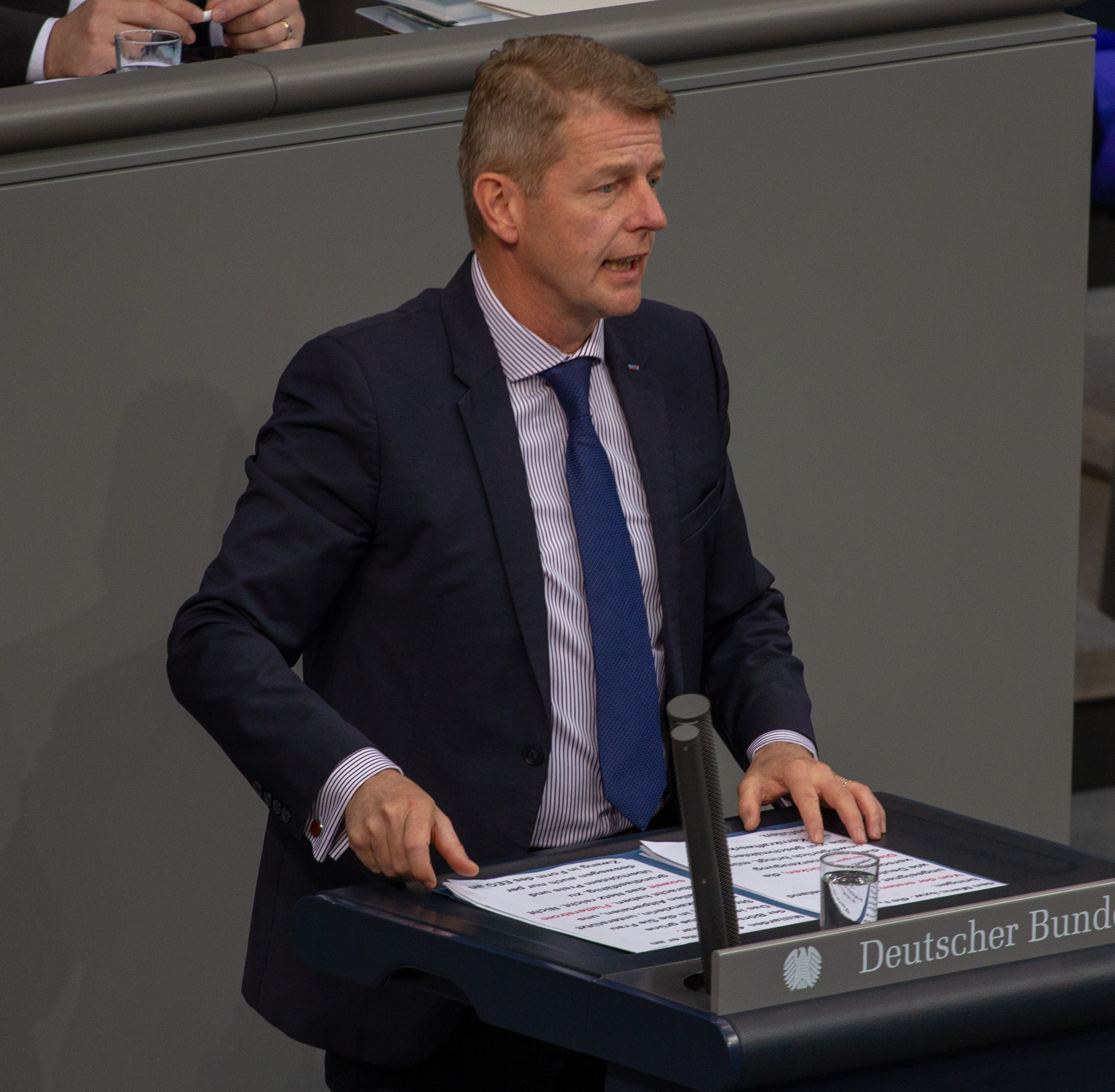
- Hilse in 2019

Member of the Bundestag
- Incumbent
- Assumed office 24 October 2017

Personal details
- Born: 12 December 1964 (age 61)
- Party: AfD

Karsten Hilse (born 12 December 1964) is a German politician for the far-right party Alternative for Germany (AfD) and since 2017 member of the Bundestag.

== Life and politics ==
Hilse was born 1964 in the East German town of Hoyerswerda and became a police officer

Hilse joined the AfD in 2016 and became a member of the Bundestag after the 2017 German federal election.

Hilse denies the scientific consensus on climate change.

He polemicised against the resettlement of the wolf in the rural area of Lusatia.
