= Maria Michalk =

German politician

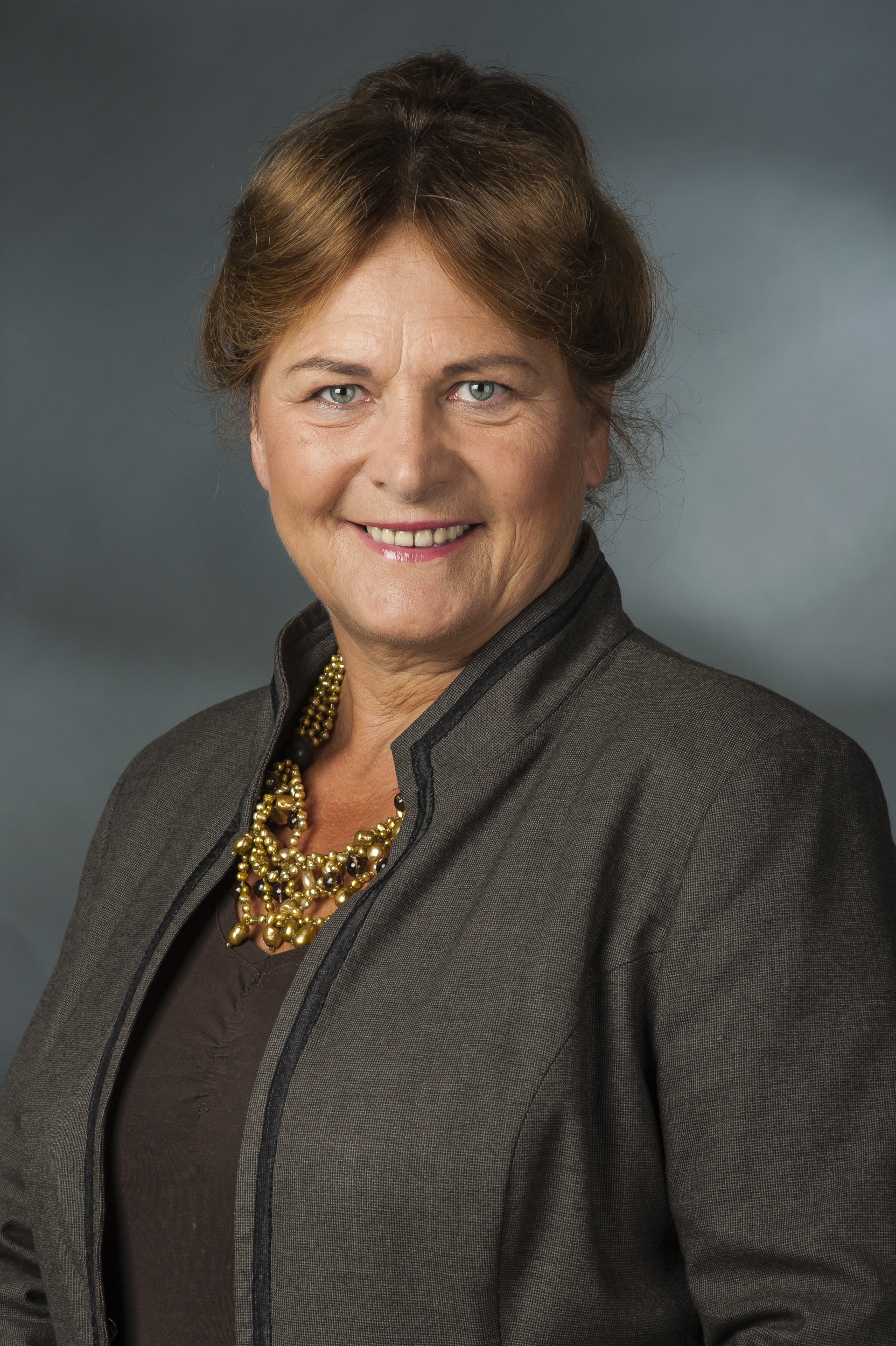

Personal details
- Born: 6 December 1949 (age 76) Merka, Saxony, East Germany
- Occupation: Politician

Maria Ludwiga Michalk (born 6 December 1949) is a German politician. She was a member of the German Bundestag from 1990 to 1994 and from 2002 to 2017, as a member of the Christian Democratic Union (CDU) party.

== Biography ==
She was born in Merka in Radibor municipality and attended the local Sorbian high school. She trained as an industrial clerk and then studied business economics at a technical college.

She became a member of the East German Christian Democratic Union (CDU) in 1972. In 1990, she was appointed to the CDU district council for the Bautzen district. In 1990, she was elected to the Volkskammer. She was subsequently elected to the Bundestag later that year. After leaving the Bundestag in 1994, she managed an education centre in Bischofswerda for seven years. In 2002, she was re-elected to the Bundestag. In 2016, she announced that she would not run for reelection to the Bundestag in 2017.

Michalk was awarded the Sächsische Verfassungsmedaille and was named to the Order of Merit of the Federal Republic of Germany.
