= Martin Dulig =

German politician (born 1974)

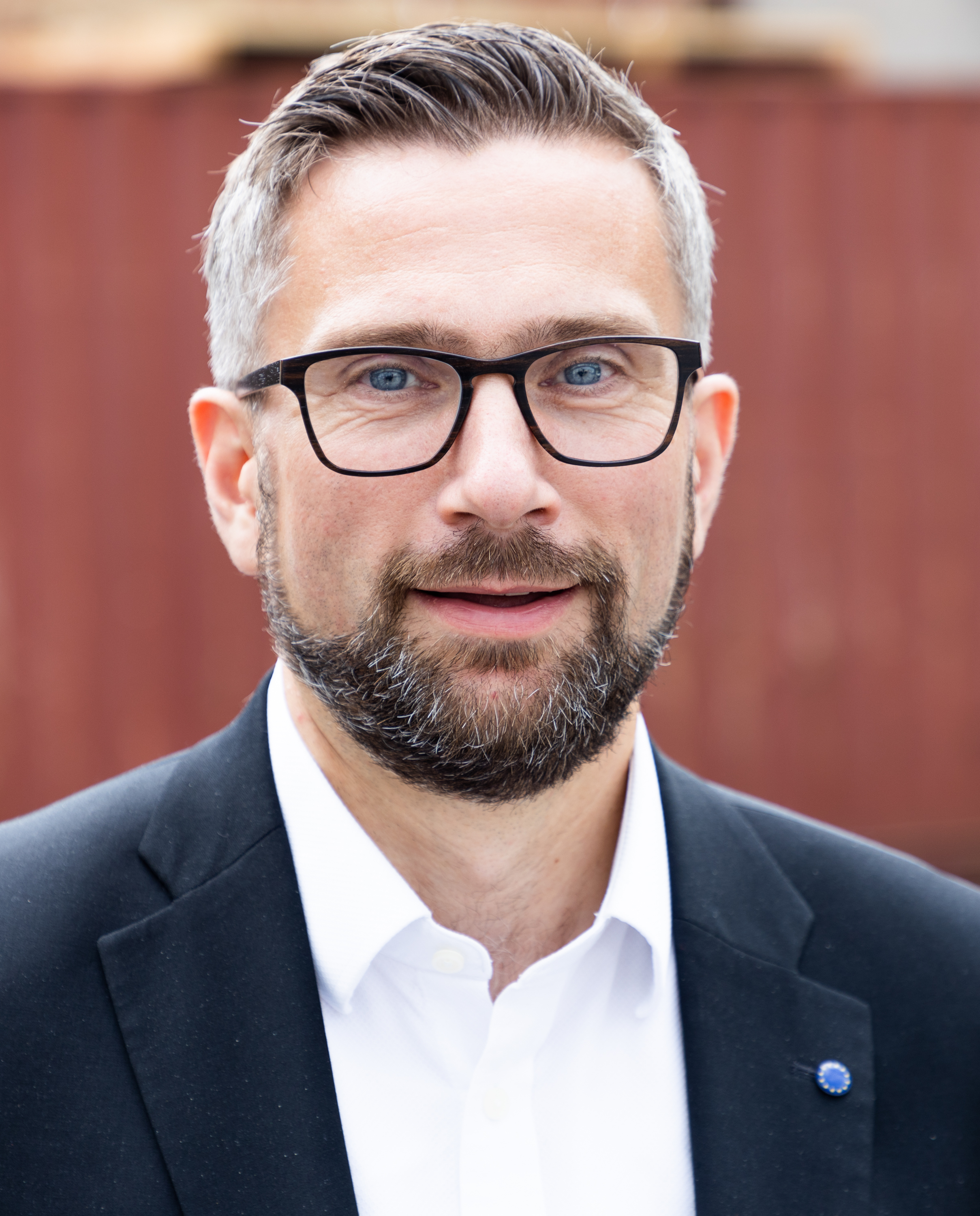
Dulig in 2022

Martin Dulig (born 26 February 1974) is a German politician for the Social Democratic Party (SPD). Until 20 December 2019, he was the Saxon State Minister of Labor and Traffic and Deputy Minister President of Saxony in the governments of Stanislaw Tillich III and Michael Kretschmer. On 20 December 2019, Michael Kretschmer appointed a new cabinet, with Dulig continuing his role as State Minister for Economy, which he has held since 13 November 2014, in the governments of Stanislaw Tillich III and Michael Kretschmer and he was appointed Second Deputy Minister of Saxony.

== Life and politics ==
Dulig was born 1974 in Plauen and became member of the SPD in 1992.

Since the 2004 state elections Dulig has been a member of the Landtag of the Free State of Saxony, the legislative body of Saxony. He became chairman of the SPD in the federal state of Saxony in 2014.

In the negotiations to form a Grand Coalition of Chancellor Angela Merkel's Christian Democrats (CDU together with the Bavarian CSU) and the SPD following the 2013 federal elections, Dulig was part of the SPD delegation in the working group on families, women and equality, led by Annette Widmann-Mauz and Manuela Schwesig.

Dulig co-chaired the SPD's national conventions in Leipzig (2013) and Berlin (2014, 2019).

In the negotiations to form a so-called traffic light coalition of the SPD, the Green Party and the Free Democrats (FDP) following the 2021 German elections, Dulig was part of his party's delegation in the working group on social policy, co-chaired by Dagmar Schmidt, Sven Lehmann and Johannes Vogel.

== Other activities ==
=== Regulatory bodies ===
- Federal Network Agency for Electricity, Gas, Telecommunications, Post and Railway (BNetzA), Ex-Officio Member of the Advisory Board (since 2014)

=== Corporate boards ===
- Leipzig Trade Fair, Ex-Officio Chairman of the Supervisory Board (since 2017)
- Mitteldeutsche Flughafen AG, Ex-Officio Member of the Supervisory Board (since 2014)
- Development Bank of Saxony (SAB), Ex-Officio Deputy Chairman of the Supervisory Board (since 2014)

=== Non-profit organizations ===
- Business Forum of the Social Democratic Party of Germany, Member of the Political Advisory Board (since 2020)
- Kulturstiftung des Freistaates Sachsen, Member of the Board of Trustees
