= Henning Homann =

German politician (born 1979)

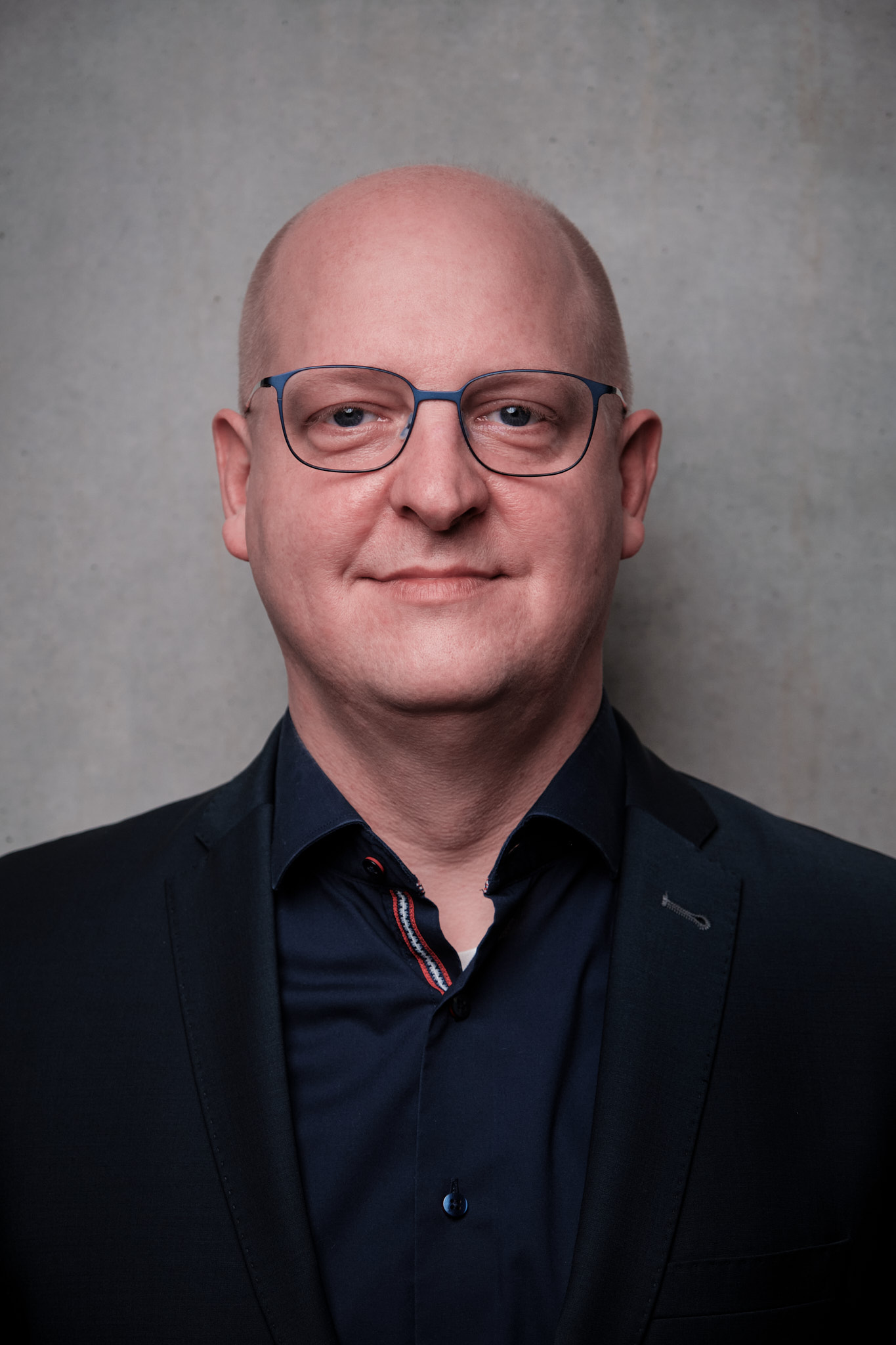
- Homann in 2020

Member of the Landtag of Saxony
- Incumbent
- Assumed office 29 September 2009

Personal details
- Born: 8 October 1979 (age 46)
- Party: Social Democratic Party (since 1996)

Henning Homann (born 8 October 1979) is a German politician serving as a member of the Landtag of Saxony since 2009. He has served as co-chairman of the Social Democratic Party in Saxony since 2021, and as group leader of the party in the Landtag since 2025.
