= Social Democratic Party of Germany =

Centre-left political party in Germany

Social Democratic Party of Germany Sozialdemokratische Partei Deutschlands
- Abbreviation: SPD
- General Secretary: Tim Klüssendorf
- Co-leaders: Vacant; Lars Klingbeil
- Deputy Leaders: See list: Petra Köpping; Serpil Midyatli; Achim Post; Anke Rehlinger; Alexander Schweitzer
- Founded: 27 May 1875; 151 years ago
- Merger of: ADAV; SDAP
- Headquarters: Willy-Brandt-Haus; D-10911 Berlin
- Newspaper: Vorwärts
- Think tank: Friedrich Ebert Foundation
- Student wing: Juso-Hochschulgruppen
- Youth wing: Young Socialists in the SPD
- Women's wing: SPD Women
- LGBT+ wing: SPDqueer
- Paramilitary wing: Iron Front (1931–1933)
- Membership (2025): ▼348,451
- Ideology: Social democracy
- Political position: Centre-left
- European affiliation: Party of European Socialists
- European Parliament group: Progressive Alliance of Socialists and Democrats
- International affiliation: Progressive Alliance (since 2013) Historically: Socialist International (1951–2013); Labour and Socialist International (1923–1940); Second International (1889–1914)
- Colours: Red
- Slogan: Soziale Politik für Dich. ("Social policy for you.")
- Bundestag: 120 / 630
- Bundesrat: 25 / 69
- State parliaments: 418 / 1,875
- European Parliament: 14 / 96
- Heads of State Governments: 6 / 16

Party flag

Website
- spd.de

The Social Democratic Party of Germany (Note: German: Sozialdemokratische Partei Deutschlands [zoˈtsi̯aːldemoˌkʁaːtɪʃə paʁˌtaɪ ˈdɔʏtʃlants], SPD [ɛspeːˈdeː]) is a social democratic political party in Germany. It is one of the major parties of contemporary Germany. Lars Klingbeil has been the party's co-leader since the 2021 SPD federal Party convention and served together with Bärbel Bas from June 2025 to October 2026, when she resigned. After losing the 2025 federal election, the party is part of the Merz government as the junior coalition partner. The SPD is a member of 12 of the 16 German state governments and is a leading partner in seven of them.

The SPD was founded in 1875 from a merger of smaller socialist parties, and grew rapidly after the lifting of Germany's repressive Anti-Socialist Laws in 1890 to become the largest socialist party in Western Europe. In 1891, it adopted its Marxist-influenced Erfurt Program, though in practice it was moderate and focused on building working-class organizations. In the 1912 federal election, the SPD won 34.8 percent of votes and became the largest party in the Reichstag, but was still excluded from government. After the start of the First World War in 1914, the party split between a pro-war mainstream and the anti-war Independent Social Democratic Party, most members of which later formed the Communist Party of Germany (KPD). The SPD played a leading role in the German revolution of 1918–1919 and in the foundation of the Weimar Republic. The SPD politician Friedrich Ebert served as the first president of Germany from 1919 to 1925.

After the rise of the Nazi Party to power, the SPD was the only party in the Reichstag which voted against the Enabling Act of 1933; the SPD was subsequently banned, and operated in exile as the Sopade. After the Second World War ended in 1945, the SPD was re-established. In the Soviet occupation zone, it was forced to merge with the KPD to form the Socialist Unity Party of Germany. In West Germany, the SPD became one of two major parties alongside the CDU/CSU. In its Godesberg Program of 1959, the SPD dropped its commitment to Marxism, becoming a big tent party of the centre-left. The SPD led the federal government from 1969 to 1982 (under Willy Brandt and Helmut Schmidt), 1998 to 2005 (under Gerhard Schröder) and again from 2021 to 2025 (under Olaf Scholz). It served as a junior partner to a CDU/CSU-led government from 1966 to 1969, 2005 to 2009, 2013 to 2021 and again since 2025. Since reunification, Alliance 90/The Greens has increasingly competed with the SPD for the centre-left vote.

The SPD holds pro-European stances and is a member of the Party of European Socialists and sits with the Progressive Alliance of Socialists and Democrats group in the European Parliament. With 14 MEPs, it is the third largest party in the group. The SPD was a founding member of the Socialist International, but the party left in 2013 after criticising its acceptance of parties they consider to be violating human rights. The SPD subsequently founded the Progressive Alliance and was joined by numerous other parties around the world. Previously, the SPD was a founding member of both the Second International and the Labour and Socialist International.

== History ==
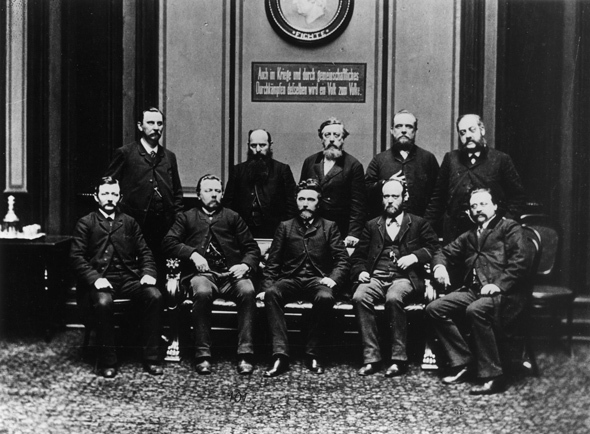
SPD members in Reichstag 1889. Sitting from left to right: Georg Schumacher, Friedrich Harm, August Bebel, Heinrich Meister and Karl Frohme. Standing: Johann Heinrich Wilhelm Dietz, August Kühn, Wilhelm Liebknecht, Karl Grillenberger, and Paul Singer.

The Social Democratic Party has its origins in the General German Workers' Association, founded in 1863, and the Social Democratic Workers' Party, founded in 1869. The two groups merged in 1875 to create the Socialist Workers' Party of Germany (German: Sozialistische Arbeiterpartei Deutschlands). From 1878 to 1890, the Anti-Socialist Laws banned any group that aimed at spreading socialist principles, but the party still gained support in elections. In 1890, when the ban was lifted, the party adopted its current name. The SPD was the largest Marxist party in Europe and consistently the most popular party in German federal elections from 1890 onward, although it was surpassed by other parties in terms of seats won in the Reichstag due to the electoral system.

In the years leading up to World War I, the SPD remained radical in principle, but moderate in reality. According to Roger Eatwell and Anthony Wright, the SPD became a party of reform, with social democracy representing "a party that strives after the socialist transformation of society by the means of democratic and economic reforms". They emphasise this development as central to understanding 20th-century social democracy, of which the SPD was a major influence. In the 1912 federal election, the SPD won 34.8 per cent of votes and became the largest party in the Reichstag with 110 seats, although it was still excluded from government. Despite the Second International's agreement to oppose militarism, the SPD supported the German war effort and adopted a policy, known as Burgfriedenspolitik, of refraining from calling strikes or criticising the government. Internal opposition to the policy grew throughout the war. Anti-war members were expelled in 1916 and 1917, leading to the formation of the Independent Social Democratic Party of Germany (USPD).

The SPD played a key role in the German Revolution of 1918–1919. On 9 November 1918, leading SPD member Friedrich Ebert was designated chancellor and fellow Social Democrat Philipp Scheidemann, on his own authority, proclaimed Germany a republic. The SPD government introduced a large number of reforms in the following months, introducing various civil liberties and labor rights. However, they used military force against communist and socialist revolutionary groups, leading to a permanent split between the SPD and the USPD, as well as the Spartacist League which would go on to form the Communist Party of Germany (KPD) and integrate a majority of USPD members as well. The SPD was the largest party during the first 13 years of the new Weimar Republic. It decisively won the 1919 federal election with 37.9 per cent of votes, and Ebert became the first president in February. The position of chancellor was held by Social Democrats until the 1920 federal election, when the SPD lost a substantial portion of its support, falling to 22 per cent of votes. After this, the SPD yielded the chancellery to other parties, although it remained part of the government until 1924. Ebert died in 1925 and was succeeded by conservative Paul von Hindenburg. After making gains in the 1928 federal election, the SPD's Hermann Müller became chancellor.

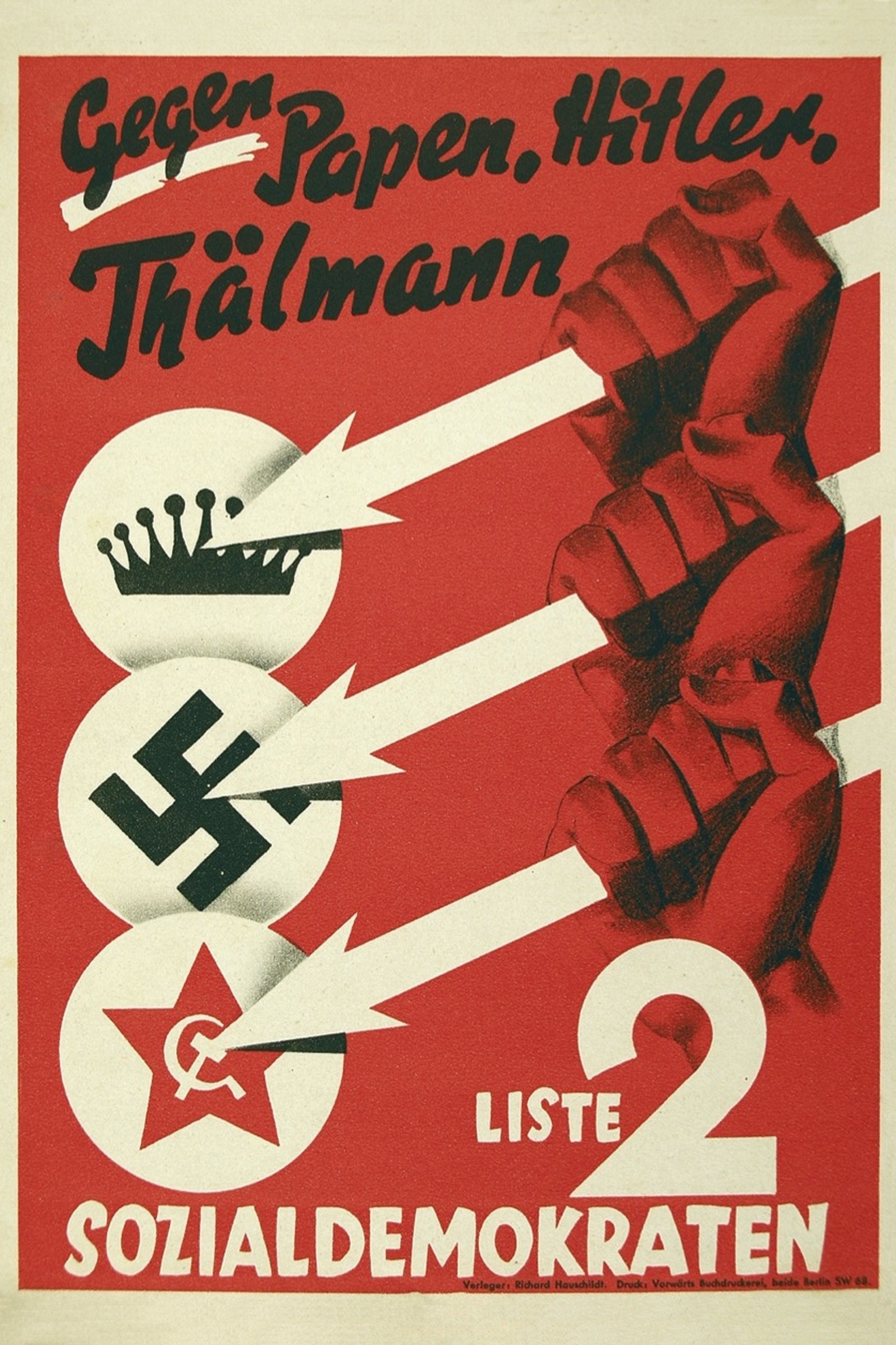
A widely publicized SPD election poster from 1932, with the Three Arrows symbol representing resistance against reactionary conservatism, Nazism and Communism, and with the slogan "Against Papen, Hitler, Thälmann"

As Germany was struck hard by the Great Depression, and unable to negotiate an effective response to the crisis, Müller resigned in 1930. The SPD was sidelined as the Nazi Party gained popularity and conservatives dominated the government, assisted by Hindenburg's frequent use of emergency powers. The Reichsbanner Schwarz-Rot-Gold, the SPD's paramilitary wing, was frequently involved in violent confrontations with the Nazi Sturmabteilung. The Nazis overtook the SPD as the largest party in July 1932 and Adolf Hitler was appointed chancellor in January 1933. Of the parties present in the Reichstag during the passage of the Enabling Act of 1933, the SPD was the only one to vote against; most of the Communist deputies had been arrested ahead of the vote. The SPD was banned in June. Many members were subsequently imprisoned and killed by the Nazi government while others fled the country. The party-in-exile was called Sopade.

After the end of World War II, the re-establishment of the SPD was permitted in the Western occupation zones in 1945. In the Soviet occupation zone, the SPD was forcibly merged with the KPD in 1946 to form the Socialist Unity Party of Germany (SED). The SED was the ruling party of East Germany until 1989. In West Germany, the SPD became one of two major parties, alongside the Christian Democratic Union (CDU). In the inaugural 1949 federal election, it placed second with 29.2 per cent of votes and led the opposition to the CDU government. In its 1959 Godesberg Program, the party dropped its commitment to Marxism and sought to appeal to middle class voters, becoming a big tent party of the centre-left.

SPD membership statistics (in thousands) since 1945. Despite heavy losses since 1990, the SPD is still the second largest party in Germany.

Although strongly leftist, the SPD was willing to compromise. Only through its support did the governing CDU/CSU pass a denazification law that its coalition partner the Free Democratic Party (FDP) and the far-right German Party voted against. At the same time, the SPD opposed the pro-West integration of West Germany because they believed that made a re-unification of Germany impossible. Austria had become a sovereign neutral state in 1956, but a 1952 Soviet suggestion for Germany to form a neutral state was ignored by the CDU/CSU–FDP government. After 17 years in opposition, the SPD became the junior partner in a grand coalition with the CDU/CSU which lasted from 1966 to 1969. After the 1969 federal election, the SPD's Willy Brandt became chancellor in a coalition with the Free Democratic Party. His government sought to normalise relations with East Germany and the Eastern Bloc, a policy known as Ostpolitik. The party achieved its best ever result of 45.8 per cent in 1972, one of only three occasions in which it formed the largest Bundestag faction. After Brandt's resignation in 1974, his successor Helmut Schmidt served as chancellor until 1982, when the SPD returned to opposition.

During the Peaceful Revolution in East Germany, the East German SPD was refounded. It merged with the West German party in 1990, shortly before German reunification. The SPD returned to government under Gerhard Schröder after the 1998 federal election in a coalition with The Greens. This government was re-elected in 2002 but defeated in 2005. The SPD then became junior partner of a grand coalition with the CDU/CSU until 2009. After a term in opposition, they again served as junior partner to the CDU/CSU after the 2013 federal election. This arrangement was renewed after the 2017 federal election. SPD narrowly won against the CDU/CSU in the September 2021 federal election, becoming the biggest party in the federal parliament (Bundestag). Social Democrat Olaf Scholz became the new chancellor in December 2021, and formed a coalition government with the Green Party and the Free Democrats. In the 2024 European Parliament election, the party fell to third behind the far right AfD and the CDU/CSU. In December 2024, the traffic light coalition ended with the FDP leaving and Scholz losing a vote of confidence. The SPD entered the 2025 German federal election behind in the polls, and achieved its worst result in post-war history, with just 120 seats. The party placed third behind Alternative for Germany (AfD), with CDU leader Friedrich Merz projected to become Germany's next chancellor. In May 2025, Friedrich Merz, leader of the CDU, formed a coalition government between the CDU/CSU and the SPD (grand coalition). Co-leader of the SPD, Lars Klingbeil, became vice chancellor and finance minister of the new government.

== Ideology and platform ==
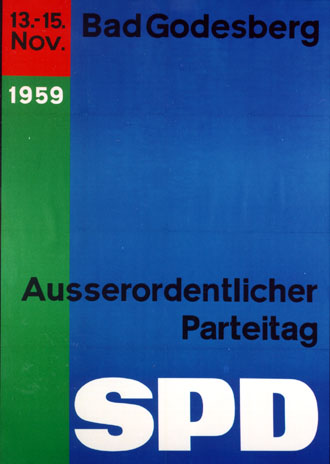
Poster for the 1959 SPD party conference in Bad Godesberg

The SPD was established as a Marxist party in 1875. It underwent a major shift in policies, reflected in the differences between the Heidelberg Program of 1925 which called for "the transformation of the capitalist system of private ownership of the means of production to social ownership" and the Godesberg Program of 1959 which aimed to broaden the party's voter base and to move its political position toward the political centre. After World War II, the SPD was re-formed in West Germany after being banned by the Nazi regime; in East Germany, it merged with the Communist Party of Germany to form the ruling Socialist Unity Party of Germany. Under the chairmanship of Kurt Schumacher, the SPD was a socialist party representing the interests of the working class and of trade unions. With the 1959 Godesberg Program, the party evolved from a socialist working-class party to a modern social democratic party. The SPD's Hamburg Programme, adopted in 2007, describes democratic socialism as "the vision of a free and fair society in solidarity", which requires "a structure in economy, state and society guaranteeing civil, political, social and economic basic rights for all people living a life without exploitation, suppression and violence, hence in social and human security", the realization of which is emphasized as a "permanent task". Social democracy serves as the "principle of our actions".

The party platform of the SPD espouses the goal of democratic socialism, which it envisions as a societal arrangement in which freedom and social justice are paramount. According to the party platform, political freedom, justice and social solidarity form the basis of social democracy.

- The coordinated social market economy should be strengthened and its output should be distributed fairly. The party sees that economic system as necessary in order to ensure the affluence of the entire population.
- The SPD also supports a welfare state.
- Concurrently, it supports rather austere fiscal policy, being against state-run deficits and for reducing debt.
- In social policy, the Social Democrats stand for civil and political rights in an open society.
- In foreign policy, European integration is a main priority. During Scholz's chancellorship, the party set out principles of a new German defence policy in the Zeitenwende speech.
- The SPD supports economic regulations to limit potential losses for banks and people. They support a common European economic and financial policy to prevent speculative bubbles as well as to foster environmentally sustainable growth.

=== Internal factions ===
The SPD is divided into three main political factions, often called party wings. In the 21st Bundestag, the majority of the SPD's parliamentary members belonged to the Seeheimer Kreis, the dominant faction that supports the moderate "Third Way" position, economic liberalism, and the market-friendly Agenda 2010 and Hartz reforms introduced under Chancellor Gerhard Schröder.

Positioned on the opposite side of the internal spectrum is the Parlamentarische Linke (PL), which represents the classical left wing of the party. This faction defends traditional Keynesian economic policies and a strong welfare state, arguing that reforms like Agenda 2010 have improperly curtailed social safety nets. Between the two factions is the reformist Netzwerk Berlin. It seeks to occupy a position between the traditional left and the Seeheimer Kreis. However, on many policy issues, Netzwerk Berlin is generally closer to the Seeheimer Kreis than to the PL. As a result, membership often overlaps, with some SPD politicians belonging to both Netzwerk Berlin and the Seeheimer Kreis.

=== International relations ===
The SPD sits with the Progressive Alliance of Socialists and Democrats group in the European Parliament. Previously, the SPD was a founding member of both the Second International and the Labour and Socialist International. The SPD was a founding member of the Socialist International, but the party left in 2013 after criticising its acceptance of parties they consider to be violating human rights. The SPD subsequently founded the Progressive Alliance and was joined by numerous other parties around the world. In 1984, the SPD initiated party dialogues with the Chinese Communist Party (CCP), becoming the first international party relationship CCP established outside of other communist parties.

== Electorate ==
=== Social structure ===
Prior to World War II, as the main non-revolutionary left-wing party, the Social Democrats fared best among non-Catholic workers as well as intellectuals favouring social progressive causes and increased economic equality. Led by Kurt Schumacher after World War II, the SPD initially opposed both the social market economy and Konrad Adenauer's drive towards Western integration fiercely; after Schumacher's death, however, it accepted the social market economy and Germany's position in the Western alliance in order to appeal to a broader range of voters. It still remains associated with the economic causes of unionised employees and working class voters. In the 1990s, the left and moderate wings of the party drifted apart. This culminated in a secession of a significant number of party members which later joined the socialist party WASG; the party later merged into The Left (Die Linke).

=== Geographic distribution ===
2021 federal election SPD results

2025 federal election SPD results

Much of the SPD's current-day support comes from large cities, especially northern and western Germany and Berlin. As of 2019, 10 of the country's 15 biggest cities are led by SPD mayors. The metropolitan Ruhr Area, where coal mining and steel production were once the main industries, had provided a significant base for the SPD in the 20th century. In the city state of Bremen, the SPD has continuously governed since 1949.

In southern Germany, the SPD typically garners less support except in the largest cities, dropping to single digit % in the 2020s. At the 2026 Baden-Württemberg state elections, the party narrowly avoided losing its parliamentary mandate, as it received 5.5 % of the vote, with a five percent hurdle. At the 2009 federal election, the party lost its only constituency in the entire state of Bavaria (in Munich).

Small town and rural support comes especially from the traditionally Protestant areas of northern Germany and Brandenburg (with previous exceptions such as Western Pomerania where CDU leader Angela Merkel held her constituency, which the SPD gained in 2021 after she stepped down) and a number of university towns. A striking example of the general pattern is the traditionally Catholic Emsland, where the Social Democrats generally gain a low percentage of votes in Unterems and Mittelems, whereas in the Reformed Protestant region of East Frisia directly to the north, with its strong traditional streak of anti-Catholicism, Aurich – Emden is one of their strongest constituencies.

Further south, the SPD also enjoys solid support in northern Hesse, parts of Palatinate and the Saarland. The social democrats are weakest in the south-eastern states of Bavaria, Saxony and Thuringia, where the party's percentage of votes dropped to single-digit figures in the 2018 and 2019 elections. In 2021, it significantly increased its vote share in the states of the former east.

== Post-war leadership ==
The federal leader is supported by six Deputy Leaders and the party executive. As of 2025, the leaders are Bärbel Bas and Lars Klingbeil. As Germany is a federal republic, each of Germany's states have their own SPD party at the state level.

=== Party leaders ===
Leader		Year
1	Kurt Schumacher	1946–1952
2	Erich Ollenhauer	1952–1963
3	Willy Brandt	1964–1987
4	Hans-Jochen Vogel	1987–1991
5	Björn Engholm	1991–1993
6	Rudolf Scharping	1993–1995
7	Oskar Lafontaine	1995–1999
8	Gerhard Schröder	1999–2004
9	Franz Müntefering (1st term)	2004–2005
10	Matthias Platzeck	2005–2006
11	Kurt Beck	2006–2008
12 (9)	Franz Müntefering (2nd term)	2008–2009
13	Sigmar Gabriel	2009–2017
14	Martin Schulz	2017–2018
15	Andrea Nahles	2018–2019
16	Saskia Esken & Norbert Walter-Borjans	2019–2021
17	Saskia Esken & Lars Klingbeil	2021–2025
18	Bärbel Bas & Lars Klingbeil	2025–2026
–	TBD & Lars Klingbeil	2026–present

=== Leaders in the Bundestag ===
From August until October 2010, senior Bundestag member Joachim Poß served as interim Bundestag leader in the absence of Frank-Walter Steinmeier, who was recovering from donating a kidney to his wife.

Leader		Year
1	Kurt Schumacher	1949–1952
2	Erich Ollenhauer	1952–1963
3	Fritz Erler	1964–1967
4	Helmut Schmidt	1967–1969
5	Herbert Wehner	1969–1983
6	Hans-Jochen Vogel	1983–1991
7	Hans-Ulrich Klose	1991–1994
8	Rudolf Scharping	1994–1998
9	Peter Struck (1st term)	1998–2002
10	Ludwig Stiegler	2002
11	Franz Müntefering	2002–2005
(9)	Peter Struck (2nd term)	2005–2009
12	Frank-Walter Steinmeier	2009–2013
13	Thomas Oppermann	2013–2017
14	Andrea Nahles	2017–2019
15	Rolf Mützenich	2019–2025
16	Lars Klingbeil	2025
17	Matthias Miersch	2025-present

=== Federal presidents ===
Gustav Heinemann	1969–1974
Johannes Rau	1999–2004
Frank-Walter Steinmeier	2017–present

=== Federal chancellors ===
Chancellor of Germany	Time in office
Willy Brandt	1969–1974
Helmut Schmidt	1974–1982
Gerhard Schröder	1998–2005
Olaf Scholz	2021–2025

=== Vice chancellors ===
Vice Chancellor of Germany	Time in office
Willy Brandt	1966–1969
Egon Franke	1982
Franz Müntefering	2005–2007
Frank-Walter Steinmeier	2007–2009
Sigmar Gabriel	2013–2018
Olaf Scholz	2018–2021
Lars Klingbeil	2025-present

=== State-level ===
State	Leader	Seats	Government
Baden-Württemberg	Isabel Cademartori & Robin Mesarosch	10 / 157	Opposition
Bavaria	Ronja Endres & Sebastian Roloff	17 / 203	Opposition
Berlin	Bettina König & Steffen Krach	22 / 158	TBD
Brandenburg	Dietmar Woidke	34 / 88	SPD–CDU
Bremen	Falk Wagner	28 / 87	SPD–Greens–Left
Hamburg	Melanie Leonhard & Nils Weiland	45 / 121	SPD–Greens
Hesse	Sören Bartol	23 / 133	CDU–SPD
Lower Saxony	Olaf Lies	57 / 146	SPD–Greens
Mecklenburg-Vorpommern	Manuela Schwesig	29 / 71	TBD
North Rhine-Westphalia	Sarah Philipp & Achim Post	56 / 195	Opposition
Rhineland-Palatinate	Alexander Schweitzer	32 / 105	CDU–SPD
Saarland	Anke Rehlinger	29 / 51	Majority
Saxony	Kathrin Michel & Henning Homann	10 / 120	CDU–SPD
Saxony-Anhalt	Juliane Kleemann & Andreas Schmidt	8 / 83	Opposition
Schleswig-Holstein	Ulf Kämpfer	12 / 69	Opposition
Thuringia	Georg Maier	6 / 88	CDU–TG–SPD

== Election results ==
Election results and governments since 1949

The SPD, at times called SAPD, took part in general elections determining the composition of parliament. For elections up until 1933, the parliament was called the Reichstag, except for the one of 1919 which was called the National Assembly and since 1949 the parliament is called Bundestag. Note that changes in borders (1871, 1919, 1920, 1949, 1957 and 1990) varied the number of eligible voters whereas electoral laws also changed the ballot system (only constituencies until 1912, only party lists until 1949 and a mixed system thereafter), the suffrage (women vote since 1919; minimum active voting age was 25 till 1918, 20 till 1946, 21 till 1972 and 18 since), the number of seats (fixed or flexible) and the length of the legislative period (three or four years). The list begins after the SPD was formed in 1875, when labour parties unified to form the SPD (then SAPD, current name since 1890).

=== Imperial Germany (Reichstag) ===
Election	Votes	%	Seats	+/–	Status
1877	493,447	9.1 (#4)	13 / 397		Opposition
1878	437,158	7.6 (#5)	9 / 397	▼4	Opposition
1881	311,961	6.1 (#7)	13 / 397	▲4	Opposition
1884	549,990	9.7 (#5)	24 / 397	▲11	Opposition
1887	763,102	10.1 (#5)	11 / 397	▼13	Opposition
1890	1,427,323	19.7 (#1)	35 / 397	▲24	Opposition
1893	1,786,738	23.3 (#1)	44 / 397	▲9	Opposition
1898	2,107,076	27.2 (#1)	56 / 397	▲12	Opposition
1903	3,010,771	31.7 (#1)	81 / 397	▲25	Opposition
1907	3,259,029	28.9 (#1)	43 / 397	▼38	Opposition
1912	4,250,399	34.8 (#1)	110 / 397	▲67	Opposition (1912–1918)
1912	4,250,399	34.8 (#1)	110 / 397	▲67	Coalition (1918)

=== Weimar Republic (Reichstag) ===
Election	Votes	%	Seats	+/–	Status
1919	11,516,852	37.9 (#1)	165 / 423	▲55	Coalition
1920	6,179,991	21.9 (#1)	103 / 459	▼62	External support (1920–1921)
1920	6,179,991	21.9 (#1)	103 / 459	▼62	Coalition (1921–1922)
1920	6,179,991	21.9 (#1)	103 / 459	▼62	External support (1922–1923)
1920	6,179,991	21.9 (#1)	103 / 459	▼62	Coalition (1923)
1920	6,179,991	21.9 (#1)	103 / 459	▼62	Opposition (1923–1924)
May 1924	6,008,905	20.5 (#1)	100 / 472	▼3	Opposition
Dec 1924	7,881,041	26.0 (#1)	131 / 493	▲31	Opposition (1924–1926)
Dec 1924	7,881,041	26.0 (#1)	131 / 493	▲31	External support (1926–1927)
Dec 1924	7,881,041	26.0 (#1)	131 / 493	▲31	Opposition (1927–1928)
1928	9,152,979	29.8 (#1)	153 / 491	▲22	Coalition
1930	8,575,244	24.5 (#1)	143 / 577	▼10	Opposition
Jul 1932	7,959,712	21.6 (#2)	133 / 608	▼10	Opposition
Nov 1932	7,247,901	20.4 (#2)	121 / 584	▼12	Opposition
Mar 1933	7,181,629	18.3 (#2)	120 / 667	▼1	Opposition
Nov 1933	Banned. The Nazi Party was the sole legal party.				
1936	Banned. The Nazi Party was the sole legal party.				
1938	Banned. The Nazi Party was the sole legal party.				

=== Federal parliament (Bundestag) ===
Election	Candidate	Constituency		Party list		Seats	+/–	Status
Election	Candidate	Votes	%	Votes	%	Seats	+/–	Status
1949	Kurt Schumacher			6,934,975	29.2 (#2)	131 / 402		Opposition
1953	Erich Ollenhauer	8,131,257	29.5 (#2)	7,944,943	28.8 (#2)	162 / 509	▲22	Opposition
1957	Erich Ollenhauer	11,975,400	32.0 (#2)	9,495,571	31.8 (#2)	181 / 519	▲19	Opposition
1961	Willy Brandt	11,672,057	36.5 (#1)	11,427,355	36.2 (#1)	203 / 521	▲22	Opposition
1965	Willy Brandt	12,998,474	40.1 (#1)	12,813,186	39.3 (#1)	217 / 518	▲14	Opposition (1965–1966)
1965	Willy Brandt	12,998,474	40.1 (#1)	12,813,186	39.3 (#1)	217 / 518	▲14	CDU/CSU–SPD (1966–1969)
1969	Willy Brandt	14,402,374	44.0 (#1)	14,065,716	42.7 (#1)	237 / 518	▲20	SPD–FDP
1972	Willy Brandt	18,228,239	48.9 (#1)	17,175,169	45.8 (#1)	242 / 518	▲5	SPD–FDP
1976	Helmut Schmidt	16,471,321	43.7 (#1)	16,099,019	42.6 (#1)	224 / 518	▼18	SPD–FDP
1980	Helmut Schmidt	16,808,861	44.5 (#1)	16,260,677	42.9 (#1)	228 / 519	▲4	SPD–FDP (1980–1982)
1980	Helmut Schmidt	16,808,861	44.5 (#1)	16,260,677	42.9 (#1)	228 / 519	▲4	Opposition (1982–1983)
1983	Hans-Jochen Vogel	15,686,033	40.4 (#2)	14,865,807	38.2 (#1)	202 / 520	▼26	Opposition
1987	Johannes Rau	14,787,953	39.2 (#1)	14,025,763	37.0 (#1)	193 / 519	▼9	Opposition
1990	Oskar Lafontaine	16,279,980	35.2 (#2)	15,545,366	33.5 (#2)	239 / 662	▲46	Opposition
1994	Rudolf Scharping	17,966,813	38.3 (#1)	17,140,354	36.4 (#1)	252 / 672	▲13	Opposition
1998	Gerhard Schröder	21,535,893	43.8 (#1)	20,181,269	40.9 (#1)	298 / 669	▲43	SPD–Greens
2002	Gerhard Schröder	20,059,967	41.9 (#1)	18,484,560	38.5 (#1)	251 / 603	▼47	SPD–Greens
2005	Gerhard Schröder	18,129,100	38.4 (#1)	16,194,665	34.2 (#1)	222 / 614	▼29	CDU/CSU–SPD
2009	Frank-Walter Steinmeier	12,077,437	27.9 (#2)	9,988,843	23.0 (#2)	146 / 622	▼76	Opposition
2013	Peer Steinbrück	12,835,933	29.4 (#2)	11,247,283	25.7 (#2)	193 / 630	▲42	CDU/CSU–SPD
2017	Martin Schulz	11,426,613	24.6 (#2)	9,538,367	20.5 (#2)	153 / 709	▼40	CDU/CSU–SPD
2021	Olaf Scholz	12,227,998	26.4 (#1)	11,949,374	25.7 (#1)	206 / 736	**▲53**	SPD–Greens–FDP (2021–2024)
2021	Olaf Scholz	12,227,998	26.4 (#1)	11,949,374	25.7 (#1)	206 / 736	**▲53**	SPD–Greens (2024–2025)
2025	Olaf Scholz	9,934,614	20.1 (#3)	8,148,284	16.4 (#3)	120 / 630	▼86	CDU/CSU–SPD

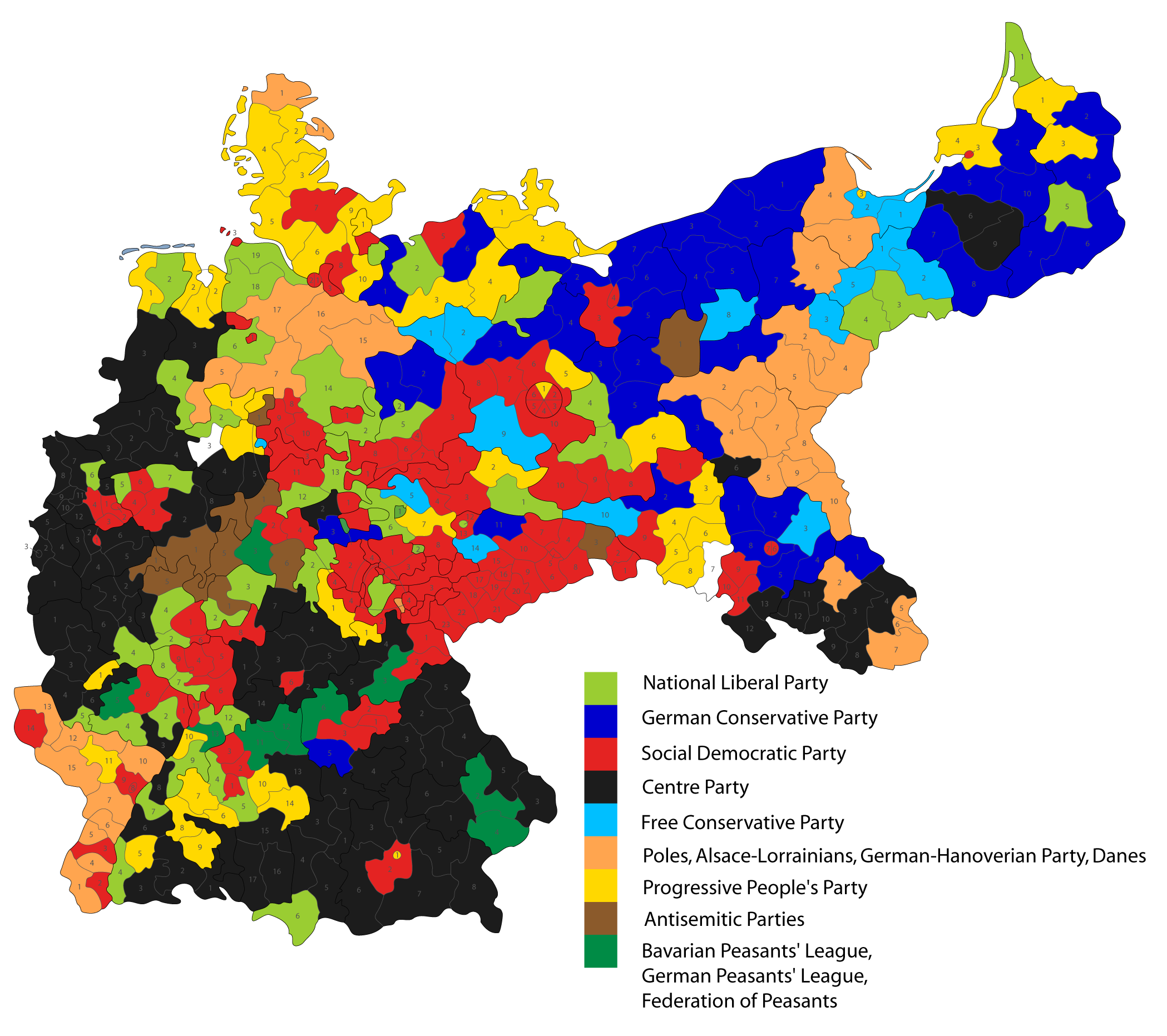
Constituency results, 1912

Constituency results, 1919

Constituency results, 1928

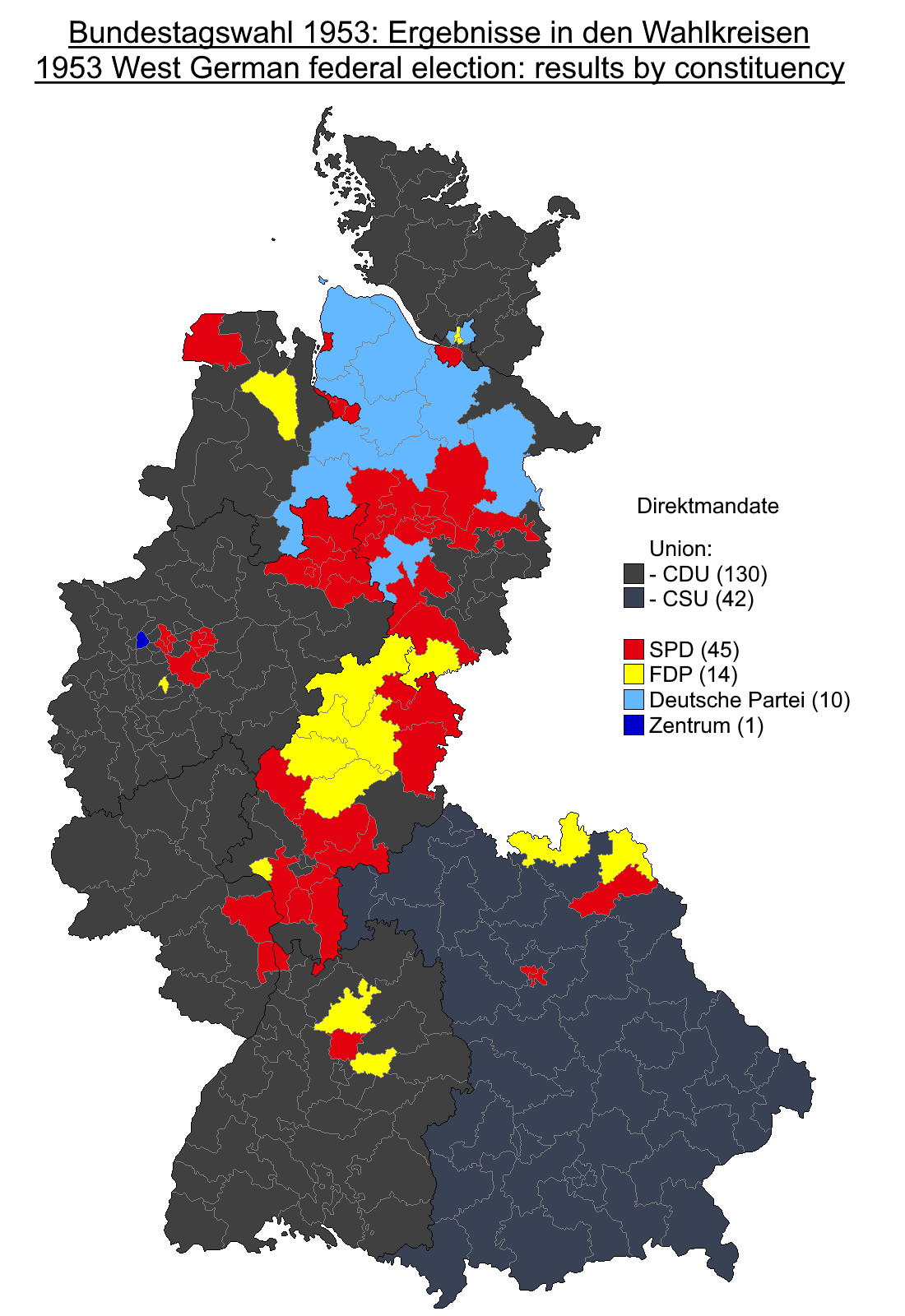
Constituency results, 1953

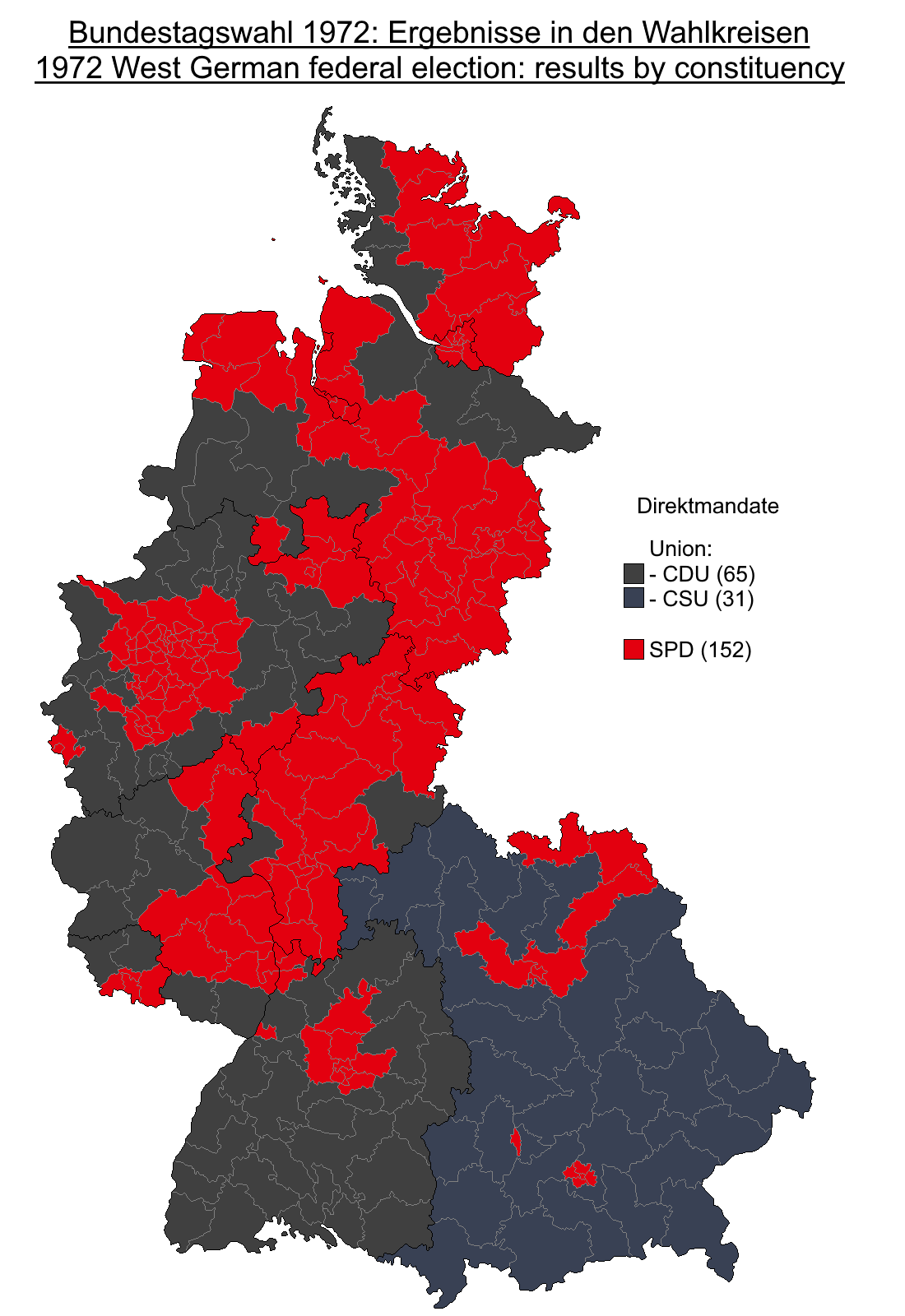
Constituency results, 1972

Constituency results, 1990

Constituency results, 1998

Constituency results, 2021

Constituency results, 2025

=== European Parliament ===
Election	Votes	%	Seats	+/–	EP Group
1979	11,370,045	40.83 (#1)	33 / 81	New	SOC
1984	9,296,417	37.41 (#2)	32 / 81	▼1	SOC
1989	10,525,728	37.32 (#1)	30 / 81	▼2	SOC
1994	11,389,697	32.16 (#1)	40 / 99	▲10	PES
1999	8,307,085	30.70 (#2)	33 / 99	▼7	PES
2004	5,547,971	21.52 (#2)	23 / 99	▼10	PES
2009	5,472,566	20.78 (#2)	23 / 99	0	S&D
2014	7,999,955	27.26 (#2)	27 / 96	▲4	S&D
2019	5,914,953	15.82 (#3)	16 / 96	▼11	S&D
2024	5,548,528	13.94 (#3)	14 / 96	▼2	S&D

=== State parliaments (Länder) ===
State	Election	Votes	%	Seats	+/–	Status
Baden-Württemberg	2026	298,247	5.5 (#4)	10 / 158	▼9	Opposition
Bavaria	2023	1,140,585	8.4 (#5)	17 / 203	▼5	Opposition
Berlin	2026	220,939	12.1 (#5)	22 / 158	▼12	TBD
Brandenburg	2024	463,678	30.89 (#1)	32 / 88	▲7	SPD–BSW (2024–2026)
Brandenburg	2024	463,678	30.89 (#1)	32 / 88	▲7	SPD–CDU (2026–present)
Bremen	2023	376,610	29.8 (#1)	27 / 84	▲4	SPD–Greens–Left
Hamburg	2025	1,463,560	33.5 (#1)	45 / 121	▼9	SPD–Greens
Hesse	2023	424,487	15.1 (#3)	23 / 133	▼6	CDU–SPD
Lower Saxony	2022	1,211,418	33.4 (#1)	57 / 146	▲2	SPD–Greens
Mecklenburg-Vorpommern	2026	360,393	35.50 (#2)	29 / 79	▼5	SPD–Left
North Rhine-Westphalia	2022	1,905,002	26.7 (#2)	56 / 195	▼13	Opposition
Rhineland-Palatinate	2026	525,680	25.9 (#2)	32 / 101	▼7	CDU–SPD
Saarland	2022	196,799	43.5 (#1)	29 / 51	▲12	SPD majority
Saxony	2024	172,002	7.3 (#4)	10 / 119	0	CDU–SPD
Saxony-Anhalt	2026	122,303	9.3 (#3)	8 / 83	▼1	TBD
Schleswig-Holstein	2022	221,536	16.0 (#3)	12 / 69	▼9	Opposition
Thuringia	2024	73,088	6.1 (#5)	6 / 90	▼2	CDU–SPD–BSW (2024–26)
Thuringia	2024	73,088	6.1 (#5)	6 / 90	▼2	CDU–T.G–SPD (since 2026)

Best historic results for state parties
State	Seats / Total	%	Position/Gov.	Year	Lead Candidate
Baden-Württemberg	46 / 146	29.4 (#2)	CDU–SPD	1992	Dieter Spöri (Deputy Minister-President 1992–1996)
Bavaria	61 / 204	28.1 (#2)	SPD–BP–GB/BHE–FDP	1954	Wilhelm Hoegner (Minister-President 1954–1957)
Berlin	89 / 140	61.9 (#1)	SPD–FDP	1963	Willy Brandt (Governing Mayor 1957–1966)
Brandenburg	52 / 88	54.1 (#1)	SPD majority	1994	Manfred Stolpe (Minister-President 1990–2002)
Bremen	59 / 100	55.3 (#1)	SPD majority	1971	Hans Koschnick (President of the Senate and Mayor 1967–1985)
Hamburg	74 / 120	59.0 (#1)	SPD majority	1966	Herbert Weichmann (First Mayor 1965–1971)
Hesse	52 / 96	51.0 (#1)	SPD majority	1966	Georg-August Zinn (Minister-President 1950–1969)
Lower Saxony	83 / 157	47.9 (#1)	SPD majority	1998	Gerhard Schröder (Minister-President 1990–1998)
Mecklenburg-Vorpommern	34 / 79	39.6 (#1)	SPD–Left	2021	Manuela Schwesig (Minister-President 2017–)
North Rhine-Westphalia	125 / 227	52.1 (#1)	SPD majority	1985	Johannes Rau (Minister-President 1978–1998)
Rhineland-Palatinate	53 / 101	45.6 (#1)	SPD majority	2006	Kurt Beck (Minister-President 1994–2013)
Saarland	30 / 51	54.4 (#1)	SPD majority	1990	Oskar Lafontaine (Minister-President 1985–1998)
Saxony	18 / 126	12.4 (#3)	CDU–SPD	2014	Martin Dulig (Deputy Minister-President 2014–2019)
Saxony-Anhalt	47 / 116	35.9 (#1)	SPD minority with PDS confidence and supply	1998	Reinhard Höppner (Minister-President 1994–2002)
Schleswig-Holstein	46 / 74	54.7 (#1)	SPD majority	1988	Björn Engholm (Minister-President 1988–1993)
Thuringia	29 / 88	29.6 (#2)	CDU–SPD	1994	Gerd Schuchardt (Deputy Minister-President 1994–1999)

=== Results timeline ===
Year	(Germany) DE		(European Union) EU	(Baden-Württemberg) BW			(Bavaria) BY	(Berlin) BE	(Brandenburg) BB	(Bremen (state)) HB	(Hamburg) HH	(Hesse) HE	(Lower Saxony) NI	(Mecklenburg-Vorpommern) MV	(North Rhine-Westphalia) NW	(Rhineland-Palatinate) RP	(Saarland) SL	(Saxony) SN	(Saxony-Anhalt) ST	(Schleswig-Holstein) SH	(Thuringia) TH
Year	(West Germany) WD	(East Germany) DD	(European Union) EU	(Grand Duchy of Baden) SB	WB	(Württemberg-Hohenzollern) WH	(Bavaria) BY	(Berlin) BE	(Brandenburg) BB	(Bremen (state)) HB	(Hamburg) HH	(Hesse) HE	(Lower Saxony) NI	(Mecklenburg-Vorpommern) MV	(North Rhine-Westphalia) NW	(Rhineland-Palatinate) RP	(Saarland) SL	(Saxony) SN	(Saxony-Anhalt) ST	(Schleswig-Holstein) SH	(Thuringia) TH
1946	N/A	N/A	N/A		31.9		28.6	48.7	(Note: The eastern sections of the SPD were forcibly merged into the SED prior to the 1946 elections in the eastern zone.)	47.6	43.1	42.7									
1947	N/A	N/A	N/A	22.4		20.8		48.7	(Note: The eastern sections of the SPD were forcibly merged into the SED prior to the 1946 elections in the eastern zone.)	▼41.7			43.4		32.0	34.3	32.8			43.8	
1948	N/A	N/A	N/A					▲**64.5**	(Note: The eastern sections of the SPD were forcibly merged into the SED prior to the 1946 elections in the eastern zone.)												
1949	29.2	(Note: All East German Volkskammer elections bar that of 1990, as well as the 1950 East German state elections, were held on a non-competitive basis. Citizens could only vote for or against the "unity list" of the National Front of the GDR, which comprised the ruling SED and its subordinate bloc parties; SPD sections in East Germany have been forcibly merged into the SED, with the brief exception of the East Berlin-based Eastern Bureau of the SPD, which was a bloc party in the 1949 East German Constitutional Assembly election and 1950 Volkskammer election.)	N/A					▲**64.5**	(Note: The eastern sections of the SPD were forcibly merged into the SED prior to the 1946 elections in the eastern zone.)		▼42.8										
1950	29.2		N/A		▲33.0		▼28.0	▼44.7				▲44.4			▲32.3					▼27.5	
1951	29.2		N/A		▲33.0		▼28.0			▼39.1			▼33.7		▲32.3	▼34.0				▼27.5	
1952	29.2		N/A	28.0			▼28.0		N/A					N/A	▲32.3	▼34.0	▼32.4	N/A	N/A	▼27.5	N/A
1953	▼28.8		N/A				▼28.0		N/A		▲45.2			N/A	▲32.3	▼34.0	▼32.4	N/A	N/A	▼27.5	N/A
1954	▼28.8		N/A				▲28.1	▼44.6	N/A		▲45.2	▼42.6		N/A	▲34.5	▼34.0		N/A	N/A	▲33.2	N/A
1955	▼28.8		N/A						N/A	▲47.8	▲45.2		▲35.2	N/A	▲34.5	▼31.7	▼20.1	N/A	N/A	▲33.2	N/A
1956	▼28.8		N/A	▲28.9					N/A		▲45.2		▲35.2	N/A		▼31.7		N/A	N/A	▲33.2	N/A
1957	▲31.8		N/A						N/A		▲53.9			N/A		▼31.7		N/A	N/A	▲33.2	N/A
1958	▲31.8		N/A				▲30.8	▲52.6	N/A			▲46.9		N/A	▲39.2	▼31.7		N/A	N/A	▲35.9	N/A
1959	▲31.8		N/A				▲30.8		N/A	▲54.9			▲39.5	N/A	▲39.2	▲34.9		N/A	N/A	▲35.9	N/A
1960	▲31.8		N/A	▲35.3			▲30.8		N/A					N/A	▲39.2	▲34.9	▲30.0	N/A	N/A	▲35.9	N/A
1961	▲36.2		N/A	▲35.3			▲30.8		N/A		▲57.4			N/A	▲39.2	▲34.9	▲30.0	N/A	N/A	▲35.9	N/A
1962	▲36.2		N/A	▲35.3			▲35.3		N/A			▲50.8		N/A	▲43.3	▲34.9	▲30.0	N/A	N/A	▲39.2	N/A
1963	▲36.2		N/A	▲35.3			▲35.3	▲61.9	N/A	▼54.7			▲44.9	N/A	▲43.3	▲40.7	▲30.0	N/A	N/A	▲39.2	N/A
1964	▲36.2		N/A	▲37.3			▲35.3		N/A					N/A	▲43.3	▲40.7	▲30.0	N/A	N/A	▲39.2	N/A
1965	▲39.3		N/A	▲37.3			▲35.3		N/A					N/A	▲43.3	▲40.7	▲40.7	N/A	N/A	▲39.2	N/A
1966			N/A				▲**35.8**		N/A		▲**59.0**	▲**51.0**		N/A	▲49.5	▲40.7	▲40.7	N/A	N/A	▲39.2	N/A
1967			N/A				▲**35.8**	▼56.9	N/A	▼46.0			▼43.1	N/A		▼36.8	▲40.7	N/A	N/A	▲39.4	N/A
1968			N/A	▼29.0			▲**35.8**		N/A					N/A		▼36.8	▲40.7	N/A	N/A	▲39.4	N/A
1969	▲42.7		N/A				▲**35.8**		N/A					N/A		▼36.8	▲40.7	N/A	N/A	▲39.4	N/A
1970			N/A				▼33.3		N/A		▼55.3	▼45.9	▲46.3	N/A	▼46.1	▼36.8	▲40.8	N/A	N/A	▲39.4	N/A
1971			N/A				▼33.3	▼50.4	N/A	▲**55.3**				N/A		▲40.5	▲40.8	N/A	N/A	▲41.0	N/A
1972	▲**45.8**		N/A	▲**37.6**			▼33.3		N/A					N/A		▲40.5	▲40.8	N/A	N/A	▲41.0	N/A
1973			N/A	▲**37.6**			▼33.3		N/A					N/A		▲40.5	▲40.8	N/A	N/A	▲41.0	N/A
1974			N/A	▲**37.6**			▼30.2		N/A		▼45.0	▼43.2	▼43.1	N/A		▲40.5	▲40.8	N/A	N/A	▲41.0	N/A
1975			N/A	▲**37.6**			▼30.2	▼42.6	N/A	▼48.8			▼43.1	N/A	▼45.1	▼38.5	▲41.8	N/A	N/A	▼40.1	N/A
1976	▼42.6		N/A	▼33.3			▼30.2		N/A					N/A		▼38.5	▲41.8	N/A	N/A	▼40.1	N/A
1977			N/A	▼33.3			▼30.2		N/A					N/A		▼38.5	▲41.8	N/A	N/A	▼40.1	N/A
1978			N/A	▼33.3			▲31.4		N/A		▲51.5	▲44.3	▼42.2	N/A		▼38.5	▲41.8	N/A	N/A	▼40.1	N/A
1979			**40.8**	▼33.3			▲31.4	▲42.7	N/A	▲49.4			▼42.2	N/A		▲42.3	▲41.8	N/A	N/A	▲41.7	N/A
1980	▲42.9		**40.8**	▼32.5			▲31.4	▲42.7	N/A				▼42.2	N/A	▲48.4	▲42.3	▲45.4	N/A	N/A	▲41.7	N/A
1981			**40.8**	▼32.5			▲31.4	▼38.3	N/A				▼42.2	N/A		▲42.3	▲45.4	N/A	N/A	▲41.7	N/A
1982			**40.8**	▼32.5			▲31.9	▼38.3	N/A		▼42.7	▼42.8	▼36.5	N/A		▲42.3	▲45.4	N/A	N/A	▲41.7	N/A
1982			**40.8**	▼32.5			▲31.9	▼38.3	N/A		▲51.3	▼42.8	▼36.5	N/A		▲42.3	▲45.4	N/A	N/A	▲41.7	N/A
1983	▼38.2		**40.8**	▼32.5			▲31.9	▼38.3	N/A	▲51.3		▲46.2	▼36.5	N/A		▼39.6	▲45.4	N/A	N/A	▲43.7	N/A
1984	▼38.2		▼37.4	▼32.4			▲31.9	▼38.3	N/A				▼36.5	N/A		▼39.6	▲45.4	N/A	N/A	▲43.7	N/A
1985	▼38.2		▼37.4	▼32.4			▲31.9	▼32.4	N/A				▼36.5	N/A	▲**52.1**	▼39.6	▲49.2	N/A	N/A	▲43.7	N/A
1986	▼38.2		▼37.4	▼32.4			▼27.5	▼32.4	N/A		▼41.7		▲42.1	N/A		▼39.6		N/A	N/A	▲43.7	N/A
1987	▼37.0		▼37.4	▼32.4			▼27.5	▼32.4	N/A	▼50.5	▲45.0	▼40.2	▲42.1	N/A		▼38.8		N/A	N/A	▲45.2	N/A
1988	▼37.0		▼37.4	▼32.0			▼27.5	▼32.4	N/A			▼40.2	▲42.1	N/A		▼38.8		N/A	N/A	▲**54.8**	N/A
1989	▼37.0		▼37.3	▼32.0			▼27.5	▲37.3	N/A			▼40.2	▲42.1	N/A		▼38.8		N/A	N/A		N/A
1990	▼33.5	21.9 (Note: Results for the Social Democratic Party in the GDR)	▼37.3	▼32.0			▼26.0	▼30.4	38.2			▼40.2	▲44.2	27.0	▼50.0	▼38.8	▲**54.4**	19.1	26.0		22.8
1991			▼37.3	▼32.0			▼26.0			▼38.8	▲48.0	▲40.8		27.0		▲44.8		19.1	26.0		22.8
1992			▼37.3	▼29.4			▼26.0				▲48.0			27.0				19.1	26.0	▼46.2	22.8
1993			▼37.3				▼26.0				▼40.4			27.0				19.1	26.0		22.8
1994	▲36.4		▼32.2				▲30.0		▲**54.1**				▲44.3	▲29.5			▼49.4	▼16.6	▲34.0		▲**29.6**
1995	▲36.4		▼32.2				▲30.0	▼23.6		▼33.4		▼38.0			▼46.0			▼16.6			
1996	▲36.4		▼32.2	▼25.1			▲30.0									▼39.8		▼16.6		▼39.8	
1997	▲36.4		▼32.2	▼25.1			▲30.0				▼36.2							▼16.6			
1998	▲40.9		▼32.2	▼25.1			▼28.7						▲**47.9**	▲34.3				▼16.6	▲**35.9**		
1999			▼30.7	▼25.1			▼28.7	▼22.4	▼39.3	▲42.6		▼39.4					▼44.4	▼10.7			▼18.5
2000			▼30.7	▼25.1			▼28.7	▼22.4				▼39.4			▼42.8		▼44.4	▼10.7		▲43.1	▼18.5
2001			▼30.7	▲33.3			▼28.7				▲36.5	▼39.4				▲44.8	▼44.4	▼10.7			▼18.5
2001			▼30.7	▲33.3			▼28.7	▲29.7			▲36.5	▼39.4				▲44.8	▼44.4	▼10.7			▼18.5
2002	▼38.5		▼30.7	▲33.3			▼28.7				▲36.5	▼39.4		▲**40.6**			▼44.4	▼10.7	▼20.0		▼18.5
2003			▼30.7	▲33.3			▼19.6			▼42.3	▲36.5	▼29.1	▼33.4				▼44.4	▼10.7	▼20.0		▼18.5
2004			▼21.5	▲33.3			▼19.6		▼31.9		▼30.5	▼29.1	▼33.4				▼30.8	▼9.8	▼20.0		▼14.5
2005	▼34.2		▼21.5	▲33.3			▼19.6				▼30.5	▼29.1	▼33.4		▼37.1		▼30.8		▼20.0	▼38.7	▼14.5
2006			▼21.5	▼25.2			▼19.6	▲30.8			▼30.5	▼29.1	▼33.4	▼30.2	▼37.1	▲**45.6**	▼30.8		▲21.4		▼14.5
2007			▼21.5	▼25.2			▼19.6			▼36.7	▼30.5	▼29.1	▼33.4		▼37.1		▼30.8				▼14.5
2008			▼21.5	▼25.2			▼18.6				▲34.1	▲36.7	▼30.3		▼37.1		▼30.8				▼14.5
2009	▼23.0		▼20.8	▼25.2			▼18.6		▲33.0		▲34.1	▼23.7	▼30.3		▼37.1		▼24.5	▲10.4		▼25.4	▲18.5
2010	▼23.0		▼20.8	▼25.2			▼18.6				▲34.1	▼23.7	▼30.3		▼34.5		▼24.5	▲10.4		▼25.4	
2011	▼23.0		▼20.8	▼23.1			▼18.6	▼28.3		▲38.6	▲48.4	▼23.7	▼30.3	▲35.6	▼34.5	▼35.7	▼24.5	▲10.4	▲21.5	▼25.4	
2012	▼23.0		▼20.8				▼18.6					▼23.7	▼30.3		▲39.1		▲30.6	▲10.4		▲30.4	
2013	▲25.7		▼20.8				▲20.6					▲30.7	▲32.6					▲10.4			
2014			▲27.3				▲20.6		▼31.9			▲30.7						▲12.4			▼12.4
2015			▲27.3				▲20.6			▼32.8	▼45.6	▲30.7									
2016			▲27.3	▼12.7			▲20.6	▼21.6				▲30.7		▼30.6		▲36.2			▼10.6		
2017	▼20.5		▲27.3	▼12.7			▲20.6					▲30.7	▲36.9		▼31.2		▼29.6			▼27.3	
2018			▲27.3	▼12.7			▼9.7					▼19.8			▼31.2					▼27.3	
2019			▼15.8	▼12.7			▼9.7		▼26.2	▼24.9		▼19.8			▼31.2			▼7.7		▼27.3	▼8.2
2020			▼15.8	▼12.7			▼9.7				▼39.2	▼19.8			▼31.2					▼27.3	
2021	▲25.7		▼15.8	▼11.0			▼9.7	▼21.4				▼19.8		▲39.6	▼31.2	▼35.7			▼8.4	▼27.3	
2022			▼15.8	▼11.0			▼9.7	▼21.4				▼19.8	▼33.4		▼26.7		▲43.5			▼16.0	
2023			▼15.8	▼11.0			▼8.4	▼18.4		▲29.8		▼15.1			▼26.7					▼16.0	
2024			▼13.9	▼11.0			▼8.4		▲30.9						▼26.7			▼7.3		▼16.0	▼6.1
2025	▼16.4		▼13.9	▼11.0			▼8.4				▼33.5				▼26.7					▼16.0	
2026	▼16.4		▼13.9	▼5.5			▼8.4	▼12.1			▼33.5			▼35.5	▼26.7	▼25.9			▲9.3	▼16.0	
Year	(Germany) DE		(European Union) EU	(Baden-Württemberg) BW			(Bavaria) BY	(Berlin) BE	(Brandenburg) BB	(Bremen (state)) HB	(Hamburg) HH	(Hesse) HE	(Lower Saxony) NI	(Mecklenburg-Vorpommern) MV	(North Rhine-Westphalia) NW	(Rhineland-Palatinate) RP	(Saarland) SL	(Saxony) SN	(Saxony-Anhalt) ST	(Schleswig-Holstein) SH	(Thuringia) TH
**Bold** indicates best result to date. Present in legislature (in opposition); Junior coalition partner Senior coalition partner or majority government

== See also ==
- Elections in the Free State of Prussia
- Iron Front
- List of political parties in Germany
- Mierscheid Law
- Party finance in Germany
- People's party (Volkspartei)
- Politics of Germany
